= Séminaire Nicolas Bourbaki (1950–1959) =

Continuation of the Séminaire Nicolas Bourbaki programme, for the 1950s.

== 1950/51 series ==
33. Armand Borel, Sous-groupes compacts maximaux des groupes de Lie, d'après Cartan, Iwasawa et Mostow (maximal compact subgroups)
34. Henri Cartan, Espaces fibrés analytiques complexes (analytic geometry, fiber bundles)
35. Charles Ehresmann, Sur les variétés presque complexes (almost-complex manifolds)
36. Samuel Eilenberg, Exposition des théories de Morse et Lusternick–Schnirelmann (Morse theory, Lusternik–Schnirelmann category)
37. Luc Gauthier, Quelques variétés usuelles en géométrie algébrique (algebraic geometry)
38. Jean-Louis Koszul, Cohomologie des espaces fibrés différentiables et connexions (Chern–Weil theory)
39. Jean Delsarte, Nombre de solutions des équations polynomiales sur un corps fini, d'après A. Weil (Weil conjectures)
40. Jacques Dixmier, Anneaux d'opérateurs et représentations des groupes (operator algebras, representation theory)
41. Roger Godement, Théorie des caractères dans les groupes unimodulaires (unimodular groups)
42. Pierre Samuel, Théorie du corps de classes local selon G. P. Hochschild (local class field theory)
43. Laurent Schwartz, Les théorèmes de Whitney sur les fonctions différentiables (singularity theory)
44. Jean-Pierre Serre, Groupes d'homotopie (homotopy groups)
45. Armand Borel, Cohomologie des espaces homogènes (cohomology of homogeneous spaces of Lie groups)
46. Samuel Eilenberg, Foncteurs de modules et leurs satellites, d'après Cartan et Eilenberg (homological algebra)
47. Marc Krasner, Généralisations non-abéliennes de la théorie locale des corps de classes (local fields)
48. Jean Leray, La résolution des problèmes de Cauchy et de Dirichlet au moyen du calcul symbolique et des projections orthogonales et obliques (Dirichlet problems and Cauchy problems for partial differential equations, symbolic calculus)
49. Pierre Samuel, Sections hyperplanes des variétés normales, d'après A. Seidenberg (algebraic geometry, hyperplane sections, normal variety)

== 1951/52 ==
50. Jacques Dixmier, Quelques résultats d'Harish-Chandra, I (representation theory of semisimple groups)
51. Roger Godement, Les travaux de Hecke, I (modular forms)
52. Jacques-Louis Lions, Les travaux de Deny en théorie du potentiel (potential theory)
53. Pierre Samuel, Variété de Picard et groupe de Severi, d'après A. Néron (Picard variety and Néron-Severi group)
54. Jean-Pierre Serre, Utilisation des nouvelles opérations de Steenrod dans la théorie des espaces fibrés, d'après Borel et Serre (Steenrod operations)
55. Dov Tamari, Machines logiques et problèmes de mots. I : Les machines de Turing (theory of computation)
56. Jean Braconnier, Sous-algèbres sous-invariantes d'une algèbre de Lie et tour des dérivations, d'après E. Schenkman (Lie algebras)
57. Jean Dieudonné, Groupes de Lie algébriques (Travaux de Chevalley) (algebraic groups and their Lie algebras)
58. Jacques Dixmier, Quelques résultats d'Harish-Chandra, II (see 50)
59. Roger Godement, Les travaux de Hecke, II (see 51)
60. André Lichnerowicz, Variétés localement kählériennes (local Kähler manifolds)
61. Dov Tamari, Machines logiques et problèmes de mots. II : Problèmes de mots indécidables (see 55)
62. Armand Borel, Les espaces hermitiens symétriques (hermitian symmetric spaces)
63. Pierre Dolbeault, Le théorème de Riemann-Roch sur les surfaces kählériennes compactes, d'après K. Kodaira (Riemann-Roch theorem for Kähler surfaces)
64. Nathan Jacobson, Le problème de Kuroš (Kurosh problem)
65. Bernard Malgrange, Equations de Sturm–Liouville (Sturm–Liouville equations)
66. André Néron, L'arithmétique sur les variétés algébriques, d'après A. Weil (diophantine geometry)
67. Laurent Schwartz, Les travaux de L. Gårding sur les équations aux dérivées partielles elliptiques (partial differential equations)

== 1952/53 ==
68. François Bruhat, Représentations induites des groupes localement compacts (induced representations of locally compact groups)
69. Alexander Grothendieck, Produits tensoriels topologiques et espaces nucléaires (Topological tensor products and nuclear spaces)
70. Paul Jaffard, Les corps quasi-algébriquement clos, d'après S. Lang (quasi-algebraic closure)
71. Jean-Pierre Serre, Cohomologie et fonctions de variables complexes (sheaf cohomology, several complex variables)
72. André Weil, Variété de Picard et variétés jacobiennes (Picard variety and Jacobian variety)
73. Henri Cartan, Mémoire de Gleason sur le cinquième problème de Hilbert (Hilbert's fifth problem)
74. Roger Godement, Travaux de Hecke, III (see 51)
75. Jean-Louis Koszul, Relations d'équivalence sur les courbes algébriques ayant des points multiples, d'après M. Rosenlicht (generalized Jacobians)
76. Michel Lazard, Groupes analytiques en caractéristique 0 (formal groups)
77. Jean-Pierre Serre, Cohomologie et arithmétique (diophantine geometry?)
78. René Thom, Sous-variétés et classes d'homologie des variétés différentiables (homology theory of smooth manifolds)
79. Jacques Dixmier, Fonctions sphériques, d'après R. Godement (spherical functions)
80. Roger Godement, Travaux de Hecke, IV (see 51)
81. Robert Lattès, Application de la théorie des semi-groupes à l'intégration d'équations aux dérivées partielles (semigroup and partial differential equations)
82. Jean-Pierre Serre, Espaces fibrés algébriques, d'après A. Weil (fiber bundles, algebraic geometry)
83. André Weil, Sur la théorie du corps de classes (class field theory)

== 1953/54 ==
84. Henri Cartan, Fonctions et variétés algebroïdes, d'après F. Hirzebruch (algebroid functions, algebroid varieties)
85. Robert Pallu de la Barrière, L'existence de sous-espaces stables, d'après J. Werner (invariant subspaces)
86. Pierre Samuel, Les fonctions holomorphes abstraites de Zariski (abstract holomorphic functions)
87. Laurent Schwartz, Solution élémentaire d'une équation aux dérivées partielles à coefficients constants d'après B. Malgrange (fundamental solutions)
88. Jean-Pierre Serre, Travaux d'Hirzebruch sur la topologie des variétés (topology of algebraic varieties)
89. René Thom, Sur les variétés-bords (cobordism)
90. Roger Godement, Cohomologie des groupes discontinus (group cohomology of discrete groups)
91. Alexander Grothendieck, La théorie de Fredholm (Fredholm theory)
92. Jean-Claude Herz, Caractérisation des caractères des groupes finis, d'après R. Brauer (character theory of finite groups)
93. Jean-Louis Koszul, Les variétés jacobiennes généralisées, d'après M. Rosenlicht (generalized Jacobians)
94. André Néron, Le lemme d'Enriques-Severi, d'après O. Zariski (algebraic geometry, Enriques-Severi lemma)
95. Jean-Pierre Serre, Faisceaux analytiques (coherent analytic sheaf)
96. Pierre Cartier, Représentations des groupes de Lie, d'après Harisch-Chandra (representation theory of Lie groups)
97. Bernard Malgrange, Fonctions moyenne-périodiques, d'après J.-P. Kahane (mean-periodic functions)
98. Katsumi Nomizu, Quelques résultats en géométrie différentielle des espaces homogènes (differential geometry of homogeneous spaces)
99. Pierre Samuel, Travaux de Zariski sur le 14° problème de M. Hilbert (Hilbert's fourteenth problem)
100. Jean-Pierre Serre, Représentations linéaires et espaces homogènes kählériens des groupes de Lie compacts, d'après Borel et Weil (Borel-Weil theorem)

== 1954/55 ==
101. Marcel Berger, Groupes d'holonomie des variétés à connexion affine (holonomy groups)
102. Pierre Cartier, Développements de fonctions arbitraires suivant les fonctions propres d'un opérateur différentiel (eigenfunction expansions)
103. Paul Jaffard, Anneaux d'adèles d'après Iwasawa (adele rings)
104. André Néron, Variétés abéliennes, d'après A. Weil (en introduction à l'exposé n° 106) (abelian varieties)
105. Jacques Riguet, Calcul différentiel libre, d'après Fox (free differential calculus, knot theory)
106. Pierre Samuel, La jacobienne d'une courbe algébrique, d'après W. L. Chow (Jacobian variety)
107. François Bruhat, Structure des algèbres de Lie semi-simples (Semisimple Lie algebras)
108. Jean-Louis Koszul, Formes hermitiennes canoniques des espaces homogènes complexes, d'après Atiyah (complex homogeneous spaces)
109. Michel Lazard, Lois de groupes et analyseurs (formal groups)
110. Jacques-Louis Lions, Problèmes aux limites relatifs à des équations de type elliptique (elliptic boundary value problems)
111. Jean-Pierre Serre, Le théorème de Brauer sur les caractères, d'après Brauer, Roquette et Tate (Brauer's theorem on induced characters)
112. Jacques Tits, Groupes semi-simples complexes et géométrie projective (complex semisimple groups and projective geometry)
113. Alexander Grothendieck, Réarrangements de fonctions et inégalités de convexité dans les algèbres de von Neumann munies d'une trace (function rearrangements and von Neumann algebras)
114. André Blanchard, Le plongement des variétés de Hodge dans des espaces projectifs complexes, d'après K. Kodaira (Hodge variety)
115. Henri Cartan, Sur un mémoire inédit de H. Grauert : "Zur Theorie der analytisch vollständigen Räume" (analytically complete spaces)
116. Pierre Cartier, Effacement dans la cohomologie des algèbres de Lie, d'après Hochschild et Koszul (Lie algebra cohomology)
117. Jacques-Louis Lions, Espaces de Beppo-Levi et quelques applications (Beppo-Levi spaces)
118. Yozo Matsushima, Pseudo-groupes de Lie transitifs (pseudogroups)
119. Jacques Tits, Sous-algèbres des algèbres de Lie semi-simples, d'après V. Morozov, A. Malcev, E. Dynkin et F. Karpelevic (semisimple Lie algebras)

== 1955/56 ==
120. Jean-Paul Benzécri, Théorie des capacités, d'après G. Choquet (analytic capacity in potential theory)
121. Armand Borel, Groupes algébriques (algebraic groups)
122. François Bruhat, Prolongement des sous-variétés analytiques, d'après W. Rothstein (analytic subvariety)
123. Jacques Dixmier, Travaux de Malgrange sur les équations aux dérivées partielles elliptiques (elliptic partial differential equations)
124. Paul Germain, Les équations du type mixte et le problème de Tricomi (Tricomi equation)
125. Henri Cartan, Théorie spectrale des C-algèbres commutatives d'après L. Waelbroeck (spectral theory, commutative C*-algebras)
126. Roger Godement, Représentations induites des groupes de Lie, d'après Bruhat (induced representations of Lie groups)
127. Paul Jaffard, Travaux de Krull sur les anneaux de Jacobson (Jacobson rings)
128. Dominique Ruyer, Extensions résolubles des corps de nombres algébriques, d'après Iwasawa (solvable extensions of number fields)
129. Pierre Samuel, Travaux de Shimura et Taniyama sur la multiplication complexe (complex multiplication)
130. François Trèves, Thèse d'Hörmander, I (partial differential equations)
131. Roger Godement, Représentations induites des groupes semi-simples (induced representations of semisimple groups)
132. Michel Hervé, Travaux de Köcher sur les formes modulaires (automorphic forms)
133. Jean-Pierre Serre, Théorie du corps de classes pour les revêtements non ramifiés de variétés algébriques, d'après S. Lang (class field theory for unramified coverings of algebraic varieties)
134. René Thom, Les singularités des applications différentiables (singularity theory)
135. François Trèves, Thèse d'Hörmander, II (see 130)
136. André Weil, Multiplication complexe des fonctions abéliennes (complex multiplication of abelian functions)

== 1956/57 ==
137. Henri Cartan, Espaces fibrés analytiques, d'après Grauert (complex manifolds)
138. Claude Chevalley, Le théorème fondamental de la multiplication complexe (Démonstration de Eichler) (complex multiplication)
139. Gustave Choquet, Existence et unicité des représentations intégrales au moyen des points extrémaux dans les cônes convexes (Choquet theory)
140. Jacques Dixmier, Travaux de Kadison sur les invariants unitaires (unitary invariants of operator algebras)
141. Alexander Grothendieck, Sur le mémoire de A. Weil : "Généralisation des fonctions abéliennes" (moduli of vector bundles)
142. Armand Borel, Travaux de Mostow sur les espaces homogènes (homogeneous spaces)
143. François Bruhat, Travaux de Harish-Chandra (representation theory)
144. Roger Godement, Introduction aux travaux de A. Selberg (automorphic forms)
145. Pierre Samuel, Travaux de Rosenlicht sur les groupes algébriques (algebraic groups)
146. Jean-Pierre Serre, Critère de rationalité pour les surfaces algébriques, d'après K. Kodaira (rational surfaces)
147. Gustave Choquet, Les travaux de Nash et Kuiper sur le plongement isométrique des variétés riemanniennes dans l'espace euclidien (embedding theorems)
148. Jacques Deny, Les deux aspects de la théorie du potentiel (potential theory)
149. Alexander Grothendieck, Théorèmes de dualité pour les faisceaux algébriques cohérents (coherent duality)
150. Bernard Malgrange, Variétés analytiques réelles, d'après F. Bruhat, H. Cartan et B. Malgrange (real analytic geometry)
151. André Weil, Sur le théorème de Torelli (Torelli theorem)

== 1957/58 ==
152. Claude Chevalley, La notion de correspondance propre en géométrie algébrique (proper morphisms)
153. Marcel Guillaume, Les tableaux sémantiques du calcul des prédicats restreint (semantic tableaux in predicate calculus)
154. Jean-Louis Koszul Fibrés vectoriels sur les courbes elliptiques, d'après Atiyah (vector bundles on elliptic curves)
155. Serge Lang, Familles algébriques de jacobiennes, d'après Igusa (Jacobian variety)
156. John Tate, WC-groups over p-adic fields (Weil-Châtelet groups for local fields)
157. René Thom, La classification des immersions, d'après Smale (immersions)
158. Claude Chevalley, La théorie des fonctions holomorphes de Zariski. Application au théorème de connexité (Zariski holomorphic functions, Zariski connectedness theorem)
159. Jean Dieudonné, Extensions de représentations linéaires de groupes de Lie, d'après Hochschild et Mostow (representation theory of Lie groups)
160. Harish-Chandra Some applications of invariant differential operators on a semisimple Lie algebra (invariant differential operators)
161. Laurent Schwartz, La fonction aléatoire du mouvement brownien (Brownian motion)
162. Jacques Tits, Les "formes réelles" des groupes de type E_{6} (real forms of E6)
163. Jean Braconnier, Sur les groupes de Lie compacts opérant dans une variété compacte, d'après G. Mostow (transformation groups)
164. Pierre Cartier, Dualité des variétés abéliennes (duality of abelian varieties)
165. A. Kolmogorov, Dimension linéaire des espaces vectoriels topologiques (linear dimension of topological vector spaces)
166. Bernard Malgrange, Théorème de Frobenius complexe (complex Frobenius theorem)
167. Goro Shimura, Fonctions automorphes et variétés abéliennes (automorphic functions and abelian varieties)
168. André Weil, Modules des surfaces de Riemann (moduli theory of Riemann surfaces)

== 1958/59 ==
169. Michel Demazure, Structure du groupe orthogonal, d'après T. Tamagawa (orthogonal group)
170. Albrecht Dold, Les foncteurs dérivés d'un foncteur non-additif (derived functors)
171. Roger Godement, Les fonctions zêta des algèbres simples, I (zeta-function of a simple algebra)
172. Michel A. Kervaire, L'homotopie stable des groupes classiques d'après R. Bott. Applications (Bott periodicity theorem)
173. François Norguet, Problème de Levi et plongement des variétés analytiques réelles, d'après H. Grauert (Levi problem, real analytic geometry)
174. Jean-Pierre Serre, Classes des corps cyclotomiques, d'après K. Iwasawa (Iwasawa theory)
175. Jacques Dixmier, Solution négative du problème des invariants, d'après Nagata (Hilbert's fourteenth problem)
176. Roger Godement, Les fonctions zêta des algèbres simples, II (see 171)
177. Friedrich Hirzebruch, A Riemann-Roch theorem for differentiable manifolds (Riemann–Roch theorem for smooth manifolds)
178. Bernard Malgrange, Unicité du problème de Cauchy, d'après A. P. Calderón (Cauchy problem)
179. Friedrich I. Mautner, Théorie des idéaux dans certaines algèbres d'un groupe (ring theory)
180. René Thom, Travaux de Milnor sur le cobordisme (cobordism theory)
181. Pierre Cartier, Vecteurs analytiques, d'après E. Nelson (analytic vectors for group representations)
182. Alexander Grothendieck, Géométrie formelle et géométrie algébrique (formal geometry and algebraic geometry)
183. Jean Leray, Résidus (residue calculus for several complex variables)
184. Jacques-Louis Lions, Equations de Navier–Stokes (Navier–Stokes equations)
185. Jean-Pierre Serre, Corps locaux et isogenies (isogeny)
186. André Weil, Adèles et groupes algébriques (adelic algebraic groups)

== 1959/60 ==
187. Jacques Deny, Formes et espaces de Dirichlet (Dirichlet forms, potential theory)
188. Albrecht Dold, Structure de l'anneau de cobordisme, d'après les travaux de V. A. Rokhlin et de C. T. C. Wall (cobordism theory)
189. Adrien Douady, Cohomologie des groupes compacts totalement discontinus, d'après Tate (group cohomology for profinite groups)
190. Alexander Grothendieck, Technique de descente et théorèmes d'existence en géométrie algébrique. I : Généralités. Descente par morphismes fidèlement plats (descent (category theory), faithfully flat morphisms)
191. Jean-Louis Koszul, Travaux de B. Kostant sur les groupes de Lie semi-simples (semisimple groups)
192. Georges Reeb Sur les feuilletages analytiques (analytic foliations)
193. Shiing-Shen Chern, Les hypersurfaces dans l'espace euclidien (hypersurfaces, differential geometry)
194. Jean Dieudonné, Les groupes simples déduits des algèbres de Lie simples complexes, d'après C. Chevalley (Chevalley groups)
195. Alexander Grothendieck, Technique de descente et théorèmes d'existence en géométrie algébrique. II : Le théorème d'existence en théorie formelle des modules (formal moduli)
196. Jacques-Louis Lions, Sur les théorèmes d'interpolation (interpolation theory)
197. Paul Malliavin, Calcul symbolique dans quelques algèbres de Banach (symbolic calculus in Banach algebras)
198. Jean-Pierre Serre, Rationalité des fonctions zêta des variétés algébriques, d'après Dwork (local zeta-functions)
199. Pierre Cartier, Structures simpliciales (simplicial sets)
200. Jean-Pierre Kahane, Séries de Fourier aléatoires (random Fourier series)
201. Serge Lang, Le théorème d'irréductibilité de Hilbert (Hilbert's irreducibility theorem)
202. Jean Leray, Le problème de Cauchy dans le cas analytique linéaire (Cauchy problem)
203. Bernard Malgrange, Division des distributions, d'après Lojasiewicz (division of distributions)
204. Jean-Pierre Serre, Revêtements ramifiés du plan projectif, d'après Abhyankar (branched coverings of the projective plane)
