= Séminaire Nicolas Bourbaki (1960–1969) =

Continuation of the Séminaire Nicolas Bourbaki programme, for the 1960s.

== 1960/61 series ==
205. Adrien Douady, Plongements de sphères, d'après Mazur et Brown (embeddings of spheres)
206. Roger Godement, Groupes linéaires algébriques sur un corps parfait (linear algebraic groups)
207. Alain Guichardet, Représentations des algèbres involutives (star-algebras)
208. Michel A. Kervaire, Le problème de Poincaré en dimensions élevées, d'après J. Stallings (Poincaré conjecture)
209. Jean-Pierre Serre, Groupes finis à cohomologie périodique, d'après R. Swan (group cohomology, periodic cohomology)
210. Jacques Tits, Les groupes simples de Suzuki et de Ree (Suzuki groups and Ree groups)
211. Pierre Cartier, Classes de formes bilinéaires sur les espaces de Banach, d'après Grothendieck (Grothendieck's inequality)
212. Alexander Grothendieck, Techniques de construction et théorèmes d'existence en géométrie algébrique. III : Préschémas quotients (Quot construction)
213. Bernard Malgrange, Equations différentielles sans solutions, d'après Lars Hörmander (partial differential equations)
214. André Martineau, Les hyperfonctions de M. Sato (hyperfunctions)
215. Arnold S. Shapiro, Algèbres de Clifford et périodicité des groupes, d'après R. Bott et A. Shapiro (Clifford algebras )
216. Jean-Louis Verdier, Sur les intégrales attachées aux formes automorphes, d'après Shimura (automorphic forms)
217. François Bruhat, Travaux de Sternberg (classical mechanics)
218. Pierre Cartier, Analyse spectrale et théorème de prédiction statistique de Wiener (spectral theory and prediction theory)
219. Claude Chevalley, Certains schémas de groupes semi-simples (group schemes of semisimple groups)
220. Adrien Douady, Le théorème de Grauert sur la cohérence des faisceaux-images d'un faisceau analytique cohérent par un morphisme propre (coherent cohomology and proper morphisms)
221. Alexander Grothendieck, Techniques de construction et théorèmes d'existence en géométrie algébrique. IV : Les schémas de Hilbert (Hilbert schemes)
222. Serge Lang, L'équivalence homotopique tangencielle, d'après Mazur (tangential homotopy equivalence)

== 1961/62 ==
223. Adrien Douady, Cycles analytiques, d'après Atiyah et Hirzebruch (analytic cycles)
224. cancelled
225. Jean-Pierre Kahane, Travaux de Beurling et Malliavin (harmonic analysis)
226. Bernard Morin, Un contre-example de Milnor à la Hauptvermutung (Hauptvermutung)
227. André Néron, Modèles p-minimaux des variétés abéliennes (Néron models)
228. Pierre Samuel, Invariants arithmétiques des courbes de genre 2, d'après Igusa (invariant theory)
229. François Bruhat, Intégration p-adique, d'après Tomas (p-adic integration)
230. Jean Cerf, Travaux de Smale sur la structure des variétés (smooth manifolds)
231. Pierre Eymard, Homomorphismes des algèbres de groupe, d'après Paul J. Cohen (Paul Cohen's theorem on harmonic analysis)
232. Alexander Grothendieck, Technique de descente et théorèmes d'existence en géométrie algébrique. V : Les schémas de Picard : Théorèmes d'existence (Picard schemes)
233. Bernard Morin, Champs de vecteurs sur les sphères, d'après J. P. Adams (vector fields on spheres)
234. François Norguet, Théorèmes de finitude pour la cohomologie des espaces complexes, d'après A. Andreotti et H. Grauert (finiteness theorems)
235. Michel Demazure, Sous-groupes arithmétiques des groupes algébriques linéaires, d'après Borel et Harish-Chandra (arithmetic groups)
236. Alexander Grothendieck, Technique de descente et théorèmes d'existence en géométrie algébrique. VI : Les schémas de Picard : Propriétés générales (see 232)
237. Serge Lang, Fonctions implicites et plongements riemanniens, d'après Nash et Moser (Nash embedding theorem, Nash–Moser theorem)
238. Laurent Schwartz, Sous-espaces hilbertiens et antinoyaux associés (Hilbert space)
239. André Weil, Un théorème fondamental de Chern en géométrie riemannienne (differential geometry)
240. Michel Zisman, Travaux de Borel-Haefliger-Moore (homology theory)

== 1962–63 ==
241. Pierre Cartier, Fluctuations dans les suites de variables aléatoires indépendantes (fluctuation theory for stochastic processes)
242. Yves Dejean, Transformation de Fourier des distributions homogènes, d'après Gårding (Fourier transform of homogeneous distributions)
243. Jean Dieudonné, Mémoire de Bertram Kostant sur les applications de la cohomologie des algèbres de Lie réductives (Lie algebra cohomology)
244. Roger Godement, La formule des traces de Selberg (Selberg trace formula)
245. André Haefliger, Plongements de variétés dans le domaine stable (embeddings of manifold)
246. Bernard Malgrange, Systèmes différentiels à coefficients constants (partial differential equations with constant coefficients)
247. François Bruhat, Points entiers sur les courbes de genre ≥ 1, d'après Lang (Diophantine equations)
248. Jean Giraud, Groupe de Picard, anneaux factoriels, d'après Grothendieck (Picard group, unique factorisation domains)
249. Alain Guichardet, Représentations des groupes de Lie nilpotents, d'après Kirillov (nilpotent Lie groups and representation theory, Kirillov orbit method)
250. Friedrich Hirzebruch, The topology of normal singularities of an algebraic surface (normal singularity, algebraic surfaces)
251. Jean-Louis Koszul, Théorèmes de points fixes pour les groupes élémentaires, d'après Borel (fixed-point theorems)
252. Jean-Pierre Serre, Structure de certains pro-p-groupes, d'après Demuškin (profinite groups)
253. Michael F. Atiyah, The index of elliptic operators on compact manifolds (index theorem)
254. Mohamed S. Baouendi, Les opérateurs de convolution, d'après Ehrenpreis et Hörmander (convolution operators)
255. Pierre Cartier, Représentations linéaires des groupes algébriques semi-simples en caractéristique non nulle, d'après Steinberg (representation theory of algebraic groups)
256. Jean Giraud, Analysis situs, d'après Artin et Grothendieck (topos theory)
257. Roger Godement, Domaines fondamentaux des groupes arithmétiques (fundamental domains of arithmetic groups)
258. Leopoldo Nachbin, Régularité des solutions des équations différentielles elliptiques, d'après Moser (elliptic differential operators)

== 1963–64 ==
259. Adrien Douady, Démonstration élémentaire d'un théorème de périodicité de Bott, d'après Atiyah et Bott (Bott periodicity)
260. Roger Godement, Quelques résultats nouveaux de Kostant sur les groupes semi-simples (semisimple groups)
261. Hervé Jacquet, Mémoire de Langlands sur la dimension des espaces de formes automorphes (automorphic forms)
262. Bernard Malgrange, Problèmes aux limites elliptiques (elliptic boundary value problems)
263. Claude Morlet, Microfibrés et structures différentiables (microbundles)
264. René Thom, Travaux de Moser sur la stabilité des mouvements périodiques (dynamical systems)
265. Armand Borel, Cohomologie et rigidité d'espaces compacts localement symétriques, d'après Weil et Matsushima (locally symmetric spaces)
266. Daniel Lacombe, Théorèmes de non-décidabilité (undecidability)
267. Pierre Samuel, Travaux d'Igusa sur les formes modulaires de genre 2 (modular forms)
268. Gérard Schiffmann, Frontières de Furstenberg et formules de Poisson sur un groupe de Lie semi-simple (Furstenberg boundary)
269. Laurent Schwartz, Les travaux de Seeley sur les opérateurs intégraux singuliers sur une variété (singular integral operators)
270. Jean-Pierre Serre, Groupes analytiques p-adiques, d'après M. Lazard (p-adic Lie groups)
271. François Bruhat, Sous-groupes compacts maximaux des groupes semi-simples p-adiques (maximal compact subgroups)
272. Pierre Cartier, Processus aléatoires généralisés (stochastic processes)
273. Did not take place
274. Serge Lang, Les formes bilinéaires de Néron et Tate (canonical height)
275. Bernard Malgrange, Majorations a priori et d″-cohomologie, d'après Hörmander (a priori bounds)
276. Gérard Rauzy, Points transcendents sur les variétés de groupe, d'après Lang (transcendental number theory)

== 1964–65 ==
277. Adrien Douady, Le problème des modules pour les variétés analytiques complexes, d'après M. Kuranishi
278. Roger Godemont, Analyse spectrale des fonctions modulaires (Modular function)
279. Alexander Grothendieck, Formule de Lefschetz et rationalité des fonctions L
280. André Haefliger, Sphères d'homotopie nouées
281. René Thom, Propriétés différentielles locales des ensembles analytiques, d'après H. Whitney
282. Nicholas Varopoulos, Measure algebras of a locally compact abelian group (Measure algebra)
283. Pierre Cartier, Equivalence linéaire des idéaux de polynômes, d'après R. Hartshorne
284. Luc Illusie, Contractibilité du groupe linéaire des espaces de Hilbert de dimension infinie, d'après N. Kuiper
285. Hervé Jacquet, La transformation de Radon sur un espace symétrique, d'après S. Helgason
286. Michel Raynaud, Caractéristique d'Euler-Poincaré d'un faisceau et cohomologie des variétés abéliennes, d'après Šafarevic, Ogg et Grothendieck
287. Pierre Samuel, La conjecture de Mordell pour les corps de fonctions, d'après Manin et Grauert
288. Jacques Tits, Structures et groupes de Weyl (Weil group)
289. Pierre Grisvard, Méthodes opérationnelles dans l'étude des problèmes aux limites
290. Alexander Grothendieck, Le groupe de Brauer, I : Algèbres de Azumaya et interprétations diverses (Brauer group)
291. Jean-Pierre Kahane, Algèbres tensorielles et analyse harmonique, d'après N. Varopoulos (Tensor algebras and Harmonic analysis)
292. Serge Lang, Corps de fonctions méromorphes sur une surface de Riemann
293. Paul-André Meyer, Le théorème ergodique de Chacón-Ornstein
294. Jaap Murre, Representation of unramified functors. Applications (Category theory)
