= Séminaire Nicolas Bourbaki =

Mathematical seminars held in Paris since 1948

The Séminaire Nicolas Bourbaki (from French: Bourbaki Seminar) is a series of seminars (in fact public lectures with printed notes distributed) that has been held in Paris since 1948. It is one of the major institutions of contemporary mathematics, and a barometer of mathematical achievement, fashion, and reputation. It is named after Nicolas Bourbaki, a pseudonymous group of French and other mathematicians of variable membership.

The Poincaré Seminars are a series of talks on physics inspired by the Bourbaki seminars on mathematics.

== 1948/49 series ==
1. Henri Cartan, Les travaux de Koszul, I (Lie algebra cohomology)
2. Claude Chabauty, Le théorème de Minkowski-Hlawka (Minkowski-Hlawka theorem)
3. Claude Chevalley, L'hypothèse de Riemann pour les corps de fonctions algébriques de caractéristique p, I, d'après Weil (local zeta-function)
4. Roger Godement, Groupe complexe unimodulaire, I : Les représentations unitaires irréductibles du groupe complexe unimodulaire, d'après Gelfand et Neumark (representation theory of the complex special linear group)
5. Léo Kaloujnine, Sur la structure de p-groupes de Sylow des groupes symétriques finis et de quelques généralisations infinies de ces groupes (Sylow theorems, symmetric groups, infinite group theory)
6. Pierre Samuel, La théorie des correspondances birationnelles selon Zariski (birational geometry)
7. Jean Braconnier, Sur les suites de composition d'un groupe et la tour des groupes d'automorphismes d'un groupe fini, d'après H. Wielandt (finite groups)
8. Henri Cartan, Les travaux de Koszul, II (see 1)
9. Claude Chevalley, L'hypothèse de Riemann pour les groupes de fonctions algébriques de caractéristique p, II, d'après Weil (see 3)
10. Luc Gauthier, Théorie des correspondances birationnelles selon Zariski (see 6)
11. Laurent Schwartz, Sur un mémoire de Petrowsky : "Über das Cauchysche Problem für ein System linearer partieller Differentialgleichungen im gebiete nichtanalytischen Funktionen" (partial differential equations)
12. Henri Cartan, Les travaux de Koszul, III (see 1)
13. Roger Godement, Groupe complexe unimodulaire, II : La transformation de Fourier dans le groupe complexe unimodulaire à deux variables, d'après Gelfand et Neumark (see 4)
14. Marc Krasner, Les travaux récents de R. Brauer en théorie des groupes (finite groups)
15. Laurent Schwartz, Sur un deuxième mémoire de Petrowsky : "Über das Cauchysche Problem für System von partiellen Differentialgleichungen" (see 11)
16. André Weil, Théorèmes fondamentaux de la théorie des fonctions thêta, d'après des mémoires de Poincaré et Frobenius (theta functions)

== 1949/50 series ==
17. André Blanchard, Groupes algébriques et équations différentielles linéaires, d'après E. Kolchin (differential Galois theory)
18. Jean Dieudonné, Géométrie des espaces algébriques homogènes, d'après W. L. Chow (algebraic geometry)
19. Roger Godement, Sommes continues d'espaces de Hilbert, I (functional analysis, direct integrals)
20. Charles Pisot, Démonstration élémentaire du théorème des nombres premiers, d'après Selberg et Erdös (prime number theorem)
21. Georges Reeb, Propriétés des trajectoires de certains systèmes dynamiques (dynamical systems)
22. Pierre Samuel, Anneaux locaux; introduction à la géométrie algébrique (local rings)
23. Marie-Hélène Schwartz, Compte-rendu de travaux de M. Heins sur diverses majorations de la croissance des fonctions analytiques et sous-harmoniques (complex analysis, subharmonic functions)
24. Charles Ehresmann, Les connexions infinitésimales dans un espace fibré différentiable (connections on fiber bundles)
25. Roger Godement, Sommes continues d'espaces de Hilbert, II (see 19)
26. Laurent Schwartz, Sur un mémoire de K. Kodaira : "Harmonic fields in riemannian manifolds (generalized potential theory)", I (Hodge theory)
27. Jean-Pierre Serre, Extensions de groupes localement compacts, d'après Iwasawa et Gleason (locally compact groups)
28. René Thom, Les géodésiques dans les variétés à courbure négative, d'après Hopf (geodesics)
29. Armand Borel, Groupes localement compacts, d'après Iwasawa et Gleason (see 27)
30. Jacques Dixmier, Facteurs : classification, dimension, trace (von Neumann algebras)
31. Jean-Louis Koszul, Algèbres de Jordan (Jordan algebras)
32. Laurent Schwartz, Sur un mémoire de K. Kodaira : "Harmonic fields in riemannian manifolds (generalized potential theory)", II (see 26)

For later years see:

- Séminaire Nicolas Bourbaki (1950–1959)
- Séminaire Nicolas Bourbaki (1960–1969)
- Séminaire Nicolas Bourbaki (1970–1979)
- Séminaire Nicolas Bourbaki (1980–1989)
- Séminaire Nicolas Bourbaki (1990–1999)

== Publishers ==
The proceedings of the Séminaire have been published by four different publishers over the years. 1948/49 through 1964/65 were published as Textes des conférences / Séminaire Bourbaki by the Secrétariat Mathématique, Université Paris. In 1966, W. A. Benjamin, Inc. issued a special twelve-volume facsimile reproduction of the Séminaire Bourbaki, 1948-1965. W. A. Benjamin, Inc. continued to publish the proceedings for three more years, 1965/66 through 1967/68. Springer-Verlag published 1968/69 through 1980/81 as part of its Lecture Notes in Mathematics series. 1981/82 to date are published by the Société Mathématique de France as part of Astérisque.
