= Bourbaki =

Bourbaki(s) may refer to:

== Persons and science ==
- Charles-Denis Bourbaki (1816–1897), French general, son of Constantin Denis Bourbaki
- Colonel Constantin Denis Bourbaki (1787–1827), officer in the Greek War of Independence and serving in the French military
- Nicolas Bourbaki, the collective pseudonym of a group of French mathematicians
  - Séminaire Nicolas Bourbaki and its follow-ups
    - Séminaire Nicolas Bourbaki (1950–1959)
    - Séminaire Nicolas Bourbaki (1960–1969)
  - Bourbaki–Witt theorem
  - Bourbaki–Alaoglu theorem
  - Jacobson–Bourbaki theorem
- Nikolaos Bourbakis, computer scientist

== Other ==
- A place in Algeria, now known as Khemisti, near Aïn-Tourcia and the site of ancient city and former bishopric Columnata
- Bourbaki dangerous bend symbol
