= Dehn's lemma =

Theorem in topology

In mathematics, Dehn's lemma asserts that a piecewise-linear map of a disk into a 3-manifold, with the map's singularity set in the disk's interior, implies the existence of another piecewise-linear map of the disk which is an embedding and is identical to the original on the boundary of the disk.

This theorem was thought to be proven by Max Dehn (1910), but Hellmuth Kneser (1929, page 260) found a gap in the proof. The status of Dehn's lemma remained in doubt until Christos Papakyriakopoulos (1957, 1957b) using work by Johansson (1938) proved it using his "tower construction". He also generalized the theorem to the loop theorem and sphere theorem.

== Tower construction ==
Papakyriakopoulos proved Dehn's lemma using a tower of covering spaces. Soon afterwards Arnold Shapiro and J.H.C. Whitehead (1958) gave a substantially simpler proof, proving a more powerful result. Their proof used Papakyriakopoulos' tower construction, but with double covers, as follows:

- Step 1: Repeatedly take a connected double cover of a regular neighborhood of the image of the disk to produce a tower of spaces, each a connected double cover of the one below it. The map from the disk can be lifted to all stages of this tower. Each double cover simplifies the singularities of the embedding of the disk, so it is only possible to take a finite number of such double covers, and the top level of this tower has no connected double covers.
- Step 2. If the 3-manifold has no connected double covers then all its boundary components are 2-spheres. In particular the top level of the tower has this property, and in this case it is easy to modify the map from the disk so that it is an embedding.
- Step 3. The embedding of the disk can now be pushed down the tower of double covers one step at a time, by cutting and pasting the 2-disk.
