= Max Shertz =

American painter

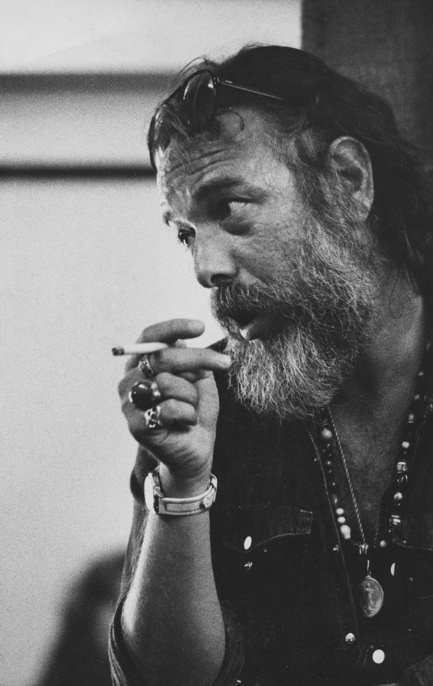
- Born: March 25, 1933; Brooklyn, New York
- Died: October 15, 2009 (aged 76)
- Education: Art Students League of New York
- Known for: Painting, drawing, sculpture
- Movement: Abstract expressionism
- Website: www.maxshertz.com

Max Shertz (March 25, 1933 – October 15, 2009) was an American artist, painter, sculptor, writer, poet, and teacher. Shertz is known for his abstract expressionism style. His works is displayed and collected within museums, public institutions, and by collectors. In protest against the commercialization of the art world, Shertz was reclusive for the last 25 years of his life, and the work Shertz produced during those years has not been released to the public.

== Early years ==
Art is simplicity, purity and truth. True Art comes from a source unknown to the mind, it is a gift coming through you, your Unconscious.

— Max Shertz

Shertz was born in Brooklyn, to parents who married young and divorced when he was 5 years old. Shertz's maternal family were musicians, his great grandfather, Professor Gottlieb, and his seven children formed a classical ensemble performing all over Europe and in New York.

Shertz demonstrated an interest for art at an early age. At 17 Shertz joined the Marines. After returning from Korea, he studied at the New York Art Students League, where he apprenticed under, and was influenced by, Hans Hofmann and Raphael Soyer, who would later become his close friends. Shertz then moved to Hollywood, where he lived with his uncle, neurosurgeon Daniel Weller, and Weller's wife, columnist writer Helen and sister of Herman Hoover, owner of Ciro's, a famous night club of the 1940s and 1950s. While in Hollywood Shertz worked as an agent and television actor. In 1956 Shertz met his first wife, Edith Tunik (Edi), and they had four children: Marla, Dana, Joshua and Nilda. Disillusioned with show business and drawn to his first love, art, Shertz left Hollywood to devote himself to painting. During that time he apprenticed with the artist Boris Deutsch.

"Self Portrait" Chalk on board, 1987

In addition to Hofman and Jackson Pollock, Shertz was also influenced by André Masson, the father of automatism and influential in the American Expressionist movement. Starting in the 1960s, Shertz's work was figurative and abstract expressionist.

Art in America said of Shertz's work in 1972:

I have followed this talent closely for a number of years, carefully appraising the obvious good taste, sincerity, elegance and distinction seen in the painted results. Improvisation enters strongly into his paintings with lyricism and line of color poetically aligned while a rhythmic movement throughout prevails. The paintings are invariably enhanced with color, luminosity and the sparkle of paint handling that is frequently startling and impressive. Viewed were oil and pastel on paper, a medium that seems to have been willed into the hands of its creator. Mr. Shertz bears constant watching lest we miss a superb young stylist whose destiny is secure in the hands of posterity.

The Herald Tribune in 1973 said of Shertz:

In examining the art of Max Shertz it is important to mention the evident personal quality of his style. In general, painters strive for this characteristic in their work and many achieve it to varying degree. Yet the major portion of the art product is oft times too reminiscent of earlier greats. Not so here. Dynamic would describe his color harmony and on close scrutiny this style and touch are totally unique, if one is permitted to take liberty with the word. The result here seems to have a ‘newness’ and a privacy about it that refreshes.

Shertz was the first American painter to be exhibited at the Manila Cultural Center of the Philippines. "Festival of the Three Bridges" was commissioned by City Center, Alvin Ailey II in 1971. Although not religious in the traditional sense, his Jewish identity was important to him. He created works related to the Holocaust, including several murals. The "Story of Judaism", a 20-foot mural at Mount Zion Hospital in San Francisco, was dedicated by the late George Moscone in 1976. His artist series portraits, which included Picasso, Braque, Chagall, Masson, Hofmann, Klee, Krasner, Pollock, Gorky, Kandinsky, Miró and Shertz himself, appear on the Nichols Winery Masterpiece Art series wine collections.

Shertz also taught art for more than twenty years. As a teacher, he said: "I want to awaken passion and mysticism, and to establish lost contact with the unique creator, the ever unknown unconscious master who lives next to the soul and spirit. All true art, whether painting, sculpture, writing or poetry emanates from the magic unconscious. How to unleash this magic is never explored by conventional or traditional schools of art."

Throughout the 1970s and 1980s Shertz lived in San Francisco, Los Angeles, and New York. He lived with his wife, Edie, as well as his mistress, muse, and future wife Christiane, whom he had his fifth child with, Jed Shertz.

Shertz eventually divorced Edie and Married his long time companion Christiane in Reno, Nevada.

== Reclusive period ==
This society is wrong for me as an artist, and I cannot remain unaffected. Artists now reflect the culture of consumerism and never challenge it. When art sinks to the level of merchandise, it loses the greater part of its truth, and then loses its purity and its essence.

— Max Shertz

"Thunderbolt" Acrylic on paper, 1993

In the early 1980s, Shertz grew disenchanted with what he saw as the commercialization of the art world, and was reclusive for the last 25 years of his life. The work Shertz produced during those years has not been released to the public. Shertz did not release his writings, either, including essays "Frontiers of Ecstasy", "Brooklyn Boy", "Portrait of A Man", "Poker Lord", as well as poems.

Shertz's explorations with his art reached Henry Hopkins, the 1990s director of the Los Angeles Hammer Museum, who stated, "Max Shertz with his Art of the Unconscious takes automatism and abstract expressionism to a new dimension making a breakthrough in 20th century art."

Shertz remarked of his own work:

There is great evidence from the past that art is prologue and that fine art is always a movement outward from within and catches even the flickering light and exposes the slightest glimmer in a vast gulf of darkness. For half a century, I have created while searching and exploring my inner creator. Within those fifty years, I have been surrounded by those reasoned conscious so-called works of art done from the outside in, art done for economic purpose, art that is conceptual and art that is sentimental and sanctimonious.

== Museums and public acquisitions ==
- Brooklyn Museum of Art, New York City, New York
- The Royal Family, Their Royal Highness' King Baudouin and Queen Fabiola of Belgium, the Palace

== Awards and commendations ==
- Commendation: President’s Office, State of Israel
