= Arnold S. Shapiro =

American mathematician (1921 to 1962)

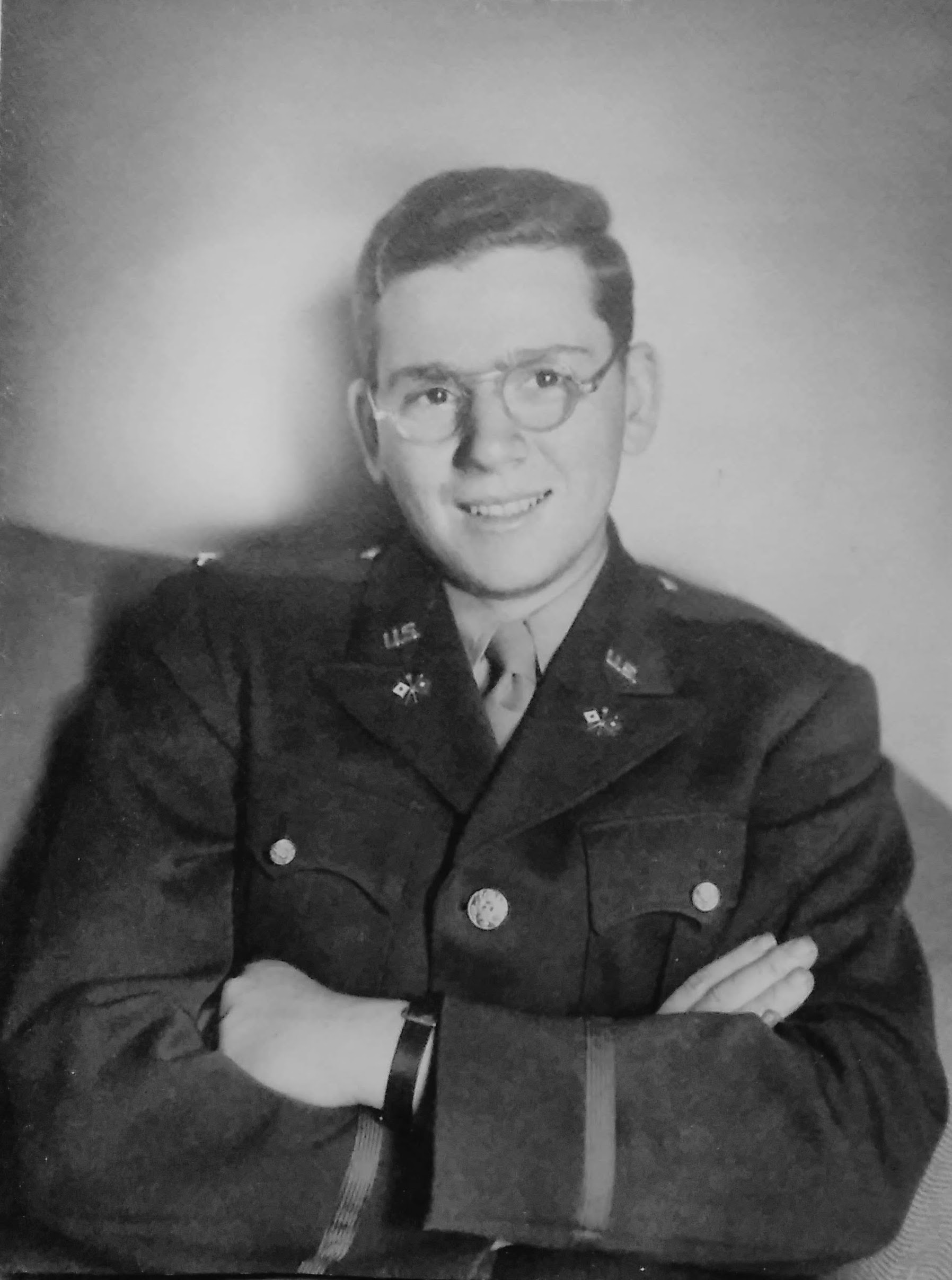
Arnold S. Shapiro in uniform prior to shipping out to Europe during World War II

Arnold Samuel Shapiro (June 5, 1921, Brookline, Massachusetts – May 1, 1962, Newton, Massachusetts) was an American mathematician known for his eversion of the sphere and Shapiro's lemma. He also was the author of an article on Clifford algebras and periodicity with Raoul Bott, later redone by Michael Atiyah and Bott.

== Life ==
During WWII Shapiro was in the US Army signal corps stationed in Belgium.

In 1949 Shapiro was a student of Norman Steenrod at University of Michigan. He wrote an article "Group extensions of compact groups" and was awarded a master's degree.

In 1950 Shapiro was a student of André Weil at University of Chicago. With a dissertation "Cohomology relations in fiber bundles", he was awarded a Ph.D.

He continued his studies at the Institute for Advanced Study from 1955 to 57. Raoul Bott was also at the Institute at that time; he recounted his mathematical contacts in an AMS-MAA invited address August 9, 1988, in Providence Rhode Island:

During that time, and largely at Princeton, I met Serre, Thom, Hirzebruch, Atiyah, Singer, Milnor, Borel, Harish-Chandra, James, Adams,... I could go on and on. But these people, together with Kodaira and Spencer, and my more or less "personal remedial tutor", Arnold Shapiro, were the ones I had the most mathematical contact with.

In 2000 Allyn Jackson interviewed Bott, who then revealed Shapiro's part in the Periodicity Theorem. He explained that there was a controversy in dimension 10 about the homotopy of the unitary group.

I hit upon a very complicated method involving the exceptional group G_{2} to check the conundrum independently. My good friend Arnold Shapiro and I spent all weekend computing. At the end we came out on the side of Borel and Hirzebruch, so I was convinced that they were right. And if they were right, the table of homotopy groups started to look periodic for a long stretch.

In 1957 Shapiro published an extension of Dehn's lemma after a method of Papakyriakopoulos. In 1961 Shapiro contributed to the Bourbaki Seminar his "Algèbres de Clifford et periodicité des groupes π_{K}(BO))". The topic was taken up again in 1964 as Clifford modules by Bott and Atiyah with Shapiro named as an author, though he had died.

In December 1960 Shapiro spoke with Bernard Morin about turning a sphere inside-out. This oral communication was later recalled in the Mathematical Intelligencer article "Arnold Shapiro's eversion of the sphere". The authors remark, "His is not the simplest, nor the most interesting of the many explicit eversions that have been devised since. It is, however, the only one to use standard topological constructions."

Arnold Shapiro died in 1962 in Newton, Massachusetts where he was a tenured professor at Brandeis University. Each year an undergraduate student of mathematics at Brandeis University is awarded a Shapiro Prize in memory of Arnold.
