= Hiroyuki Hamada =

Hiroyuki Hamada may refer to:

- Hiroyuki Hamada (martial artist) (1925–2003), Japanese martial artist
- Hiroyuki Hamada (artist) (born 1968), Japanese-born American artist
