= Preparation theorem =

Preparation theorem may refer to:

- Malgrange preparation theorem
- Weierstrass preparation theorem
