= Konstantinos Papaioannou =

Konstantinos Papaioannou (Greek: Κωνσταντίνος Παπαϊωάννου; 1899 – 6 October 1979) was a Greek physicist, mathematician, and professor of mechanics at the University of Athens.

== Biography ==
He was born in Athens in 1899. He completed secondary school in Athens and then studied at the National Technical University of Athens. He graduated there in 1919 with a degree from the School of Mechanical and Electrical Engineering. He continued his studies at the University of Athens, where he obtained a degree in mathematics and then a doctorate in mathematics. He was appointed a professor of the University of Athens and became a member of the Academy of Athens.

Papaioannou was an Invited Speaker of the ICM in 1928 in Bologna, in 1932 in Zurich, and in 1936 in Oslo. He died on October 6, 1979, the same day that Anastasios Orlandos died.

Papaionnou was the (unofficial) referee for the famous 154-page doctoral thesis of Christos Papakyriakopoulos and had the mathematical ability to immediately foresee Papakyriakopoulos's successful research career.

== Sources ==
- Εθνικόν και Καποδιστριακόν Πανεπιστήμιον Αθηνών (National and Kapodistrian University of Athens), Μιχαήλ Στεφανίδης (Mikhail Stefanidis), ed. (1948). Εκατονταετηρίς 1837 - 1937, Τόμος Ε', Ιστορία της Φυσικομαθηματικής Σχολής (Hundreds of years 1837 - 1937, Volume E, History of Physical and Mathematical School). Αθήναι (Athens): Πυρσός Α.Ε (Pyrsos Ltd.).
