= Malgrange–Zerner theorem =

Theorem about holomorphic functions of several complex variables

In mathematics, Malgrange–Zerner theorem (named for Bernard Malgrange and Martin Zerner) shows that a function on $\mathbb{R}^n$ allowing holomorphic extension in each variable separately can be extended, under certain conditions, to a function holomorphic in all variables jointly. This theorem can be seen as a generalization of Bochner's tube theorem to functions defined on tube-like domains whose base is not an open set.

Theorem Let

$$X=\bigcup_{k=1}^n \mathbb{R}^{k-1}\times P \times \mathbb{R}^{n-k},
\text{   where   }P=\mathbb{R}+i [0,1),$$

and let $W=$ convex hull of $X$. Let $f: X\to \mathbb{C}$ be a locally bounded function such that $f \in C^\infty(X)$ and that for any fixed point $(x_1,\ldots, x_{k-1},x_{k+1},\ldots,x_n)\in \mathbb{R}^{n-1}$ the function $f(x_1,\ldots, x_{k-1},z,x_{k+1},\ldots,x_n)$ is holomorphic in $z$ in the interior of $P$ for each $k=1,\ldots,n$. Then the function $f$ can be uniquely extended to a function holomorphic in the interior of $W$.

== History ==
According to Henry Epstein, this theorem was proved first by Malgrange in 1961 (unpublished), then by Zerner (as cited in), and communicated to him privately. Epstein's lectures contain the first published proof (attributed there to Broz, Epstein and Glaser). The assumption $f \in C^\infty(X)$ was later relaxed to $f|_{\mathbb{R}^n}\in C^3$ (see Ref.[1] in) and finally to $f|_{\mathbb{R}^n}\in C$.
