= Universal embedding theorem =

Theorem in group theory

The universal embedding theorem, or Krasner–Kaloujnine universal embedding theorem, is a theorem from the mathematical discipline of group theory first published in 1951 by Marc Krasner and Lev Kaluznin. The theorem states that any group extension of a group H by a group A is isomorphic to a subgroup of the regular wreath product A Wr H. The theorem is named for the fact that the group A Wr H is said to be universal with respect to all extensions of H by A.

== Statement ==
Let H and A be groups, let K = A^{H} be the set of all functions from H to A, and consider the action of H on itself by multiplication. This action extends naturally to an action of H on K, defined as $(h\cdot \phi)(g)=\phi(h^{-1}g),$ where $\phi\in K,$ and g and h are both in H. This is an automorphism of K, so we can construct the semidirect product K ⋊ H, which is termed the regular wreath product, and denoted A Wr H or $A\wr H.$ The group K = A^{H} (which is isomorphic to $\{(\phi,1)\in A\wr H:\phi\in K\}$) is called the base group of the wreath product.

The Krasner–Kaloujnine universal embedding theorem states that if G has a normal subgroup A and H = G/A, then there is an injective homomorphism of groups $\theta:G\to A\wr H$ such that A maps surjectively onto $\text{im}(\theta)\cap K.$ This is equivalent to the wreath product A Wr H having a subgroup isomorphic to G, where G is any extension of H by A.

== Proof ==
This proof comes from Dixon–Mortimer.

Define a homomorphism $\psi:G\to H$ whose kernel is A. Choose a set $T=\{t_u:u\in H\}$ of (right) coset representatives of A in G, where $\psi(t_u)=u.$ Then for all x in G, $t_u^{-1} x t_{\psi(x)^{-1}u}\in\ker \psi=A.$ For each x in G, we define a function $f_x:H\to A$ such that $f_x(u)=t_u^{-1} x t_{\psi(x)^{-1}u}.$ Then the embedding $\theta$ is given by $\theta(x)=(f_x,\psi(x))\in A\wr H.$

We now prove that this is a homomorphism. If x and y are in G, then $\theta(x)\theta(y)=(f_x(\psi(x).f_y),\psi(xy)).$ Now $\psi(x).f_y(u)=f_y(\psi(x)^{-1}u),$ so for all u in H,

$$f_x(u)(\psi(x).f_y(u)) = t_u^{-1} x t_{\psi(x)^{-1}u} t_{\psi(x)^{-1}u}^{-1} y t_{\psi(y)^{-1}\psi(x)^{-1}u}=t_u xy t^{-1}_{\psi(xy)^{-1}u},$$

so f_{x} f_{y} = f_{xy}. Hence $\theta$ is a homomorphism as required.

The homomorphism is injective. If $\theta(x)=\theta(y),$ then both f_{x}(u) = f_{y}(u) (for all u) and $\psi(x)=\psi(y).$ Then $t_u^{-1} x t_{\psi(x)^{-1}u}=t_u^{-1} y t_{\psi(y)^{-1}u},$ but we can cancel $t^{-1}_{u}$ and $t_{\psi(x)^{-1}u}=t_{\psi(y)^{-1}u}$ from both sides, so x = y, hence $\theta$ is injective. Finally, $\theta(x)\in K$ precisely when $\psi(x)=1,$ in other words when $x\in A$ (as $A=\ker\psi$).

== Generalizations and related results ==
- The Krohn–Rhodes theorem is a statement similar to the universal embedding theorem, but for semigroups. A semigroup S is a divisor of a semigroup T if it is the image of a subsemigroup of T under a homomorphism. The theorem states that every finite semigroup S is a divisor of a finite alternating wreath product of finite simple groups (each of which is a divisor of S) and finite aperiodic semigroups.
- An alternate version of the theorem exists which requires only a group G and a subgroup A (not necessarily normal). In this case, G is isomorphic to a subgroup of the regular wreath product A Wr (G/Core(A)).

== Bibliography ==
- Dixon, John; Mortimer, Brian (1996). Permutation Groups. Springer. ISBN 978-0387945996.
- Kaloujnine, Lev; Krasner, Marc (1951a). "Produit complet des groupes de permutations et le problème d'extension de groupes II". Acta Sci. Math. Szeged. 14: 39–66. Archived from the original on 2024-11-19.
- Kaloujnine, Lev; Krasner, Marc (1951b). "Produit complet des groupes de permutations et le problème d'extension de groupes III". Acta Sci. Math. Szeged. 14: 69–82.
- Praeger, Cheryl; Schneider, Csaba (2018). Permutation groups and Cartesian Decompositions. Cambridge University Press. ISBN 978-0521675062.
