= Cartier duality =

In mathematics, Cartier duality is an analogue of Pontryagin duality for commutative group schemes. It was introduced by Pierre Cartier (1962).

== Definition using characters ==
Given any finite flat commutative group scheme G over a scheme S, its Cartier dual is the group of characters, defined as the functor that takes any S-scheme T to the abelian group of group scheme homomorphisms from the base change $G_T$ to $\mathbf{G'}_{m,T}$ and any map of S-schemes to the canonical map of character groups. This functor is representable by a finite flat S-group scheme, and Cartier duality forms an additive involutive antiequivalence from the category of finite flat commutative S-group schemes to itself. If G is a constant commutative group scheme, then its Cartier dual is the diagonalizable group D(G), and vice versa. If S is affine, then the duality functor is given by the duality of the Hopf algebras of functions.

== Definition using Hopf algebras ==
A finite commutative group scheme over a field corresponds to a finite dimensional commutative cocommutative Hopf algebra. Cartier duality corresponds to taking the dual of the Hopf algebra, exchanging the multiplication and comultiplication.

== More general cases of Cartier duality ==
The definition of Cartier dual extends usefully to much more general situations where the resulting functor on schemes is no longer represented as a group scheme. Common cases include fppf sheaves of commutative groups over S, and complexes thereof. These more general geometric objects can be useful when one wants to work with categories that have good limit behavior. There are cases of intermediate abstraction, such as commutative algebraic groups over a field, where Cartier duality gives an antiequivalence with commutative affine formal groups, so if G is the additive group $\mathbf{G'}_a$, then its Cartier dual is the multiplicative formal group $\widehat{\mathbf{G}}_m$, and if G is a torus, then its Cartier dual is étale and torsion-free. For loop groups of tori, Cartier duality defines the tame symbol in local geometric class field theory. Gérard Laumon introduced a sheaf-theoretic Fourier transform for quasi-coherent modules over 1-motives that specializes to many of these equivalences.

== Examples ==
- The Cartier dual of the cyclic group $\Z/n\Z$ of order n is the n-th roots of unity $\mu_n$.
- Over a field of characteristic p the group scheme $\alpha_p$ (the kernel of the endomorphism of the additive group induced by taking pth powers) is its own Cartier dual.
