= Godement resolution =

Sheaf theory concept

The Godement resolution of a sheaf is a construction in homological algebra that allows one to view global, cohomological information about the sheaf in terms of local information coming from its stalks. It is useful for computing sheaf cohomology. It was discovered by Roger Godement.

== Overview ==
Given a topological space X (more generally, a topos X with enough points), and a sheaf F on X, the Godement construction for F gives a sheaf $\operatorname{Gode}(F)$ constructed as follows. For each point $x\in X$, let $F_x$ denote the stalk of F at x. Given an open set $U\subseteq X$, define

$$\operatorname{Gode}(F)(U):=\prod_{x\in U} F_x.$$

An open subset $U\subseteq V$ clearly induces a restriction map $\operatorname{Gode}(F)(V)\rightarrow \operatorname{Gode}(F)(U)$, so $\operatorname{Gode}(F)$ is a presheaf. One checks the sheaf axiom easily. One also proves easily that $\operatorname{Gode}(F)$ is flabby, meaning each restriction map is surjective. The map $\operatorname{Gode}$ can be turned into a functor because a map between two sheaves induces maps between their stalks. Finally, there is a canonical map of sheaves $F\to \operatorname{Gode}(F)$ that sends each section to the 'product' of its germs. This canonical map is a natural transformation between the identity functor and $\operatorname{Gode}$.

Another way to view $\operatorname{Gode}$ is as follows. Let $X_{\text{disc}}$ be the set X with the discrete topology. Let $p \colon X_{\text{disc}} \to X$ be the continuous map induced by the identity. It induces adjoint direct and inverse image functors $p_*$ and $p^{-1}$. Then $\operatorname{Gode} = p_* \circ p^{-1}$, and the unit of this adjunction is the natural transformation described above.

Because of this adjunction, there is an associated monad on the category of sheaves on X. Using this monad there is a way to turn a sheaf F into a coaugmented cosimplicial sheaf. This coaugmented cosimplicial sheaf gives rise to an augmented cochain complex that is defined to be the Godement resolution of F.

In more down-to-earth terms, let $G_0(F) = \operatorname{Gode}(F)$, and let $d_0\colon F\rightarrow G_0(F)$ denote the canonical map. For each $i>0$, let $G_i(F)$ denote $\operatorname{Gode}(\operatorname{coker}(d_{i-1}))$, and let $d_i\colon G_{i-1}\rightarrow G_i$ denote the canonical map. The resulting resolution is a flabby resolution of F, and its cohomology is the sheaf cohomology of F.

== Definition ==
Let $X$ be a topological space, $\mathsf{Ab}(X)$ the category of Abelian sheaves on $X$ (the construction holds more generally in sheaves with more algebraic structure, e.g. sheaves of vector spaces, modules or rings). The Godement resolution is a sequence of covariant functors $\mathcal{G}^k:\mathsf{Ab}(X)\rightarrow\mathsf{Ab}(X)$ ($k=0,1,2,...$) and natural transformations $\varepsilon: \boldsymbol{1}\rightarrow \mathcal{G}^0$, $\delta_k:\mathcal{G}^k\rightarrow\mathcal{G}^{k+1}$ ($\boldsymbol{1}$ is the identity functor) such that for any sheaf $\mathcal{S}\in\mathsf{Ab}(X)$

- $\mathcal{G}^k(\mathcal{S})$ is a flabby sheaf;
- $0\xrightarrow{}\mathcal{S}\xrightarrow{\varepsilon}\mathcal{G}^0(\mathcal{S})\xrightarrow{\delta}\mathcal{G}^1(\mathcal{S})\xrightarrow{\delta}\cdots$ is a resolution of $\mathcal{S}$.

Recall that a sheaf space (or étalé space) is a triple $(E,\pi,X)$ where $E$ is a topological space, $\pi$ is a surjective local homeomorphism, and each fibre $E_x=\pi^{-1}(x)$ has the structure of an Abelian group such that the map $E\times_XE\rightarrow E,\quad (s_0,s_1)\mapsto s_0 - s_1$ is continuous. A morphism of sheaf spaces $f:(E,\pi,X)\rightarrow(E^\prime,\pi^\prime,X)$ is a continuous map between the spaces $E$ and $E^\prime$ such that $\pi^\prime\circ f = \pi$.

Moreover, the association $U\mapsto\Gamma(U,E)$ sending each open set $U\subseteq X$ to the Abelian group of all continuous sections of $\pi$ (frequently abbreviated as sections of $E$, although this is an abuse of terminology) is an Abelian sheaf, and the functor $\mathrm{Sec}:\mathsf{Et}(X)\rightarrow\mathsf{Ab}(X)$ sending each sheaf space $(E,\pi,X)$ to the sheaf $\mathrm{Sec}(E,\pi,X):=U\mapsto\Gamma(U,E)$ and each morphism $f:(E,\pi,X)\rightarrow(E^\prime,\pi^\prime,X)$ into the operator $\phi\mapsto f\circ\phi$ of composition with a section $\phi\in\Gamma(U,E)$ is an equivalence of categories.

For simplicity, given a sheaf denoted $\mathcal{S}$, let its associated sheaf space be denoted $\mathbf{S}$, and implicitly identify each section $\phi\in\mathcal{S}(U)$ with the corresponding continuous section of the sheaf space.

A serration of $\mathcal{S}$ (or equivalently, of $\mathbf{S}$) over the open set $U\subseteq X$ is a local section $\phi:U\rightarrow\mathbf{S},\ \ \pi\circ\phi=\mathrm{Id}_U$ that does not need to be continuous. If $\mathcal{G}^0(\mathcal{S})(U)$ denotes the set of all serrations over $U$, then this set is equipped with a natural Abelian group structure, $\mathcal{G}^0(\mathcal S)$ is an Abelian sheaf, and since every continuous section is also a serration, there is a natural monomorphism $\varepsilon:\mathcal{S}\rightarrow\mathcal{G}^0(\mathcal{S})$ of sheaves.

Now define $\mathcal{F}^1(\mathcal{S}):=\mathcal{G}^0(\mathcal{S})/\mathcal{S}$, and iterate this construction by replacing $\mathcal{S}$ with $\mathcal{F}^1(\mathcal{S})$, producing $\mathcal{G}^1(\mathcal{S}):=\mathcal{G}^0(\mathcal{F}^1(\mathcal{S}))$ and $\mathcal{F}^2(\mathcal{S}):=\mathcal{G}^1(\mathcal{S})/\mathcal{F}^1(\mathcal{S})$, and so on. Once $\mathcal{G}^0(\mathcal{S}),\dots,\mathcal{G}^{k-1}(\mathcal{S})$ and $\mathcal{F}^1(\mathcal{S}),\dots,\mathcal{F}^{k}(\mathcal{S})$ have been constructed, then one can define, recursively,
$$\mathcal{G}^k(\mathcal{S}):=\mathcal{G}^0(\mathcal{F}^k(\mathcal{S})),\quad \mathcal{F}^{k+1}(\mathcal{S}):=\mathcal{G}^k(\mathcal{S})/\mathcal{F}^k(\mathcal{S}).$$
By construction, the short sequences $0\rightarrow\mathcal{F}^k(\mathcal{S})\rightarrow\mathcal{G}^k(\mathcal{S})\rightarrow\mathcal{F}^{k+1}(\mathcal{S})\rightarrow 0$ are exact, thus concatenating them produces the long exact sequence
$$0\xrightarrow{}\mathcal{S}\xrightarrow{\varepsilon}\mathcal{G}^0(\mathcal{S})\xrightarrow \delta \mathcal{G}^1(\mathcal{S})\xrightarrow\delta \mathcal{G}^2(\mathcal{S})\xrightarrow\delta\cdots,$$
where $\delta:\mathcal{G}^k(\mathcal{S})\rightarrow\mathcal{G}^{k+1}(\mathcal{S})$ is given by the composition $\mathcal{G}^k(\mathcal{S})\rightarrow\mathcal{F}^{k+1}(\mathcal{S})\rightarrow\mathcal{G}^{k+1}(\mathcal{S})$.

== Properties ==
=== Functoriality ===
Each sheaf $\mathcal{G}^k(\mathcal{S})$ and $\mathcal{F}^k(\mathcal{S})$ that appears in the above construction is functorial in its argument $\mathcal{S}$, in the sense that it is an additive endofunctor of the category $\mathsf{Ab}(X)$. For $\mathcal{G}^0$ this is easy to see since any morphism $f:\mathcal{S}\rightarrow\mathcal{S}^\prime$ of sheaves induces a corresponding morphism (denoted the same way) $f:\mathbf{S}\rightarrow\mathbf{S}^\prime$ between their sheaf spaces, and any serration $\phi\in\mathcal{G}^0(\mathcal{S})(U)$ may be composed as $\phi\mapsto f\circ\phi\in\mathcal{G}^0(\mathcal{S})(U)$. Evidently, if $\phi$ is continuous, then so is its image, hence the morphism (also denoted the same way) $f:\mathcal{G}^0(\mathcal{S})\rightarrow\mathcal{G}^0(\mathcal{S}^\prime)$ takes the subsheaf $\mathcal{S}$ into the subsheaf $\mathcal{S}^\prime$ (essentially trivially), consequently, there is also an induced morphism $\mathcal{F}^1(\mathcal{S})\rightarrow\mathcal{F}^1(\mathcal{S}^\prime)$.

It is easy to verify that the induced morphisms satisfy all compositional rules needed for functoriality, hence $\mathcal{G}^0$ and $\mathcal{F}^1$ are functors. But since the higher degree Godement sheaves $\mathcal{G}^{k\ge 1}$ and $\mathcal{F}^{k\ge2}$ are constructed iteratively by the same procedure, these are compositions of functors and are hence themselves functors.

=== Flabbiness ===
For any open set $U\subseteq X$, let $\phi\in\mathcal{G}^0(\mathcal{S})(U)$. Then we can extend $\phi$ to a global section $\hat\phi :X\rightarrow \mathbf{S}$ by setting
$$\hat\phi(x)=\left\{\begin{matrix}\phi(x) & x\in U \\ 0 & x\in X\setminus U\end{matrix}\right. .$$
Hence, $\mathcal{G}^0(\mathcal{S})$ is flabby for any sheaf $\mathcal{S}$. Since we have $\mathcal{G}^k = \mathcal{G}^0\circ\mathcal{F}^k$, it follows then that the higher degree Godement sheaves are also flabby.

=== Exactness ===
For any short exact sequence $0\rightarrow\mathcal{S}^\prime\rightarrow\mathcal{S}\rightarrow\mathcal{S}^{\prime\prime}\rightarrow 0$ of sheaves, and any $k\ge 0$, the sequence
$$0\rightarrow\mathcal{G}^k(\mathcal{S}^\prime)\rightarrow\mathcal{G}^k(\mathcal{S})\rightarrow\mathcal{G}^k(\mathcal{S}^{\prime\prime})\rightarrow 0$$
is also exact, hence $\mathcal{G}^k$ is an exact functor.

For $k = 0$, this follows from a simple direct computation, then consider the short exact sequence $0\rightarrow \mathcal{S}^\bullet\rightarrow\mathcal{G}^0(\mathcal{S}^\bullet)\rightarrow\mathcal{F}^1(\mathcal{S}^\bullet)\rightarrow 0$ of complexes (where $\mathcal{S}^\bullet$ stands for $0\rightarrow\mathcal{S}^\prime\rightarrow\mathcal{S}\rightarrow\mathcal{S}^{\prime\prime}\rightarrow 0$), where the first two complexes are exact, thus the cohomology long exact sequence implies that $0\rightarrow\mathcal{F}^1(\mathcal{S}^\prime)\rightarrow\mathcal{F}^1(\mathcal{S})\rightarrow\mathcal{F}^1(\mathcal{S}^{\prime\prime})\rightarrow 0$ is exact as well, therefore $\mathcal{F}^1$ is also an exact functor. Then the exactness of $\mathcal{G}^{k\ge 1}$ and $\mathcal{F}^{k\ge 2}$ follows from iterating the same argument.

Actually, slightly more can be said. Define the functors $G^k:\mathsf{Ab}(X)\rightarrow\mathsf{Ab},\ G^k(\mathcal{S}):=\mathcal{G}^k(\mathcal{S})(X)$, and recall the well-known theorem that if $0\rightarrow\mathcal{S}^\prime\rightarrow\mathcal{S}\rightarrow\mathcal{S}^{\prime\prime}\rightarrow 0$ is any short exact sequence of sheaves where $\mathcal{S}^\prime$ is flabby, then
$$0\rightarrow\mathcal{S}^\prime(X)\rightarrow\mathcal{S}(X)\rightarrow\mathcal{S}^{\prime\prime}(X)\rightarrow 0$$
is also exact. Since $\mathcal{G}^k(\mathcal{S})$ is flabby for any sheaf $\mathcal{S}$, the sequence
$$0\rightarrow G^k(\mathcal{S}^\prime)\rightarrow G^k(\mathcal{S})\rightarrow G^k(\mathcal{S}^{\prime\prime})\rightarrow 0$$
is also exact, hence the $G^k$ are also exact functors.

== Relation to sheaf cohomology ==
The main use of the Godement resolution is to define sheaf cohomology. In the literature there exist (at least) three methods by which the cohomology of sheaves can be constructed, via

1. Čech cohomology;
2. the Godement resoution;
3. derived functors (injective resolutions).

This list is ordered in terms of increasing generality. Čech cohomology can be defined for any topological space, but it is guaranteed to agree with the other forms of sheaf cohomology only if the space is a paracompact Hausdorff space, the approach via the Godement resolution works on any space and agrees with derived functor cohomology, while the latter can be defined generally also for sheaves on sites.

For sheaves on topological spaces, the Godement resolution has a number of advantages over derived functor cohomology due to the fact that it is canonical and the Godement functors are exact.

As an illustration, recall the fact that the category $\mathsf{Ab}(X)$ of Abelian sheaves has enough injectives, meaning that for any sheaf $\mathcal{S}$ there is a monomorphism $\mathcal{S}\rightarrow\mathcal{I}$ into an injective sheaf. This is highly non-constructive, the standard proof involves constructing an injective group $I(x)$ for each point $x\in X$. Let $\mathcal{I}^0$ be an injective sheaf into which $\mathcal{S}$ embeds, then take $\mathcal{I}^1$ to be an injective sheaf into which the quotient $\mathcal{I}^0/\mathcal{S}$ embeds, and so on. This constructs a resolution
$$0\rightarrow\mathcal{S}\rightarrow\mathcal{I}^0\rightarrow\mathcal{I}^1\rightarrow\mathcal{I}^2\rightarrow\cdots$$
where each sheaf $\mathcal{I}^k$ is injective. The derived functor approach to sheaf cohomology then defines $H^k(X,\mathcal{S}):= H^k(\mathcal{I}^\bullet(X))$, i.e. the kth cohomology of $X$ with coefficients in $\mathcal{S}$ is equal to the kth cohomology of the complex
$$0 \rightarrow\mathcal{I}^0 (X)\rightarrow\mathcal{I}^1 (X)\rightarrow\mathcal{I}^2 (X)\rightarrow\cdots .$$
However, since the injective resolution of the sheaf is not canonical, this definition becomes well-defined only if one shows that the cohomology groups are independent of the choice of injective resolution. Furthermore, one must show that the cohomology long exact sequence exists. Both of these follows from highly general categorical arguments coming from the properties of injective objects.

It is also possible to define an injective resolution which is canonical in the sense that it is functorial in the initial sheaf, but these functors fail to be exact, which means that the existence of the cohomology long exact sequence has to be proven by different means.

In the approach via the Godement resolution, one defines the sheaf cohomology groups to be $H^k(X,\mathcal{S}):= H^k(G^\bullet(\mathcal S))$, where the latter is the kth cohomology of the complex
$$0\rightarrow G^0(\mathcal{S})\rightarrow G^1(\mathcal{S})\rightarrow G^2(\mathcal{S})\rightarrow\cdots$$
and $G^k(\mathcal{S}) := \mathcal{G}^k(\mathcal{S})(X)$. This is manifestly well-defined as the resolution is canonically given for any sheaf, and since the functors $G^k$ are exact, the existence of the long exact sequence follows from a simple argument.

=== Sheaf cohomology axioms ===
A sheaf cohomology theory on a topological space $X$ consists of a sequence $H^0(X,-), H^1(X,-),\dots$ of covariant functors from $\mathsf{Ab}(X)$ to $\mathsf{Ab}$ such that the following properties are satisfied:

1. $H^0(X,\mathcal{S})=\mathcal{S}(X)$ for any sheaf $\mathcal{S}$;
2. for any short exact sequence $0\rightarrow\mathcal{S}^\prime\rightarrow\mathcal{S}\rightarrow\mathcal{S}^{\prime\prime}\rightarrow 0$ there is a corresponding long exact sequence$0\rightarrow\mathcal{S}^\prime(X)\rightarrow\mathcal{S}(X)\rightarrow\mathcal{S}^{\prime\prime}(X) \rightarrow H^1(X,\mathcal{S}^\prime)\rightarrow H^1(X,\mathcal{S})\rightarrow H^1(X,\mathcal{S}^{\prime\prime}) \rightarrow H^2(X,\mathcal{S}^\prime)\rightarrow \cdots$ of sheaf cohomology groups which is natural or functorial in the sense that any morphism $\mathcal{S}^\bullet\rightarrow\mathcal{T}^\bullet$ of short exact sequences of sheaves induces a corresponding morphism of their cohomology long exact sequences.

Theorem: The functors $H^k(X,-):= H^k(G^\bullet(-))$ satisfy the sheaf cohomology axioms.

Proof: For the complex $G^\bullet(\mathcal{S})$, the zeroth cohomology is
$$H^0(G^\bullet(\mathcal{S}))=\ker(G^0(\mathcal{S})\rightarrow G^1(\mathcal{S}))
=\ker(\mathcal{G}^0(\mathcal{S})\rightarrow\mathcal{G}^1(\mathcal{S}))(X)
=\mathrm{im}(\mathcal{S}\rightarrow\mathcal{G}^0(\mathcal{S}))(X) .$$
Since the latter is the section space of the image of a sheaf monomorphism, it follows that $H^0(G^\bullet(\mathcal{S}))=\mathcal{S}(X)$.

Then for any short exact sequence $0\rightarrow\mathcal{S}^\prime\rightarrow\mathcal{S}\rightarrow\mathcal{S}^{\prime\prime}\rightarrow 0$, consider the commutative diagram
$$\begin{matrix}
& & 0 & & 0 & & 0 \\
& & \downarrow & & \downarrow & & \downarrow & & \\
0 & \rightarrow & G^0(\mathcal{S}^\prime) & \rightarrow & G^0(\mathcal{S}) & \rightarrow & G^0(\mathcal{S}^{\prime\prime}) & \rightarrow & 0 \\
& & \downarrow & & \downarrow & & \downarrow & & \\
0 & \rightarrow & G^1(\mathcal{S}^\prime) & \rightarrow & G^1(\mathcal{S}) & \rightarrow & G^1(\mathcal{S}^{\prime\prime}) & \rightarrow & 0 \\
& & \downarrow & & \downarrow & & \downarrow & & \\
0 & \rightarrow & G^2(\mathcal{S}^\prime) & \rightarrow & G^2(\mathcal{S}) & \rightarrow & G^2(\mathcal{S}^{\prime\prime}) & \rightarrow & 0 \\
& & \downarrow & & \downarrow & & \downarrow & & \\
& & \vdots & & \vdots & & \vdots & & \\
\end{matrix} .$$
The rows are exact because the $G^k$ are exact functors, so this is a short exact sequence $0\rightarrow G^\bullet(\mathcal{S}^\prime)\rightarrow G^\bullet(\mathcal{S})\rightarrow G^\bullet(\mathcal{S}^{\prime\prime})\rightarrow 0$ of complexes, and the corresponding cohomology long exact sequence reads
$$0 \rightarrow \mathcal{S}^\prime(X) \rightarrow \mathcal{S}(X) \rightarrow \mathcal{S}^{\prime\prime}(X)
\rightarrow H^1(G^\bullet(\mathcal{S}^\prime)) \rightarrow H^1(G^\bullet(\mathcal{S}))\rightarrow H^1(G^\bullet(\mathcal{S}^{\prime\prime}))
\rightarrow H^2(G^\bullet(\mathcal{S}^\prime))\rightarrow\cdots$$
which establishes the second axiom as well.

=== Acyclicity and flabby sheaves ===
A sheaf $\mathcal{S}$ is acyclic if each higher cohomology group vanishes, that is $H^k(X,\mathcal{S})=0,\ \ k>0$. It is an important fact, that sheaf cohomology can also be computed from acyclic resolutions. This follows directly from the sheaf cohomology axioms, since if
$$0\rightarrow\mathcal{S}\rightarrow\mathcal{A}^0\rightarrow\mathcal{A}^1\rightarrow\mathcal{A}^2\rightarrow\cdots$$
is an exact sequence where the sheaves $\mathcal{A}^k$ are acyclic, then breaking it down into short exact sequences of the form $0\rightarrow\mathcal{Z}^k\rightarrow\mathcal{A}^k\rightarrow\mathcal{Z}^{k+1}\rightarrow 0$, where $\mathcal{Z}^k:=\ker(\mathcal{A}^k\rightarrow\mathcal{A}^{k+1})$, and applying the sheaf cohomology long exact sequence to each, the cohomology long exact sequence decomposes into exact sequences
$$0\rightarrow\mathcal{Z}^k(X)\rightarrow\mathcal{A}^k(X)\rightarrow\mathcal{Z}^{k+1}(X)\rightarrow H^1(X,\mathcal{Z}^k)\rightarrow 0,\ \ k\ge 0,$$
and $0\rightarrow H^p(X,\mathcal{Z}^{k+1})\rightarrow H^{p+1}(X,\mathcal{Z}^k)\rightarrow 0,\ \ p\ge 1,\ k\ge 0.$

The first implies that $H^1(X,\mathcal{Z}^k)\cong H^{k+1}(\mathcal{A}^\bullet(X))$, while the second that $H^p(X,\mathcal{Z}^{k+1})\cong H^{p+1}(X,\mathcal{Z}^k).$ Together these give$H^k(X,\mathcal{S})\cong H^k(\mathcal{A}^\bullet(X))$ (technically, the proof is valid only for $k\ge 1$, but the validity for $k=0$ is essentially trivial).

A proof very similar to the one above then establishes that whenever an exact sequence $0\rightarrow\mathcal{S}^0\rightarrow\mathcal{S}^1\rightarrow\mathcal{S}^2\rightarrow\cdots$ is given in which every sheaf is flabby, then the cohomology $H^k(\mathcal{S}^\bullet(X))$ of the sequence of global sections vanishes.

Since the Godement sheaves are flabby, for any flabby sheaf $\mathcal{S}$, the Godement resolution is an exact sequence in which every sheaf is flabby. Thus, $H^k(X,\mathcal{S})=0$, whenever $k>0$.

Consequently,

- flabby sheaves are acyclic, and
- sheaf cohomology can be computed generally by flabby resolutions.
