= Krasner =

Krasner is a surname. Notable people with the surname include:

- Gerald Krasner (born 1949), former chairman of Leeds United A.F.C.
  - Krasner v McMath
- Larry Krasner (born 1961), American lawyer, District Attorney of Philadelphia
- Lee Krasner (1908–1984), American artist
  - Pollock-Krasner House and Studio
  - Pollock-Krasner Foundation
- Lisa Krasner, American politician
- Louis Krasner (1903–1995), Russian-American violinist and teacher
- Marc Krasner (1912-1985), Russian-French mathematician known for
  - Krasner's lemma, in number theory
- Milton R. Krasner, American film cinematographer
- Naum Krasner (1924–1999), Ukrainian/Russian mathematician and economist
- Stephen D. Krasner (born 1942), political scientist and author
- Steven Krasner (born 1953), sports writer and author of children's books

== See also ==
- Michael Krassner (born 1971), American musician and composer
- Paul Krassner (1932–2019), author, journalist, stand-up comedian
- Krasna (disambiguation)
