= Linda Preiss Rothschild =

American mathematician

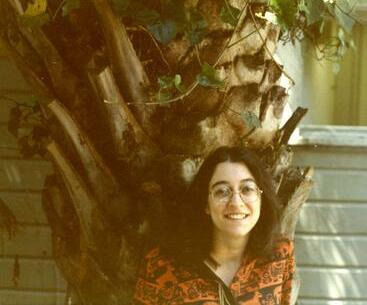
- Rothschild in Berkeley, 1974
- Born: Linda Preiss; February 28, 1945 (age 81); Philadelphia, Pennsylvania
- Citizenship: United States
- Education: University of Pennsylvania; Massachusetts Institute of Technology (PhD)
- Spouse: M. Salah Baouendi
- Children: 2
- Scientific career
- Fields: Mathematics
- Workplaces: University of California, San Diego
- Doctoral advisor: Isadore Singer

Linda Preiss Rothschild (née Preiss; born February 28, 1945) is a professor emeritus of mathematics at the University of California, San Diego. Her thesis research concerned Lie groups, but subsequently her interests broadened to include also polynomial factorization, partial differential equations, harmonic analysis, and the theory of several complex variables.

== Education and career ==
The daughter of Philadelphia fur merchants, she was unable to attend the best high school of the city, which were then restricted to boys. She graduated from the University of Pennsylvania in 1966. Rejected from graduate study at Princeton University because it was also male-only, she earned her Ph.D. in 1970 from the Massachusetts Institute of Technology under the supervision of Isadore Singer.

She held temporary positions at MIT, Tufts University, Columbia University, the Institute for Advanced Study, and Princeton University before landing an associate professorship at the University of Wisconsin in 1976. She moved to San Diego in 1983, and retired in 2011.

Rothschild was a Member at Large at the AMS from 1977 to 1979. She served as president of the Association for Women in Mathematics from 1983 to 1985, and vice president of the American Mathematical Society from 1985 to 1987. She has been co-editor-in-chief of the journal Mathematical Research Letters since 1994.

The mother of two sons by her first marriage, her second husband, M. Salah Baouendi, was a distinguished professor of mathematics at UC San Diego; he died in 2011.

== Awards and honors ==
Rothschild was awarded a Sloan Fellowship in 1976. In 1997, Rothschild gave the Noether Lecture of the Association for Women in Mathematics, on the subject "How do Real Manifolds live in Complex Space?", and she was an invited speaker at the International Congress of Mathematicians in 2006. She was elected as a fellow of the American Academy of Arts and Sciences in 2005, and in 2012 she became one of the inaugural fellows of the American Mathematical Society. A conference in her honor was held in 2008 at the University of Fribourg in Switzerland. In 2017, she was selected as a fellow of the Association for Women in Mathematics in the inaugural class.

She and her husband were jointly awarded the Stefan Bergman Prize of the American Mathematical Society in 2003.
