= Hiroyuki Hamada (artist) =

Japanese-American sculptor (born 1968)

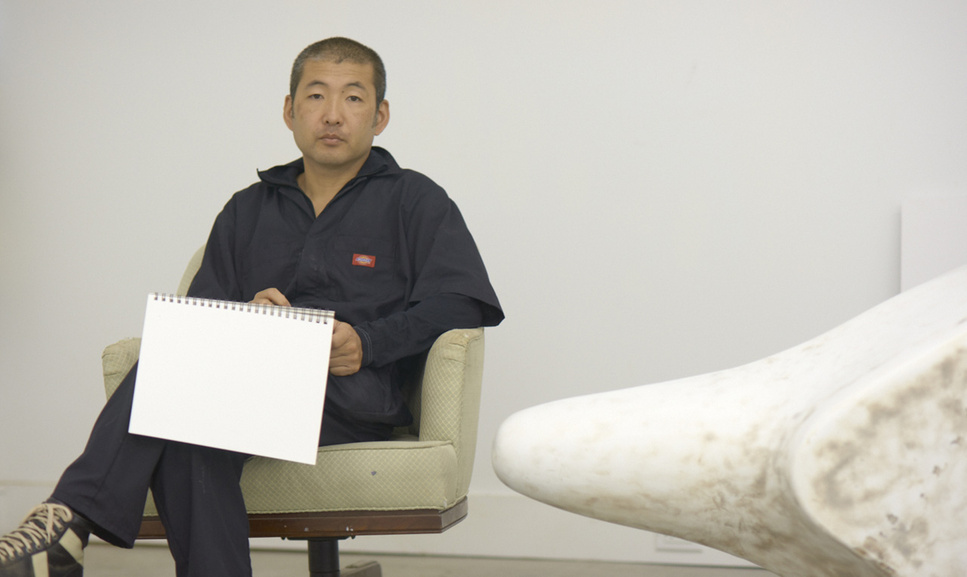
- Born: March 21, 1968 (age 58)
- Known for: Painting, sculpture
- Website: hiroyukihamada.com

Hiroyuki Hamada (Japanese: 浜田 博之, born March 21, 1968, in Tokyo) is a Japanese born sculptor based in the United States.

He is represented by Bookstein Projects, New York.

== Biography ==
Hiroyuki Hamada grew up in Japan until the age of eighteen, then moved with his family to Wheeling, West Virginia where his father held a temporary post in the steel industry; the culture shock Hamada experienced was underscored by the linguistic gap, and it was through the study of drawing while in college that Hamada found an outlet to bridge the gap. He changed his major from psychology to studio art, then went on to earn a master's degree in Fine Art from the University of Maryland.

Hamada has been awarded residencies at the Provincetown Fine Arts Work Center, the Edward F. Albee Foundation/William Flanagan Memorial Creative Person's Center, the Skowhegan School of Painting and Sculpture, the MacDowell Colony, Studios Midwest in Illinois, and the Virginia Center of the Creative Arts. In 1998, Hamada was the recipient of a Pollock-Krasner Foundation grant, and in 2009 he was awarded a New York Foundation for the Arts Fellowship. The artist lives and works in East Hampton, New York.

== Techniques and aesthetics ==
#63, 2006–10, 45 x 40 x 24 inches, burlap, enamel, oil, plaster, resin, tar, wax and wood

Hiroyuki Hamada is distinguished for achieving extraordinary effects of spatial depth through a time-consuming, meticulous process. In his 2007 foreword to an exhibition catalog (Hiroyuki Hamada; Pierre Menard gallery), Edward Albee points out "the tough power and the 'here I am, as I am' quality of the work."

Hamada transforms non-art materials, enamel, tar, wax, burlap, plastic, into powerful artistic forms, and arranges those industrial and even brutal materials in gentle, smooth shapes. Surfaces are "richly textured", often marked by sectioning. Cited in Art: A Brief History for his contribution to "new ideas in traditional materials," Stokstad notes, "There is an archetypal quality to his elemental sculptural forms.They seem strange but at the same time hauntingly familier, remaining open to a variety of viewer associations." The output is a series of non-representational artworks, named by numbers in a sequence. "As an artist he tries to ignore outside references, preferring instead for his work to come from a truly interior space. His artwork is a product of the mind, unburdened by the need to think in real world images".

By objectivizing the idea through two different techniques, painting and sculpture, two opposite fields, Hamada comes to a sort of hegelian synthesis, where the "stream of time" is itself objectivized within a universal form. Hamada refuses labels, but it seems to be unavoidable not to catch in his figures his Japanese background. The black and white chromatism of some of his works is reminiscent of Japanese calligraphy, and the smoothed dark texture of other pieces recalls an inkstone. Some others that take the shape of a holed circle call to mind the ensō, and all the more so because of the semantics characterizing Hamada's output, which lie in a pre-linguistic world.

An inspiration to the designer Damir Doma for his fall/winter 2011 collection, Hamada's works were shown at the opening of L'Atelier Damir Doma Boutique Éphémère. Referring to Hamada's #55 the designer said, "I adore this piece of art for its timelessness. It's hard to define the time and the place it's coming from. There is no clear reference to the piece but I believe it explains my work. I'm creating classics through repetition of shapes and textures."

== Grants and awards ==
- 2009 New York Foundation for the Arts Fellowship, New York City
- 2003 Edward F. Albee Foundation/William Flanagan Memorial Creative Persons Center, Montauk, Long Island (residency)
- 2000 Emergency Artist Trust Award, Provincetown Community Compact, Provincetown, Massachusetts
- 1998 The Pollock-Krasner Foundation, Inc., New York City
- 1998 Edward F. Albee Foundation/William Flanagan Memorial Creative Persons Center, Montauk, Long Island (residency)
- 1998 Skowhegan School of Painting and Sculpture, Skowhegan, Maine (Skowhegan fellowship)
- 1997 Virginia Center for the Creative Arts, Sweet Brior, Virginia (fellowship towards residency)
- 1996 MacDowell Colony, Peterborough, New Hampshire (The Milton and Sally Avery Fellowship)
- 1996 Visual Artist-in-Residence Program at Studios Midwest, Galesburg, Illinois
- 1995–1996 Fine Arts Work Center in Provincetown, Provincetown, Massachusetts (Alexander C. and Tillie S. Speyer Fellowship)

== Solo exhibitions ==
- 2013 Lori Bookstein Fine Art, New York City
- 2011 Roger Williams University, Bristol, Rhode Island
- 2009 Berkshire Community College, Pittsfield, Massachusetts
- 2007 Hiroyuki Hamada, Pierre Menard Gallery, Cambridge, Massachusetts
- 2004 DNA Gallery, Provincetown, Massachusetts
- 2000 O.K. Harris Works of Art, New York City
- 1999 Featured Artists' Exhibition, DNA Gallery, Provincetown, Massachusetts
- 1996 Featured Artists' Exhibition, DNA Gallery, Provincetown, Massachusetts

== Selected group exhibitions ==
- 2013 [Mostly] White, Lori Bookstein Fine Art, New York
- 2005 Flying Space Gallery, Sag Harbor, New York
- 2001 Benefit Exhibition and Auction (for Skowhegan), Knoedler & Company, New York City
- 2000 33rd Springs Invitational Exhibition, Ashawagh Hall, Springs, New York
- 2000 25th Anniversary Exhibition, City Without Walls, Newark, New Jersey
- 1998 17th Annual Metro Show, City Without Walls, Newark, New Jersey (traveled around the metro area)
- 1996 The Provincetown Art Association and Museum, Provincetown, Massachusetts
- 1996 New Talent, Alpha Gallery, Boston, Massachusetts
- 1995 Multi-Perspectives III (National Juried Exhibition), An Art Place, Inc. Gallery Chicago, Illinois. Juried by Ray Yoshida.
- 1995 Art MD '95, Howard County Center for the Arts, Ellicott City, Maryland. Juried by Phyllis Rosenzweig, Associate Curator, Hirshorn Museum and Sculpture Garden, Smithsonian Institution.
