= Mean-periodic function =

In mathematical analysis, the concept of a mean-periodic function is a generalization introduced in 1935 by Jean Delsarte of the concept of a periodic function. Further results were made by Laurent Schwartz and J-P Kahane.

== Definition ==
Consider a continuous complex-valued function f of a real variable. The function f is periodic with period a precisely if for all real x, we have f(x) − f(x − a) = 0. This can be written as

$$\int f(x-t) \, d\mu(t) = 0\qquad\qquad(1)$$

where $\mu$ is the difference between the Dirac measures at 0 and a. The function f is mean-periodic if it satisfies the same equation (1), but where $\mu$ is some arbitrary nonzero measure with compact (hence bounded) support.

Equation (1) can be interpreted as a convolution, so that a mean-periodic function is a function f for which there exists a compactly supported (signed) Borel measure $\mu$ for which $f*\mu = 0$.

There are several well-known equivalent definitions.

== Relation to almost periodic functions ==
Mean-periodic functions are a separate generalization of periodic functions from the almost periodic functions. For instance, exponential functions are mean-periodic since exp(x+1) − e.exp(x) = 0, but they are not almost periodic as they are unbounded. Still, there is a theorem which states that any uniformly continuous bounded mean-periodic function is almost periodic (in the sense of Bohr). In the other direction, there exist almost periodic functions which are not mean-periodic.

== Some basic properties ==
If f is a mean periodic function, then it is the limit of a certain sequence of exponential polynomials which are finite linear combinations of term t^^n exp(at) where n is any non-negative integer and a is any complex number; also Df is a mean periodic function (ie mean periodic) and if h is an exponential polynomial, then the pointwise product of f and h is mean periodic).

If f and g are mean periodic then f + g and the truncated convolution product of f and g is mean periodic. However, the pointwise product of f and g need not be mean periodic.

If L(D) is a linear differential operator with constant co-efficients, and L(D)f = g, then f is mean periodic if and only if g is mean periodic.

For linear differential difference equations such as Df(t) - af(t - b) = g where a is any complex number and b is a positive real number, then f is mean periodic if and only if g is mean periodic.

== Applications ==
In work related to the Langlands correspondence, the mean-periodicity of certain (functions related to) zeta functions associated to an arithmetic scheme have been suggested to correspond to automorphicity of the related L-function. There is a certain class of mean-periodic functions arising from number theory.

== See also ==
- almost periodic functions
