= M. Salah Baouendi =

Tunisian-American mathematician

Mohammed Salah Baouendi (Arabic: محمد صالح باوندي; October 12, 1937 in Tunis – December 24, 2011 in La Jolla, California) was a Tunisian-American mathematician who worked as a Distinguished Professor of Mathematics at the University of California, San Diego. His research concerned partial differential equations and the theory of several complex variables.

== Education and career ==
Baouendi moved from Tunis to France after finishing his Baccalauréat in the high school Sadiki College, and earned a licence (a French undergraduate degree) in 1961 from the Sorbonne. In this he had the assistance of a scholarship from the Tunisian government, which however demanded that he return to Tunis afterwards to become a schoolteacher. After the intervention of Laurent Schwartz, Baouendi was allowed to return to France for his graduate studies. He completed a doctorate in 1967 from the University of Paris-Sud (then part of the University of Paris), under the supervision of Bernard Malgrange, with a dissertation concerning elliptic operators. Schwartz attempted to secure for him a suitable academic position in Tunis, in which he would be allowed to conduct research and collaborate with mathematicians from other countries, and Baouendi became an associate professor at Tunis University in 1968, but his administrative struggles there were too much, and he left in 1970. After a short stay at the University of Nice, Baouendi moved in 1971 to the USA.

Baouendi's first American faculty position was at Purdue University. During his tenure at Purdue, he was promoted to full professor in 1973, became department chair from 1980 to 1987, and also held visiting positions at Pierre and Marie Curie University, the University of Chicago, and Rutgers University. He became a Distinguished Professor at UCSD in 1988 (giving up his Purdue professorship in 1990). He was a co-founder of two journals, Communications in Partial Differential Equations and Mathematical Research Letters.

== Awards and honors ==
Baouendi was given the Prix d'Aumale of the French Academy of Sciences in 1969. He was an invited speaker at the International Congress of Mathematicians in 1974. He and his wife, mathematician Linda Preiss Rothschild, were jointly awarded the Stefan Bergman Prize of the American Mathematical Society in 2003. In 2005 he became a fellow of the American Academy of Arts and Sciences.

== See also ==
- Moungi Bawendi (his son), winner of the 2023 Nobel Prize in Chemistry.
