= Christos Papakyriakopoulos =

Greek mathematician (1914–1976)

Christos Dimitriou Papakyriakopoulos (Greek: Χρήστος Δημητρίου Παπακυριακόπουλος; June 29, 1914 – June 29, 1976), commonly known as Papa, was a Greek mathematician specializing in geometric topology.

== Early life ==
Papakyriakopoulos was born in Chalandri, then in the Municipality of Athens, now in North Athens.

== Career ==
Papakyriakopoulos worked in isolation at Athens Polytechnic as research assistant to Professor Nikolaos Kritikos. But he was enrolled as research student at Athens University, being awarded a PhD in 1943 on the recommendation of Constantin Carathéodory. In 1948, he was invited by Ralph Fox to come as his guest at the Princeton University mathematics department because Fox had been impressed by a letter from Papakyriakopoulos that purported to prove Dehn's lemma. The proof, as it turned out, was faulty, but Fox's sponsorship would continue for many years and enabled Papakyriakopoulos to work on his mathematics without concern for financial support.

Papakyriakopoulos is best known for his proofs of Dehn's lemma, the loop theorem, and the sphere theorem, three foundational results for the study of 3-manifolds. In honor of this work, he was awarded the first Oswald Veblen Prize in Geometry in 1964. From the early 1960s on, he mostly worked on the Poincaré conjecture. Bernard Maskit produced counterexamples about his proof three times.

== Tribute ==
The following unusual limerick was composed by John Milnor, shortly after learning of several graduate students' frustration at completing a project where the work of every Princeton mathematics faculty member was to be summarized in a limerick:

The perfidious lemma of Dehn
Was every topologist's bane
'Til Christos D. Pap-
akyriakop-
oulos proved it without any strain.

This may be the only limerick where one word spans three lines. The phrase "without any strain" is not meant to indicate that Papa did not expend much energy in his efforts. Rather, it refers to Papa's "tower construction", which quite nicely circumvents much of the difficulty in the cut-and-paste efforts that preceded Papa's proof.

== Other activities ==
Papakyriakopoulos sympathized with leftist politics and in 1941 joined the student branch of the National Liberation Front (EAM). When he went to live in the US, in 1948 the Greek authorities reported him to the American authorities as a "dangerous communist" and asked for his extradition, but Princeton Institute of Advanced Study gave him protection as it had done with others suffering political persecution.

He was a reclusive character, spending most of his time in his office listening to his beloved Richard Wagner. Legend has it that in the United States he lived for 25 years in the same hotel room he used when he first arrived in the country, all of his belongings inside his original luggage.

== Death ==
Papakyriakopoulos died of stomach cancer at age 62 in Princeton, New Jersey.

== See also ==
- List of Greek mathematicians
- Konstantinos Papaioannou
