= Lev Kaluznin =

Soviet mathematician

Lev Arkad'evich Kaluznin
- Born: 31 January 1914; Moscow, Russia
- Died: 6 December 1990 (aged 76); Moscow, Russia
- Other names: Léo Kaloujnine, Lev A. Kalužnin, Lev A. Kaluzhnin
- Citizenship: Russian
- Spouse: Zoya Mikhailovna Volotskaya
- Scientific career
- Fields: Mathematician

Lev Arkad'evich Kaluznin (Russian: Лев Аркадьевич Калужнин) (31 January 1914 – 6 December 1990) was a Russian mathematician. Other transliterations of his name used by himself include Kalužnin and Kaluzhnin, while he used the transliteration Léo Kaloujnine in publications while he lived in France.

== Biography and education ==
Kaluznin was born in Moscow. His parents divorced not long after his birth, and his father, Arkadii Rubin, moved to England and was not part of Kaluznin's life. His mother, Maria Pavlovna Kaluznina, moved with the young Kaluznin to Petrograd (present-day Saint Petersburg), where she brought him up. She shared her love for Russian culture, including music and literature, with her son, and she would remain an important part of his life. In 1923, Kaluznin and his mother moved to Germany. She worked as a governess, while Kaluznin was enrolled at a Realgymnasium (secondary school), graduating in 1933. His school offered a thorough education in mathematics, and upon graduating, he entered the Humboldt University of Berlin, where he attended lectures taught by the algebraist Issai Schur. He left the university in 1936 and enrolled at the University of Hamburg. Here, he was taught by Emil Artin, Erich Hecke and Hans Zassenhaus. In 1938 he published his first paper, in which he completed a theorem of Kurosh on the classification of abelian groups.

In 1938, Kaluznin and his mother moved to Paris, where Kaluznin became a student at the Sorbonne. World War II and in particular the German occupation of Paris in June 1940 made it necessary for him to halt his studies. To make a living, he trained as an electrician. On 22 June 1941, Soviet citizens living in France were interned at a camp in Compiègne near Paris. Here, Kaluznin was initially able to continue studying mathematics, carrying out research on Galois theory, which determines if certain equation solutions can be written with rational functions. He also attended lectures on a variety of topics given by other prisoners.

In March 1942, Kaluznin was moved to a concentration camp in Wahlsburg, Bavaria. Conditions here were much more difficult than in the internment camp back in France. His mother was able to send him food while he was at the concentration camp. Otherwise, he might not have survived. After the war, Kaluznin returned to Paris. He got some work translating for the Soviet Embassy in Paris but was finally able to return to his mathematical studies. In 1948, he defended his doctoral dissertation on Sylow p-subgroups of symmetric groups. In the following years, he published several papers, some of them with Marc Krasner, and presented his research at academic conferences.

Kaluznin and his mother decided to move back to the USSR. They applied to the Soviet immigration authorities, who requested that he should work in East Germany, where there was a shortage of scientists, for some time. In 1951, Kaluznin returned to Humboldt University in Berlin. Here, he held a post of Hochschuldozent, and following the presentation of his Habilitation thesis on stable automorphism groups, a post as Privatdozent, or full professor.

== Return to USSR ==
Finally, in 1955, Kaluznin was able to return to the USSR. Various mathematicians worked on his behalf to get him a professorship at Kiev State University, which he would hold until 1985. In 1957 he had to defend a third thesis titled ‘Sylow p-subgroups of symmetric groups. Complete products of groups. Generalizations of Galois theory.’ In 1959 he created and became head of the department of algebra and mathematical logic; he also promoted the creation of a department of mathematical linguistics at the state university, maybe due to his marriage in 1962 to linguist Zoya Mikhailovna Volotskaya. They lived separate most of their life but did have two children.

Due to his time abroad in Germany and France, he was seen as a foreigner. In the 1970s, after openly pronouncing his opinion against closed political trials, he had to leave a couple of the positions he had, including his position as head of department of algebra and mathematical logic. This prevented him from going to conferences abroad, and he had to try to do his work by mail. He focused on his students, various research projects and the new area of computer algebra. His students very much enjoyed his lectures. In the mid 1980s his son Mikhail came under government scrutiny due to Mikhail's interest in religion, which did not make things easier for his father. Eventually Kaluznin was forced to retire and moved back to Moscow. His health deteriorated, and he died as a result of burns from an accident.

Outside of mathematics, Kaluznin had many interests. He loved classical music, philosophy and western literature. Until 1970, he was a very heavy smoker, sometimes smoking as many as 60 cigarettes a day. Finally, on 1 January 1970, he stopped and never smoked again. He was a good dresser and enjoyed red wine and beer.

== Works ==
Kaluznin's research spread wide most notably in group theory and abstract groups. He worked on the Sylow p-subgroups of symmetric groups and mathematical linguistics. Despite not being able to go to many conferences he contributed to the application of computers in algebra. The universal embedding theorem is sometimes called the "Krasner-Kaloujnine universal embedding theorem" due to his joint proof of the theorem with Marc Krasner.
