= Tower of objects =

In category theory, a branch of abstract mathematics, a tower is defined as follows. Let $\mathcal I$ be the poset

$$\cdots\rightarrow 2\rightarrow 1\rightarrow 0$$

of whole numbers in reverse order, regarded as a category. A (countable) tower of objects in a category $\mathcal A$ is a functor from $\mathcal I$ to $\mathcal A$.

In other words, a tower (of $\mathcal A$) is a family of objects $\{A_i\}_{i\geq 0}$ in $\mathcal A$ where there exists a map

$A_i\rightarrow A_j$ if $i>j$

and the composition

$$A_i\rightarrow A_j\rightarrow A_k$$

is the map $A_i\rightarrow A_k$

== Example ==
Let $M_i=M$ for some $R$-module $M$. Let $M_i\rightarrow M_j$ be the identity map for $i>j$. Then $\{M_i\}$ forms a tower of modules.
