= Jean Delsarte =

French mathematician (1903–1968)

- Born: Jean Frédéric Auguste Delsarte; 19 October 1903; Fourmies, Nord, France
- Died: 28 November 1968 (aged 65); Nancy, France
- Known for: Introducing mean-periodic functions and generalised shift operators
- Scientific career
- Fields: Mathematics

Jean Frédéric Auguste Delsarte (19 October 1903, in Fourmies – 28 November 1968, in Nancy) was a French mathematician known for his work in mathematical analysis, in particular, for introducing mean-periodic functions and generalised shift operators. He was one of the founders of the Bourbaki group. He was an invited speaker at the International Congress of Mathematicians in 1932 at Zürich.

== Selected publications ==
- "Les groupes de transformations linéaires dans l'espace del Hilbert" (PDF). Mémorial des sciences mathématiques. fascicule 57: 1–59. 1932.
- Application de la théorie des fonctions moyenne-périodiques à la résolution de certaines équations intégrales (1934)
- Application de la théorie des fonctions moyenne-périodiques à la résolution des équations de Fredholm-Nörlund (1935)
- "Les fonctions moyenne-périodiques". J. Math. Pures Appl. 14 (1): 935. 1935.
- Fonctions moyenne-périodiques sur un groupe abstrait (1937)
- Delsarte, J. (1938). "Une extension nouvelle de la théorie des fonctions presque-périodiques de Bohr". Acta Math. 69: 259–317. doi:10.1007/bf02547715.
- "Sur certaines transformations fonctionelles relatives aux équations linéaires aux derivées partielles du second ordre" (PDF). C. R. Acad. Sci. Paris. 206 (1): 178–182. 1938.
- "Nombre de solutions des équations polynomiales sur un corps fini" (PDF). Séminaire Bourbaki. 1 (39): 321–329. 1951.
- "Hypergroupes et operateurs de permutation et de transmutation". Colloques Internat., Nancy: 29–44. 1956.
- "Note sur une propriété nouvelle des fonctions harmoniques". Comptes Rendus de l'Académie des Sciences, Série A. 246 (9): 1358–1360. 1958.
- Delsarte, J. (1960). "Théorie des fonctions moyenne-périodiques de deux variables". Annals of Mathematics. 72 (1): 121–178. doi:10.2307/1970149. JSTOR 1970149.
- Lectures on Topics in Mean Periodic functions and the Two Radius Theorem (PDF). Bombay: Tata Institute. 1961.
