= Malgrange preparation theorem =

Theorem about smooth complex functions

In mathematics, the Malgrange preparation theorem is an analogue of the Weierstrass preparation theorem for smooth functions. It was conjectured by René Thom and proved by B. Malgrange (1962–1963, 1964, 1967).

== Statement of Malgrange preparation theorem ==
Suppose that f(t,x) is a smooth complex function of t∈R and x∈R^{n} near the origin, and let k be the smallest integer such that

$$f(0,0)=0, {\partial f\over \partial t}(0,0)=0, \dots, {\partial^{k-1} f\over \partial t^{k-1}}(0,0)=0, {\partial^{k} f\over \partial t^{k}}(0,0)\ne0.$$

Then one form of the preparation theorem states that near the origin f can be written as the product of a smooth function c that is nonzero at the origin and a smooth function that as a function of t is a polynomial of degree k. In other words,

$$f(t,x) = c(t,x)\left(t^k+a_{k-1}(x)t^{k-1}+\cdots+a_0(x) \right)$$

where the functions c and a are smooth and c is nonzero at the origin.

A second form of the theorem, occasionally called the Mather division theorem, is a sort of "division with remainder" theorem: it says that if f and k satisfy the conditions above and g is a smooth function near the origin, then we can write

$$g=qf+r$$

where q and r are smooth, and as a function of t, r is a polynomial of degree less than k. This means that

$$r(x)=\sum_{0\le j<k}t^jr_j(x)$$

for some smooth functions r_{j}(x).

The two forms of the theorem easily imply each other: the first form is the special case of the "division with remainder" form where g is t^{k}, and the division with remainder form follows from the first form of the theorem as we may assume that f as a function of t is a polynomial of degree k.

If the functions f and g are real, then the functions c, a, q, and r can also be taken to be real. In the case of the Weierstrass preparation theorem these functions are uniquely determined by f and g, but uniqueness no longer holds for the Malgrange preparation theorem.

== Proof of Malgrange preparation theorem ==
The Malgrange preparation theorem can be deduced from the Weierstrass preparation theorem. The obvious way of doing this does not work: although smooth functions have a formal power series expansion at the origin, and the Weierstrass preparation theorem applies to formal power series, the formal power series will not usually converge to smooth functions near the origin. Instead one can use the idea of decomposing a smooth function as a sum of analytic functions by applying a partition of unity to its Fourier transform. For a proof along these lines see (Mather 1968) or (Hörmander 1983a, section 7.5)

== Algebraic version of the Malgrange preparation theorem ==
The Malgrange preparation theorem can be restated as a theorem about modules over rings of smooth, real-valued germs. If X is a manifold, with p∈X, let C^{∞}_{p}(X) denote the ring of real-valued germs of smooth functions at p on X. Let M_{p}(X) denote the unique maximal ideal of C^{∞}_{p}(X), consisting of germs which vanish at p. Let A be a C^{∞}_{p}(X)-module, and let f:X → Y be a smooth function between manifolds. Let q = f(p). f induces a ring homomorphism f^{*}:C^{∞}_{q}(Y) → C^{∞}_{p}(X) by composition on the right with f. Thus we can view A as a C^{∞}_{q}(Y)-module. Then the Malgrange preparation theorem says that if A is a finitely-generated C^{∞}_{p}(X)-module, then A is a finitely-generated C^{∞}_{q}(Y)-module if and only if A/M_{q}(Y)A is a finite-dimensional real vector space.
