= Krasner's lemma =

Relates the topology of a complete non-archimedean field to its algebraic extensions

In number theory, more specifically in p-adic analysis, Krasner's lemma is a basic result relating the topology of a complete non-archimedean field to its algebraic extensions.

== Statement ==
Let K be a complete non-archimedean field and let K̅ be a separable closure of K. Given an element α in K̅, denote its Galois conjugates by α_{2}, ..., α_{n}. Krasner's lemma states:

if an element β of K̅ is such that

$$\left|\alpha-\beta\right|<\left|\alpha-\alpha_i\right|\text{ for }i=2,\dots,n$$

then K(α) ⊆ K(β).

== Applications ==
Krasner's lemma can be used to show that $\mathfrak{p}$-adic completion and separable closure of global fields commute. In other words, given $\mathfrak{p}$ a prime of a global field L, the separable closure of the $\mathfrak{p}$-adic completion of L equals the $\overline{\mathfrak{p}}$-adic completion of the separable closure of L (where $\overline{\mathfrak{p}}$ is a prime of L̅ above $\mathfrak{p}$).

Another application is to proving that C_{p}—the completion of the algebraic closure of Q_{p}—is algebraically closed.

== Generalization ==
Krasner's lemma has the following generalization. Consider a monic polynomial
$$f^*=\prod_{k=1}^n(X-\alpha_k^*)$$
of degree n > 1 with coefficients in a Henselian field (K, v) and roots in the algebraic closure K̅. Let I and J be two disjoint, non-empty sets with union {1,...,n}. Moreover, consider a polynomial
$$g=\prod_{i\in I}(X-\alpha_i)$$
with coefficients and roots in K̅. Assume
$$\forall i\in I\forall j\in J: v(\alpha_i-\alpha_i^*)>v(\alpha_i^*-\alpha_j^*).$$
Then the coefficients of the polynomials
$$g^*:=\prod_{i\in I}(X-\alpha_i^*),\ h^*:=\prod_{j\in J}(X-\alpha_j^*)$$
are contained in the field extension of K generated by the coefficients of g. (The original Krasner's lemma corresponds to the situation where g has degree 1.)
