= Pierre Samuel =

French mathematician (1921–2009)

- Born: 12 September 1921; Paris
- Died: 23 August 2009 (aged 87); Paris
- Education: Princeton University
- Known for: Adequate equivalence relation Ramanujam–Samuel theorem Hilbert–Samuel function
- Awards: ICM Spesker (1958); Lester R. Ford Award (1969)
- Scientific career
- Fields: Mathematics
- Workplaces: University of Paris
- Doctoral advisor: Oscar Zariski
- Doctoral students: Daniel Lazard; Artibano Micali; Christian Peskine; Lucien Szpiro

Pierre Samuel (12 September 1921 – 23 August 2009) was a French mathematician, known for his work in commutative algebra and its applications to algebraic geometry. The two-volume work Commutative Algebra that he wrote with Oscar Zariski is a classic. Other books of his covered projective geometry and algebraic number theory.

== Early life and education ==
Samuel studied at the Lycée Janson-de-Sailly in Paris before attending the École Normale Supérieure where he studied for his Agrégé de mathematique. He received his Master of Arts and then a Ph.D. from Princeton University in 1947, under the supervision of Oscar Zariski, with a thesis "Ultrafilters and Compactification of Uniform Spaces".

== Career ==
Samuel ran a Paris seminar during the 1960s, and became Professeur émérite at the Université Paris-Sud (Orsay). His lectures on unique factorization domains published by the Tata Institute of Fundamental Research played a significant role in computing the Picard group of a Zariski surface via the work of Jeffrey Lang and collaborators. The method was inspired by earlier work of Nathan Jacobson and Pierre Cartier, another outstanding member of the Bourbaki group. Nicholas Katz related this to the concept of p-curvature of a connection introduced by Alexander Grothendieck.

He was a member of the Bourbaki group, and filmed some of their meetings. A French television documentary on Bourbaki broadcast some of this footage in 2000.

Samuel was also active in issues of social justice, including concerns about environmental degradation (where he was influenced by Grothendieck), and arms control. He died in Paris in August 2009.

His doctoral students include Lucien Szpiro and Daniel Lazard.

== Awards and honors ==
In 1958 he was an invited speaker (Relations d'équivalence en géométrie algébrique) at the ICM in Edinburgh. In 1969 he won the Lester R. Ford Award.

== Works ==
- Algèbre locale, Mémorial des Sciences Mathématiques, vol. 123, Paris: Gauthier-Villars, 1953
- Méthodes d'algèbre abstraite en géométrie algébrique, Berlin: Springer, 1955
- with Oscar Zariski: Commutative algebra I, Graduate Texts in Mathematics, vol. 28, Berlin, New York: Springer-Verlag, 1975 [1958], ISBN 978-0-387-90089-6, MR 0090581
- with Oscar Zariski: Commutative algebra. Vol. II, Berlin, New York: Springer-Verlag, 1975 [1960], ISBN 978-0-387-90171-8, MR 0389876
- Anneaux factoriels, Publicaçoes da Sociedade de Matematica de São Paulo, 1962
- Théorie algébrique des nombres. Hermann. 1967. ISBN 2-7056-5589-1.
  - Algebraic Theory of Numbers (English translation by Allan Silberger), Paris: Hermann & Boston: Houghton Mifflin Co., 1970, republished by Dover, 2008.
- Écologie: détente ou cycle infernal, Union générale d'éditions, Collection 10-18, 1973
- Amazones, guerrières et gaillardes, éditions Complexe & Presses universitaires de Grenoble, 1975
- Le nucléaire en question, 1980
- Géométrie projective, Presses universitaires de France, 1986
  - Projective Geometry (English translation by Silvio Levy), Undergraduate Texts in Mathematics, Springer-Verlag, 1988.
- Colloque en l'honneur de Pierre Samuel, Mém. Société mathématique de France (1989)
