= Luc Gauthier =

Canadian ice hockey player

- Born: April 19, 1964 (age 60); Longueuil, Quebec, Canada
- Height: 5 ft 9 in (175 cm)
- Weight: 195 lb (88 kg; 13 st 13 lb)
- Position: Defence
- Shot: Right
- Played for: Montreal Canadiens
- NHL draft: Undrafted
- Playing career: 1985–1997

Joseph Marcel Luc Gauthier (born April 19, 1964) is a Canadian professional ice hockey scout and former player. He was born in Longueuil, Quebec. As a youth, he played in the 1975 and 1977 Quebec International Pee-Wee Hockey Tournaments with a minor ice hockey team from Longueuil. Gauthier played three games in the National Hockey League for the Montreal Canadiens during the 1990–91 season, and played most of his career, from 1985 to 1997, in the minor professional leagues.

== Career statistics ==
=== Regular season and playoffs ===
			Regular season					Playoffs
Season	Team	League	GP	G	A	Pts	PIM	GP	G	A	Pts	PIM
1979–80	Mauricie Élans	QMAAA	13	0	1	1	8	2	0	0	0	0
1980–81	Richelieu Éclaireurs	QMAAA	48	4	14	18	65	12	2	6	8	14
1982–83	Longueuil Chevaliers	QMJHL	67	3	18	21	132	15	0	4	4	35
1983–84	Longueuil Chevaliers	QMJHL	70	8	54	62	207	17	4	9	13	24
1984–85	Longueuil Chevaliers	QMJHL	60	13	47	60	111	—	—	—	—	—
1984–85	Flint Generals	IHL	21	1	0	1	20	—	—	—	—	—
1985–86	Saginaw Generals	IHL	66	9	29	38	160	—	—	—	—	—
1986–87	Sherbrooke Canadiens	AHL	78	5	17	22	8	17	2	4	6	31
1987–88	Sherbrooke Canadiens	AHL	61	4	10	14	105	6	0	0	0	18
1988–89	Sherbrooke Canadiens	AHL	77	8	20	28	178	6	0	0	0	10
1989–90	Sherbrooke Canadiens	AHL	79	3	23	26	139	12	0	4	4	35
1990–91	Montreal Canadiens	NHL	3	0	0	0	2	—	—	—	—	—
1990–91	Fredericton Canadiens	AHL	69	7	20	27	238	9	1	1	2	10
1991–92	Fredericton Canadiens	AHL	80	4	14	18	252	7	1	1	2	26
1992–93	Fredericton Canadiens	AHL	78	9	33	42	167	5	2	1	3	20
1996–97	Fredericton Canadiens	AHL	2	0	0	0	0	—	—	—	—	—
AHL totals			524	40	137	177	1087	62	6	11	17	150
NHL totals			3	0	0	0	2	—	—	—	—	—
