= Sphere theorem (3-manifolds) =

On when elements of the 2nd homotopy group of a 3-manifold can be embedded spheres

In mathematics, in the topology of 3-manifolds, the sphere theorem of Christos Papakyriakopoulos (1957) gives conditions for elements of the second homotopy group of a 3-manifold to be represented by embedded spheres.

One example is the following:

Let $M$ be an orientable 3-manifold such that $\pi_2(M)$ is not the trivial group. Then there exists a non-zero element of $\pi_2(M)$ having a representative that is an embedding $S^2\to M$. This statement may be strengthened to show that the embedding is piecewise linear (Lickorish 1997, p. 133).

The proof of this version of the theorem can be based on transversality methods, see Jean-Loïc Batude (1971).

Another more general version (also called the projective plane theorem, and due to David B. A. Epstein) is:

Let $M$ be any 3-manifold and $N$ a $\pi_1(M)$-invariant subgroup of $\pi_2(M)$. If $f\colon S^2\to M$ is a general position map such that $[f]\notin N$ and $U$ is any neighborhood of the singular set $\Sigma(f)$, then there is a map $g\colon S^2\to M$ satisfying

1. $[g]\notin N$,
2. $g(S^2)\subset f(S^2)\cup U$,
3. $g\colon S^2\to g(S^2)$ is a covering map, and
4. $g(S^2)$ is a 2-sided submanifold (2-sphere or projective plane) of $M$.

quoted in (Hempel 1976, p. 54).
