= Bernard Malgrange =

French mathematician (1928–2024)

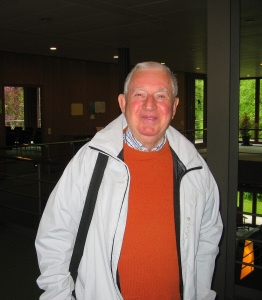
- Malgrange in 2007
- Born: 6 July 1928; Paris, France
- Died: 5 January 2024 (aged 95); Grenoble
- Education: Université Henri Poincaré
- Known for: Ehrenpreis–Malgrange theorem Malgrange preparation theorem
- Scientific career
- Fields: Mathematics
- Doctoral advisor: Laurent Schwartz
- Doctoral students: M. Salah Baouendi

Bernard Malgrange (6 July 1928 – 5 January 2024) was a French mathematician who worked on differential equations and singularity theory. He proved the Ehrenpreis–Malgrange theorem and the Malgrange preparation theorem, essential for the classification theorem of the elementary catastrophes of René Thom. He received his Ph.D. from Université Henri Poincaré (Nancy 1) in 1955. His advisor was Laurent Schwartz. He was elected to the Académie des sciences in 1988. In 2012 he gave the Łojasiewicz Lecture (on "Differential algebraic groups") at the Jagiellonian University in Kraków. Malgrange died on 5 January 2024, at the age of 95.

== Publications ==
- Ideals of differentiable functions (Oxford University Press, 1966)
- Équations différentielles à coefficients polynomiaux, Progress in Mathematics (Birkhäuser, 1991).

== See also ==
- Malgrange–Zerner theorem
