= Marc Krasner =

French mathematician (1912–1985)

Marc Krasner (1912 – 13 May 1985, in Paris) was a Russian-born French mathematician, who worked on algebraic number theory.

== Biography ==
Krasner emigrated from the Soviet Union to France and received in 1935 his PhD from the University of Paris under Jacques Hadamard with thesis Sur la théorie de la ramification des idéaux de corps non-galoisiens de nombres algébriques. From 1937 to 1960 he was a scientist at CNRS and from 1960 professor at the University of Clermont-Ferrand. From 1965 he was a professor at the University of Paris VI (Pierre et Marie Curie), where he retired in 1980 as professor emeritus.

Krasner did research on p-adic analysis. In 1944 he introduced the concept of ultrametric spaces, to which p-adic numbers belong. In 1951, alongside Lev Kaluznin, he proved the Krasner-Kaloujnine universal embedding theorem, which states that every extension of one group by another is isomorphic to a subgroup of the wreath product. A well-known Krasner's theorem, everywhere known as Krasner's lemma, relies the topological structure and the algebraic structure of vector spaces over local fields.

In 1958 he received the Prix Paul Doistau–Émile Blutet of the Académie des Sciences.

== Publications ==
- Théorie des corps valués. Année 1953/1954. Vol. III, Exposé 6 à 19. Paris: Secrétariat mathématique. 1956.
- Les tendances géométriques en algèbre et théorie des nombres. Paris: CNRS. 1966.
- with Mirjana Vuković: Structures paragraduées (groupes, anneaux, modules). Kingston, Ontario: Queen's University Press. 1987.
