= Pierre Cartier (mathematician) =

French mathematician (1932–2024)

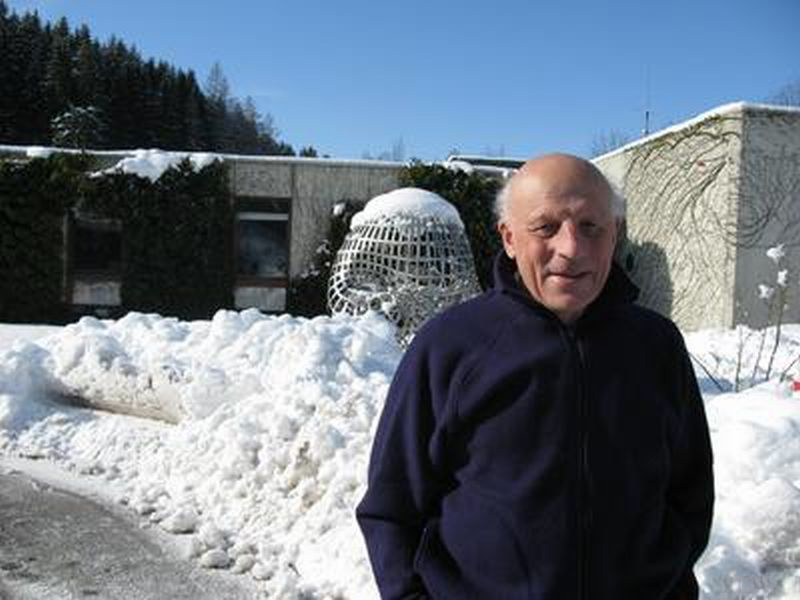
- Cartier in 2009
- Born: Pierre Émile Cartier; 10 June 1932; Sedan, France
- Died: 17 August 2024 (aged 92); Marcoussis, France
- Education: Lycée Saint-Louis
- Alma mater: École normale supérieure University of Paris
- Known for: Cartier divisor Cartier duality Cartier isomorphism Cartier operator Cartier's theorem Cartier–Foata matrices Traces
- Awards: Prix Peccot (1960); ICM Speaker (1970); Prize Ampère (1978)
- Scientific career
- Fields: Mathematics
- Institutions: University of Strasbourg; Institut des Hautes Études Scientifiques
- Doctoral advisor: Henri Cartan; André Weil
- Doctoral students: Guy Henniart

Pierre Émile Cartier (10 June 1932 – 17 August 2024) was a French mathematician. An associate of the Bourbaki group and at one time a colleague of Alexander Grothendieck, his interests have ranged over algebraic geometry, representation theory, mathematical physics, and category theory.

== Life and career ==
Cartier was born on 10 June 1932. He studied at the École Normale Supérieure in Paris under Henri Cartan and André Weil. After his 1958 thesis on algebraic geometry, he worked in a number of fields. He is known for the introduction of the Cartier operator in algebraic geometry in characteristic p, and for work on duality of abelian varieties and on formal groups. He is the eponym of Cartier divisors and Cartier duality.

From 1961 to 1971, he was a professor at the University of Strasbourg. In 1970 he was an Invited Speaker at the International Congress of Mathematicians in Nice. He was awarded the 1978 Prize Ampère of the French Academy of Sciences. In 2012 he became a fellow of the American Mathematical Society.

Cartier died in Marcoussis on 17 August 2024, at the age of 92.

== Publications ==
- Cartier, Pierre; Foata, Dominique (14 November 2006). Problèmes combinatoires de commutation et réarrangements. Springer. ISBN 9783540360940. (1st edition 1969)
- Waldschmidt, Michel; Moussa, Pierre; Luck, Jean-Marc; Itzykson, Claude, eds. (9 March 2013). "An introduction to zeta functions by Pierre Cartier". From Number Theory to Physics. Springer. pp. 1–63. ISBN 9783662028384. (1st edition 1992)
- "A primer of Hopf algebras" (PDF). Report Number IHES-M-2006-40: 1–74. September 2006.
- Freedom in Mathematics, Springer India, 2016 (with Cédric Villani, Jean Dhombres, Gerhard Heinzmann), ISBN 978-81-322-2786-1.
  - Translation from the French language edition: Mathématiques en liberté, La Ville Brûle, Montreuil 2012, ISBN 978-23-601-2026-0.
- Pierre Cartier: Alexander Grothendieck. A country known only by name. Notices AMS, vol. 62, 2015, no. 4, pp. 373–382, PDF.

=== As editor ===
- Cartier, Pierre; Illusie, Luc; Katz, Nicholas M.; Laumon, Gérard; Manin, Yuri I.; Ribet, Kenneth A., eds. (23 October 2007). The Grothendieck Festschrift, Volume III: A Collection of Articles Written in Honor of the 60th Birthday of Alexander Grothendieck. Springer. ISBN 9780817645762. (1st edition 1990)
- Cartier, Pierre É.; Julia, Bernard; Moussa, Pierre; Vanhove, Pierre, eds. (18 July 2007). Frontiers in Number Theory, Physics, and Geometry II: On Conformal Field Theories, Discrete Groups and Renormalization. Springer. ISBN 9783540303084.

== See also ==
- Cotangent complex
- Dieudonné module
- MacMahon's master theorem
