= Roger Godement =

French mathematician (1921–2016)

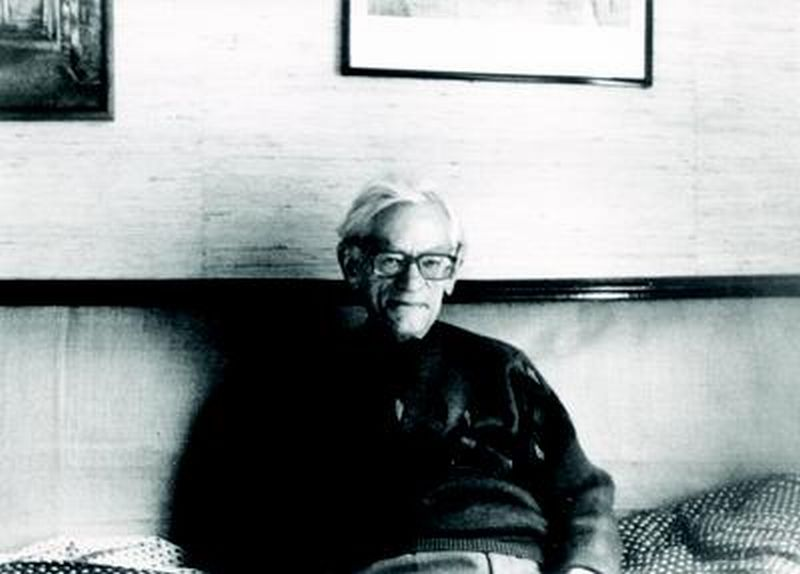
- Born: 1 October 1921; Le Havre
- Died: 21 July 2016 (aged 94)
- Education: École Normale Supérieure
- Known for: Godement compactness condition Godement resolution Bochner–Godement theorem Monad; Zonal spherical function
- Awards: Peccot Lecture (1951-1952)
- Scientific career
- Fields: Mathematics
- Workplaces: Paris Diderot University
- Doctoral advisor: Henri Cartan
- Doctoral students: Hervé Jacquet; Christophe Soulé

Roger Godement (French: [ɡɔdmɑ̃]; 1 October 1921 – 21 July 2016) was a French mathematician, known for his work in functional analysis as well as his expository books.

== Biography ==
Godement started as a student at the École normale supérieure in 1940, where he became a student of Henri Cartan. He started research into harmonic analysis on locally compact abelian groups, finding a number of major results; this work was in parallel but independent of similar investigations in the USSR and Japan. Work on the abstract theory of spherical functions published in 1952 proved very influential in subsequent work, particularly that of Harish-Chandra. The isolation of the concept of square-integrable representation is attributed to him. The Godement compactness criterion in the theory of arithmetic groups was a conjecture of his. He later worked with Jacquet on the zeta function of a simple algebra.

He was an active member of the Bourbaki group in the early 1950s, and subsequently gave a number of significant Bourbaki seminars. He also took part in the Cartan seminar.

His book Topologie Algébrique et Théorie des Faisceaux from 1958 was, as he said, a very unoriginal idea for the time (that is, to write an exposition of sheaf theory); as a non-specialist, he managed to write an enduring classic. It introduced the technical method of flasque resolutions, nowadays called Godement resolutions. It has also been credited as the place in which a comonad can first be discerned.

He also wrote texts on Lie groups, abstract algebra and mathematical analysis.

== Selected publications ==
- Godement, Roger (1952). "A theory of spherical functions. I". Transactions of the American Mathematical Society. 73 (3): 496–556. doi:10.2307/1990805. JSTOR 1990805. MR 0052444.
- Topologie algébrique et théorie des faisceaux. Hermann 1958, 1960.
- Cours d´algèbre. Hermann 1963, 1966.
- Algebra. Hermann 1968.
- Godement, R. (1970), Notes on Jacquet–Langlands' theory, Institute for Advanced Study
- Godement, Roger; Jacquet, Hervé (1972). Zeta functions of simple algebras. Lecture Notes in Mathematics. Vol. 260. Berlin-New York: Springer-Verlag. MR 0342495.
- Analyse mathématique. 4 vols., Springer-Verlag 1998–2001.

== See also ==
- Commutation theorem for traces
- Plancherel theorem for spherical functions
- Standard L-function
