= Bruhat =

Bruhat is a surname. Notable people with the surname include:

- Georges Bruhat (1887–1945), French physicist, father of Yvonne and François
- Yvonne Choquet-Bruhat (née Bruhat, 1923–2025), French mathematician and physicist
- François Bruhat (1929–2007), French mathematician
