= Choquet =

Choquet is a French surname. Notable people with the surname include:

- Antoine Choquet de Lindu (1712–1790), French architect and military engineer
- Daniel Choquet (born 1962), French neuroscientist
- François-Hyacinthe Choquet (ca. 1580–1645), Dominican hagiographer and spiritual author in the Spanish Netherlands
- Gustave Choquet (1915–2006), French mathematician
- Yvonne Choquet-Bruhat (1923–2025), French mathematician and physicist

== See also ==
- Choquet integral, a way of measuring the expected utility of an uncertain event
- Choquet theory states that for a compact convex subset C in a normed space V, any c in C is the barycentre of a probability measure supported on the set E of extreme points of C
