= Laurent Schwartz =

French mathematician (1915–2002)

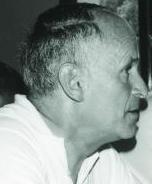
- Born: 5 March 1915; Paris, France
- Died: 4 July 2002 (aged 87); Paris, France
- Education: École Normale Supérieure
- Known for: Theory of Distributions; Schwartz kernel theorem Schwartz space Schwartz–Bruhat function Radonifying operator Cylinder set measure
- Awards: Fields Medal (1950)
- Scientific career
- Fields: Mathematics
- Workplaces: University of Strasbourg; University of Nancy; University of Grenoble; École Polytechnique; Université de Paris VII
- Doctoral advisor: Georges Valiron
- Doctoral students: Maurice Audin; Georges Glaeser; Alexander Grothendieck; Jacques-Louis Lions; Bernard Malgrange; André Martineau; Bernard Maurey; Leopoldo Nachbin; Henri Hogbe Nlend; Gilles Pisier; François Treves

Laurent-Moïse Schwartz (French: [lɔʁɑ̃ mɔiz ʃvaʁts]; 5 March 1915 – 4 July 2002) was a French mathematician who received the Fields Medal in 1950 for pioneering the theory of distributions or generalized functions, giving a well-defined meaning to objects such as the Dirac delta function. For several years he taught at the École polytechnique.

== Family ==
Laurent Schwartz came from a Jewish family of Alsatian origin, with a strong scientific background: his father was a well-known surgeon, his uncle Robert Debré (who contributed to the creation of UNICEF) was a famous pediatrician, and his great-uncle-in-law, Jacques Hadamard, was a famous mathematician.

During his training at Lycée Louis-le-Grand to enter the École Normale Supérieure, he fell in love with mathematician Marie-Hélène Lévy, daughter of the probabilist Paul Lévy who was then teaching at the École polytechnique. They married in 1938. Later they had two children, Marc-André and Claudine Robert, who became a professor of statistics at the University of Grenoble. Marie-Hélène was gifted in mathematics as well, contributing to the development of geometry of singular analytic spaces. She also taught at the University of Lille.

Angelo Guerraggio describes "Mathematics, politics and butterflies" as Schwartz's "three great loves".

== Education ==
According to his teachers, Schwartz was an exceptional student. He was particularly gifted in Latin, Greek and mathematics. One of his teachers told his parents: "Beware, some will say your son has a gift for languages, but he is only interested in the scientific and mathematical aspect of languages: he should become a mathematician."

In 1934, he was admitted at the École Normale Supérieure, and in 1937 he obtained the agrégation (with rank 2).

== World War II ==
As a man of Trotskyist affinities and Jewish descent, life was difficult for Schwartz during World War II. He had to hide and change his identity to avoid being deported after Nazi Germany overran France. He worked for the University of Strasbourg (which had been relocated to Clermont-Ferrand because of the war) under the name of Laurent-Marie Sélimartin (his thesis "Étude des sommes d'exponentielles réelles" being however published in 1943 under his real name in the Publications de l'Institut de Mathématique de l'Université de Clermont-Ferrand, volume 959 of Hermann's Actualités scientifiques et industrielles), while Marie-Hélène used the name Lengé instead of Lévy. Unlike other mathematicians at Clermont-Ferrand such as Feldbau, the couple managed to escape the Nazis.'

== Later career ==
Schwartz taught mainly at École Polytechnique, from 1958 to 1980. At the end of the war, he spent one year in Grenoble (1944), then in 1945 joined the University of Nancy on the advice of Jean Delsarte and Jean Dieudonné, where he spent seven years. He was both an influential researcher and teacher, with students such as Bernard Malgrange, Jacques-Louis Lions, François Bruhat and Alexander Grothendieck. He joined the science faculty of the University of Paris in 1952. In 1958 he became a teacher at the École polytechnique after having at first refused this position. From 1961 to 1963 the École polytechnique suspended his right to teach, because of his having signed the Manifesto of the 121 about the Algerian war, a gesture not appreciated by Polytechnique's military administration. However, Schwartz had a lasting influence on mathematics at the École polytechnique, having reorganized both teaching and research there. In 1965 he established the Centre de mathématiques Laurent-Schwartz (CMLS) as its first director.

In 1973 he was elected corresponding member of the French Academy of Sciences, and was promoted to full membership in 1975.

== Mathematical legacy ==
At the 1950 International Congress of Mathematicians in Cambridge (Massachusetts), Schwartz was a plenary speaker and was awarded the Fields Medal for his work on distributions. He was the first French mathematician to receive the Fields medal. Because of his sympathy for Trotskyism, Schwartz encountered serious problems trying to enter the United States to receive the medal; however, he was ultimately successful.

The theory of distributions clarified the (then) mysteries of the Dirac delta function and Heaviside step function. It helps to extend the theory of Fourier transforms and is now of critical importance to the theory of partial differential equations.

== Popular science ==
Throughout his life, Schwartz actively worked to promote science and bring it closer to the general audience. Schwartz said: "What are mathematics helpful for? Mathematics are helpful for physics. Physics helps us make fridges. Fridges are made to contain spiny lobsters, and spiny lobsters help mathematicians who eat them and have hence better abilities to do mathematics, which are helpful for physics, which helps us make fridges which..."

== Entomology ==
His mother, who was passionate about natural science, passed on her taste for entomology to Laurent. His personal collection of 20,000 Lepidoptera specimens, collected during his various travels, was bequeathed to the Muséum national d'histoire naturelle, the Science Museum of Lyon, the Museum of Toulouse and the Museo de Historia Natural Alcide d'Orbigny in Cochabamba (Bolivia). Several species discovered by Schwartz bear his name.

== Personal ideology ==
Apart from his scientific work, Schwartz was a well-known outspoken intellectual. As a young socialist influenced by Leon Trotsky, Schwartz opposed the totalitarianism of the Soviet Union, particularly under Joseph Stalin. Schwartz broke with Trotskyism in 1947 and wrote that his "political culture comes almost entirely from that Trotskyist period".

On his religious views, Schwartz called himself an atheist.

== Books ==
Research articles

- Œuvres scientifiques. I. With a general introduction to the works of Schwartz by Claude Viterbo and an appreciation of Schwartz by Bernard Malgrange. With 1 DVD. Documents Mathématiques (Paris), 9. Société Mathématique de France, Paris, 2011. x+523 pp. ISBN 978-2-85629-317-1

the first half of his works in analysis and partial differential equations. After a preface by Claude Viterbo, which includes a few photos, one will find a note by Schwartz himself about his works, followed by a few original documents (letters, course notes), a presentation by Bernard Malgrange of the theory of distributions for which Schwartz received the Fields Medal in 1950, and a selection of articles covering the period 1944–1954.

- Œuvres scientifiques. II. With an appreciation of Schwartz by Alain Guichardet. With 1 DVD. Documents Mathématiques (Paris), 10. Société Mathématique de France, Paris, 2011. x+507 pp. ISBN 978-2-85629-318-8

the second half of his works in analysis and partial differential equations. After a note by Alain Guichardet on Schwartz and his seminars, one will find a selection of articles covering the period 1954–1966.

- Œuvres scientifiques. III. With appreciations of Schwartz by Gilles Godefroy and Michel Émery. With 1 DVD. Documents Mathématiques (Paris), 11. Société Mathématique de France, Paris, 2011. x+619 pp. ISBN 978-2-85629-319-5

his works on Banach space theory (1968–1987), introduced by Gilles Godefroy, and on probability theory (1970–1996), presented by Michel Émery, as well as some articles of a historical nature (1955–1994).

Technical books

- Analyse hilbertienne. Collection Méthodes. Hermann, Paris, 1979. ii+297 pp. ISBN 2-7056-5897-1
- Application of distributions to the theory of elementary particles in quantum mechanics. Gordon and Breach, New York, NY, 1968. 144pp. ISBN 978-0-677-30090-0
- Cours d'analyse. 1. Second edition. Hermann, Paris, 1981. xxix+830 pp. ISBN 2-7056-5764-9
- Cours d'analyse. 2. Second edition. Hermann, Paris, 1981. xxiii+475+21+75 pp. ISBN 2-7056-5765-7
- Étude des sommes d'exponentielles. 2ième éd. Publications de l'Institut de Mathématique de l'Université de Strasbourg, V. Actualités Sci. Ind., Hermann, Paris 1959 151 pp.
- Geometry and probability in Banach spaces. Based on notes taken by Paul R. Chernoff. Lecture Notes in Mathematics, 852. Springer-Verlag, Berlin-New York, 1981. x+101 pp. ISBN 3-540-10691-X
- Lectures on complex analytic manifolds. With notes by M. S. Narasimhan. Reprint of the 1955 edition. Tata Institute of Fundamental Research Lectures on Mathematics and Physics, 4. Published for the Tata Institute of Fundamental Research, Bombay; by Springer-Verlag, Berlin, 1986. iv+182 pp. ISBN 3-540-12877-8
- Mathematics for the physical sciences. Hermann, Paris; Addison-Wesley Publishing Co., Reading, Mass.-London-Don Mills, Ont. 1966 358 pp.
- Radon measures on arbitrary topological spaces and cylindrical measures. Tata Institute of Fundamental Research Studies in Mathematics, No. 6. Published for the Tata Institute of Fundamental Research, Bombay by Oxford University Press, London, 1973. xii+393 pp.
- Semimartingales and their stochastic calculus on manifolds. Edited and with a preface by Ian Iscoe. Collection de la Chaire Aisenstadt. Presses de l'Université de Montréal, Montreal, QC, 1984. 187 pp. ISBN 2-7606-0660-0
- Semi-martingales sur des variétés, et martingales conformes sur des variétés analytiques complexes. Lecture Notes in Mathematics, 780. Springer, Berlin, 1980. xv+132 pp. ISBN 3-540-09749-X
- Les tenseurs. Suivi de "Torseurs sur un espace affine by Y. Bamberger and J.-P. Bourguignon. Second edition. Hermann, Paris, 1981. i+203 pp. ISBN 2-7056-1376-5
- Théorie des distributions. Publications de l'Institut de Mathématique de l'Université de Strasbourg, No. IX-X. Nouvelle édition, entiérement corrigée, refondue et augmentée. Hermann, Paris 1966 xiii+420 pp.

Seminar notes

- Séminaire Schwartz in Paris 1953 bis 1961. Online edition:

Popular books

- Pour sauver l'université. Editions du Seuil, 1983. 122 pp. ISBN 2-02-006587-8
- A mathematician grappling with his century. Translated from the 1997 French original by Leila Schneps. Birkhäuser Verlag, Basel, 2001. viii+490 pp. ISBN 3-7643-6052-6

== See also ==
- Schwartz distribution
- Schwartz kernel theorem
- Schwartz space
- Schwartz–Bruhat function
- Nicolas Bourbaki
