= Compactly generated =

In mathematics, compactly generated can refer to:

- Compactly generated group, a topological group which is algebraically generated by one of its compact subsets
- Compactly generated space, a topological space whose topology is coherent with the family of all compact subspaces
