= Chuquet =

Chuquet is a French surname. Notable people with the surname include:

- Arthur Chuquet (1853–1925), French historian and biographer
- Nicolas Chuquet (15th century), French mathematician

== See also ==
- Choquet
