= Schwartz–Bruhat function =

In mathematics, a Schwartz–Bruhat function, named after Laurent Schwartz and François Bruhat, is a complex valued function on a locally compact abelian group, such as the adeles, that generalizes a Schwartz function on a real vector space. A tempered distribution is defined as a continuous linear functional on the space of Schwartz–Bruhat functions.

== Definitions ==
- On a real vector space $\mathbb{R}^n$, the Schwartz–Bruhat functions are just the usual Schwartz functions (all derivatives rapidly decreasing) and form the space $\mathcal{S}(\mathbb{R}^n)$.
- On a torus, the Schwartz–Bruhat functions are the smooth functions.
- On a sum of copies of the integers, the Schwartz–Bruhat functions are the rapidly decreasing functions.
- On an elementary group (i.e., an abelian locally compact group that is a product of copies of the reals, the integers, the circle group, and finite groups), the Schwartz–Bruhat functions are the smooth functions all of whose derivatives are rapidly decreasing.
- On a general locally compact abelian group $G$, let $A$ be a compactly generated subgroup, and $B$ a compact subgroup of $A$ such that $A/B$ is elementary. Then the pullback of a Schwartz–Bruhat function on $A/B$ is a Schwartz–Bruhat function on $G$, and all Schwartz–Bruhat functions on $G$ are obtained like this for suitable $A$ and $B$. (The space of Schwartz–Bruhat functions on $G$ is endowed with the inductive limit topology.)
- On a non-archimedean local field $K$, a Schwartz–Bruhat function is a locally constant function of compact support.
- In particular, on the ring of adeles $\mathbb{A}_K$ over a global field $K$, the Schwartz–Bruhat functions $f$ are finite linear combinations of the products $\prod_v f_v$ over each place $v$ of $K$, where each $f_v$ is a Schwartz–Bruhat function on a local field $K_v$ and $f_v = \mathbf{1}_{\mathcal{O}_v}$ is the characteristic function on the ring of integers $\mathcal{O}_v$ for all but finitely many $v$. (For the archimedean places of $K$, the $f_v$ are just the usual Schwartz functions on $\mathbb{R}^n$, while for the non-archimedean places the $f_v$ are the Schwartz–Bruhat functions of non-archimedean local fields.)
- The space of Schwartz–Bruhat functions on the adeles $\mathbb{A}_K$ is defined to be the restricted tensor product $\bigotimes_v'\mathcal{S}(K_v) := \varinjlim_{E}\left(\bigotimes_{v \in E}\mathcal{S}(K_v) \right)$ of Schwartz–Bruhat spaces $\mathcal{S}(K_v)$ of local fields, where $E$ is a finite set of places of $K$. The elements of this space are of the form $f = \otimes_vf_v$, where $f_v \in \mathcal{S}(K_v)$ for all $v$ and $f_v=1_{\mathcal{O}_v}$ for all but finitely many $v$. For each $x = (x_v)_v \in \mathbb{A}_K$ we can write $f(x) = \prod_vf_v(x_v)$, which is finite and thus is well defined.

== Examples ==
- Every Schwartz–Bruhat function $f \in \mathcal{S}(\mathbb{Q}_p)$ can be written as $f = \sum_{i = 1}^n c_i \mathbf{1}_{a_i + p^{k_i}\mathbb{Z}_p}$, where each $a_i \in \mathbb{Q}_p$, $k_i \in \mathbb{Z}$, and $c_i \in \mathbb{C}$. This can be seen by observing that $\mathbb{Q}_p$ being a local field implies that $f$ by definition has compact support, i.e., $\operatorname{supp}(f)$ has a finite subcover. Since every open set in $\mathbb{Q}_p$ can be expressed as a disjoint union of open balls of the form $a + p^k \mathbb{Z}_p$ (for some $a \in \mathbb{Q}_p$ and $k \in \mathbb{Z}$) we have

$\operatorname{supp}(f) = \coprod_{i = 1}^n (a_i + p^{k_i}\mathbb{Z}_p)$. The function $f$ must also be locally constant, so $f |_{a_i + p^{k_i}\mathbb{Z}_p} = c_i \mathbf{1}_{a_i + p^{k_i}\mathbb{Z}_p}$ for some $c_i \in \mathbb{C}$. (As for $f$ evaluated at zero, $f(0)\mathbf{1}_{\mathbb{Z}_p}$ is always included as a term.)

- On the rational adeles $\mathbb{A}_{\mathbb{Q}}$ all functions in the Schwartz–Bruhat space $\mathcal{S}(\mathbb{A}_{\mathbb{Q}})$ are finite linear combinations of $\prod_{p \le \infty} f_p = f_\infty \times \prod_{p < \infty } f_p$ over all rational primes $p$, where $f_\infty \in \mathcal{S}(\mathbb{R})$, $f_p \in \mathcal{S}(\mathbb{Q}_p)$, and $f_p = \mathbf{1}_{\mathbb{Z}_p}$ for all but finitely many $p$. The sets $\mathbb{Q}_p$ and $\mathbb{Z}_p$ are the field of p-adic numbers and ring of p-adic integers respectively.

== Properties ==
The Fourier transform of a Schwartz–Bruhat function on a locally compact abelian group is a Schwartz–Bruhat function on the Pontryagin dual group. Consequently, the Fourier transform takes tempered distributions on such a group to tempered distributions on the dual group. Given the (additive) Haar measure on $\mathbb{A}_K$ the Schwartz–Bruhat space $\mathcal{S}(\mathbb{A}_K)$ is dense in the space $L^2(\mathbb{A}_K, dx).$

== Fourier transform ==
Let $G$ be a locally compact abelian group and let $\widehat G$ denote its Pontryagin dual. After choosing compatible Haar measures on $G$ and $\widehat G$, the Fourier transform of an integrable function $f$ on $G$ is defined by
$$\widehat f(\chi)=\int_G f(x)\overline{\chi(x)}\,dx,
\qquad \chi\in \widehat G .$$
One of the basic properties of the Schwartz–Bruhat space is that the Fourier transform maps $S(G)$ isomorphically onto $S(\widehat G)$.

For a finite-dimensional vector space $V$ over a local field $F$, the Fourier transform is usually written with respect to a nontrivial additive character $\psi$ of $F$. If $V^*$ is the dual vector space, then
$$\widehat f(\xi)=\int_V f(x)\psi(\langle x,\xi\rangle)\,dx,\qquad \xi\in V^*.$$
The transform maps $S(V)$ onto $S(V^*)$. In the archimedean case this recovers the usual fact that the Fourier transform preserves the Schwartz space. In the non-archimedean case it says that the Fourier transform of a locally constant compactly supported function is again locally constant and compactly supported.

On the adele ring $\mathbf A_K$ of a global field $K$, the Fourier transform is obtained from the product of the local Fourier transforms. With the standard choice of additive character and self-dual Haar measure, it preserves the adelic Schwartz–Bruhat space $S(\mathbf A_K)$. This compatibility is used in the adelic Poisson summation formula and in Tate's thesis.

== Topology ==
The Schwartz–Bruhat space is not only a vector space of functions but also a locally convex topological vector space. In the real case this is the usual Fréchet topology on the Schwartz space, defined by the Schwartz seminorms. In the non-archimedean local-field case, the space is an inductive limit of finite-dimensional spaces of functions supported on a fixed compact open set and invariant under translation by a fixed compact open subgroup. The continuity condition in the definition of a tempered distribution refers to this locally convex topology.

With this locally convex topology, Schwartz–Bruhat spaces are nuclear spaces. In particular, the usual examples include the nuclear Fréchet spaces $S(\mathbf R^n)$, $C^\infty(\mathbf T^n)$, and the space of rapidly decreasing functions on $\mathbf Z^n$; in the non-archimedean local-field case, $S(K)$ is an inductive limit of finite-dimensional spaces.

== Tempered distributions ==
The continuous dual of a Schwartz–Bruhat space is the corresponding space of tempered distributions. Thus a tempered distribution on a locally compact abelian group $G$ is a continuous linear functional on $S(G)$. Since the Fourier transform is an isomorphism from $S(G)$ to $S(\widehat G)$, it extends by duality to an isomorphism between tempered distributions on $G$ and tempered distributions on $\widehat G$.

For a non-archimedean local field, the Schwartz–Bruhat space is the space of locally constant compactly supported functions. In this case the usual test functions for distributions and the Schwartz–Bruhat test functions coincide, so the distinction between distributions and tempered distributions is less pronounced than over $\mathbf R$.

== Applications ==
In algebraic number theory, the Schwartz–Bruhat functions on the adeles can be used to give an adelic version of the Poisson summation formula from analysis, i.e., for every $f \in \mathcal{S}(\mathbb{A}_K)$ one has $\sum_{x \in K} f(ax) = \frac{1}{|a|}\sum_{x \in K} \hat{f}(a^{-1}x)$, where $a \in \mathbb{A}_K^{\times}$. John Tate developed this formula in his doctoral thesis to prove a more general version of the functional equation for the Riemann zeta function. This involves giving the zeta function of a number field an integral representation in which the integral of a Schwartz–Bruhat function, chosen as a test function, is twisted by a certain character and is integrated over $\mathbb{A}_K^{\times}$ with respect to the multiplicative Haar measure of this group. This allows one to apply analytic methods to study zeta functions through these zeta integrals.
