= Programmable unijunction transistor =

Type of semiconductor

- Component type: Passive
- Inventor: General Electric
- Pin names: anode, gate and cathode

Electronic symbol
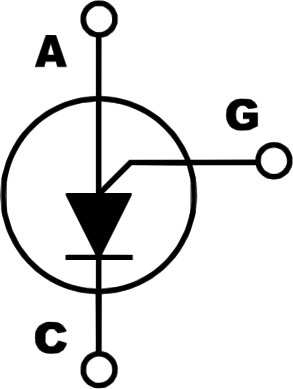

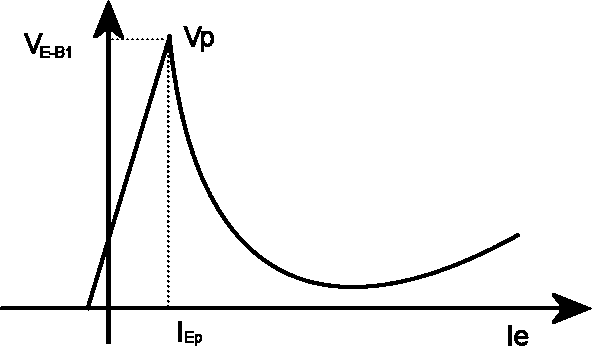
Graph of PUT characteristic curve, similar to UJT

A programmable unijunction transistor (PUT) is a three-lead electronic semiconductor device that is similar to a unijunction transistor (UJT), except that its behavior can be controlled using external components. In a UJT, the base region is divided into two parts by the emitter. The two parts of the base form a voltage divider, which sets the operating point of the UJT. That voltage divider can be programmed with two physical resistors connected to the gate terminal of the PUT. This allows the designer some control over the operating point of the PUT.

== Construction ==
In construction, the programmable transistor is similar to the silicon controlled rectifier (SCR). Like SCR, it consists of four layers ‒ PNPN ‒ but its gate is connected to the second layer (N-type), not the third one (P-type) as with SCR.

== Applications ==
Applications include:

- Triggering thyristors
- Relaxation oscillator
