= Multivibrator =

Electronic circuit used to implement two-state devices

A multivibrator is an electronic circuit used to implement a variety of simple two-state devices such as relaxation oscillators, timers, latches and flip-flops. The first multivibrator circuit, the astable multivibrator oscillator, was invented by Henri Abraham and Eugene Bloch during World War I. It consisted of two vacuum tube amplifiers cross-coupled by a resistor-capacitor network. They called their circuit a "multivibrator" because its output waveform was rich in harmonics. A variety of active devices can be used to implement multivibrators that produce similar harmonic-rich wave forms; these include transistors, neon lamps, tunnel diodes and others. Although cross-coupled devices are a common form, single-element multivibrator oscillators are also common.

The three types of multivibrator circuits are:

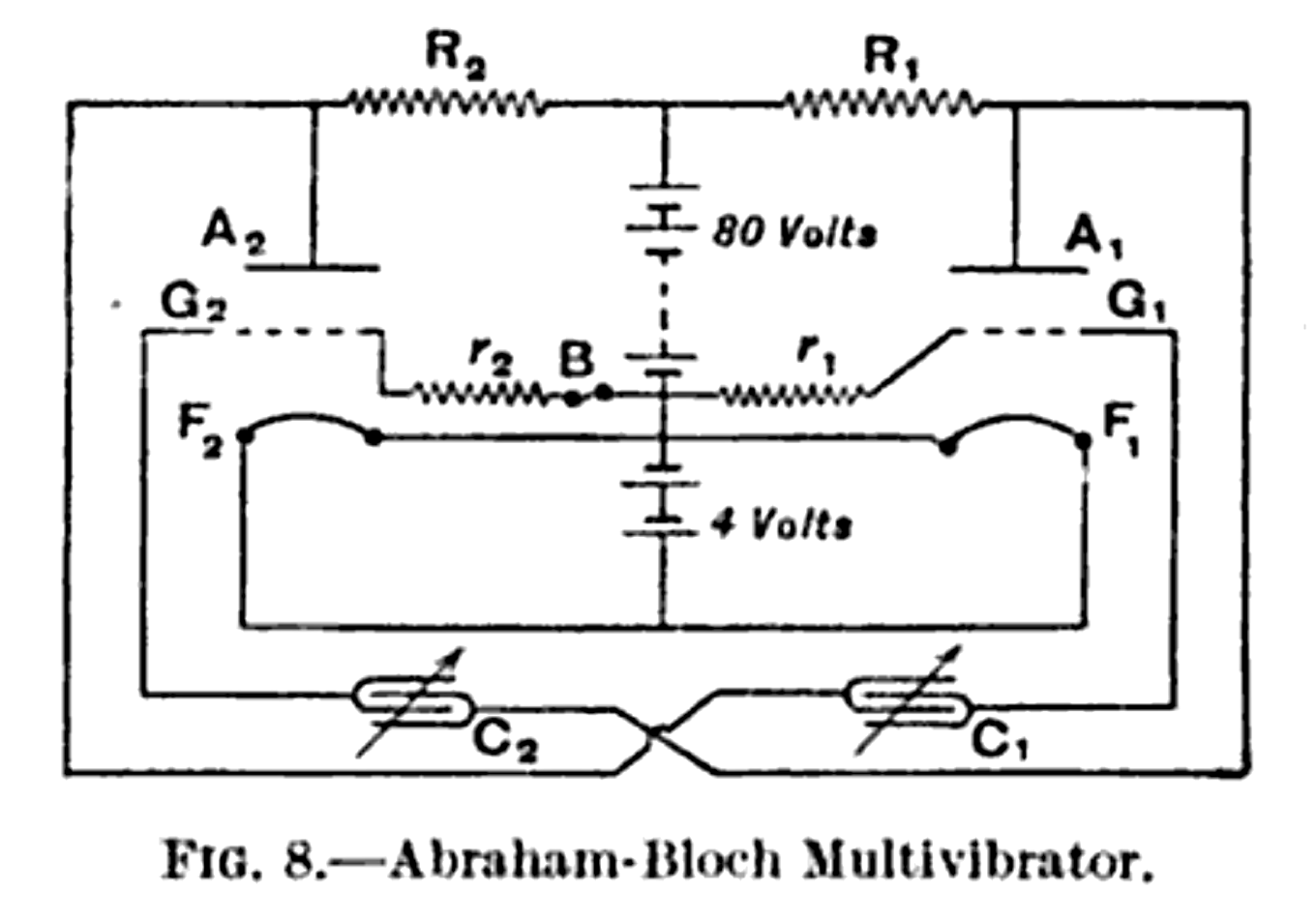
Original vacuum tube Abraham-Bloch multivibrator oscillator, from their 1919 paper

1. Astable multivibrator, in which the circuit is not stable in either state —it continually switches from one state to the other. It functions as a relaxation oscillator.
2. Monostable multivibrator, in which one of the states is stable, but the other state is unstable (transient). A trigger pulse causes the circuit to enter the unstable state. After entering the unstable state, the circuit will return to the stable state after a set time. Such a circuit is useful for creating a timing period of fixed duration in response to some external event. This circuit is also known as a one shot.
3. Bistable multivibrator, in which the circuit is stable in either state. It can be flipped from one state to the other by an external trigger pulse. This circuit is also known as a flip-flop or latch. It can store one bit of information, and is widely used in digital logic and computer memory.

Multivibrators find applications in a variety of systems where square waves or timed intervals are required. For example, before the advent of low-cost integrated circuits, chains of multivibrators found use as frequency dividers. A free-running multivibrator with a frequency of one-half to one-tenth of the reference frequency would accurately lock to the reference frequency. This technique was used in early electronic organs, to keep notes of different octaves accurately in tune. Other applications included early television systems, where the various line and frame frequencies were kept synchronized by pulses included in the video signal.

== History ==
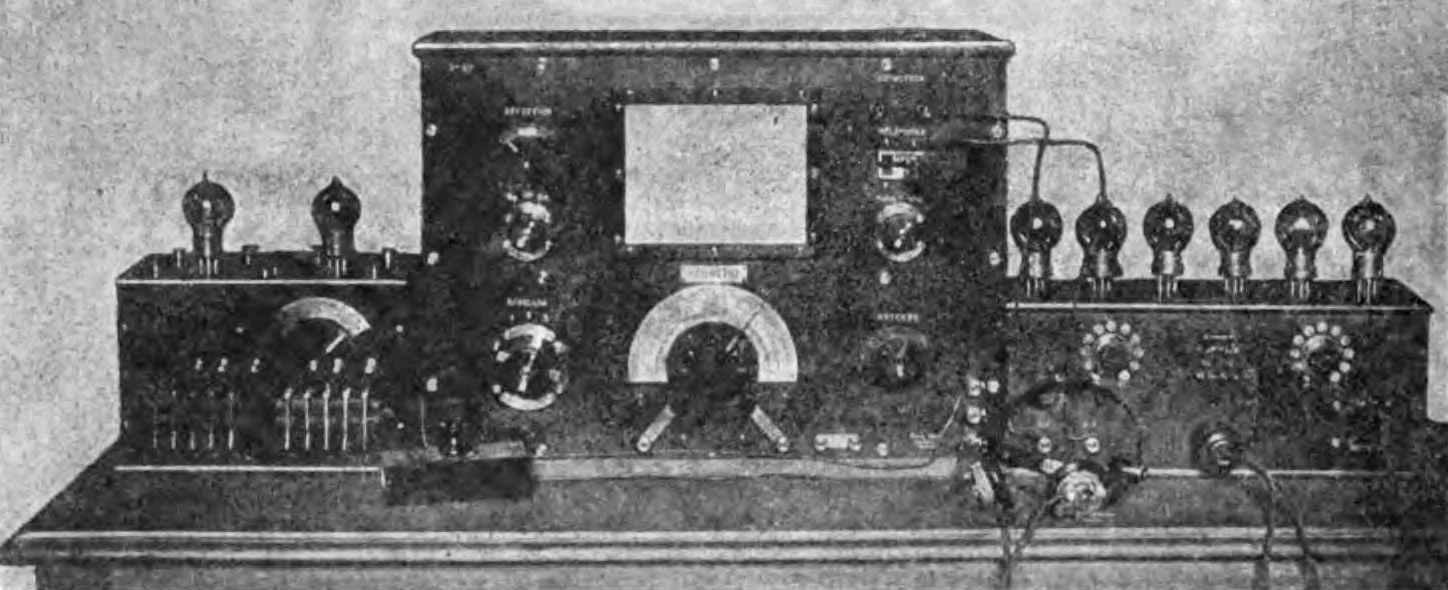
A vacuum tube Abraham-Bloch multivibrator oscillator, France, 1920 (small box, left). Its harmonics are being used to calibrate a wavemeter (center).

The first multivibrator circuit, the classic astable multivibrator oscillator (also called a plate-coupled multivibrator) was first described by Henri Abraham and Eugene Bloch in Publication 27 of the French Ministère de la Guerre, and in Annales de Physique 12, 252 (1919). Since it produced a square wave, in contrast to the sine wave generated by most other oscillator circuits of the time, its output contained many harmonics above the fundamental frequency, which could be used for calibrating high frequency radio circuits. For this reason Abraham and Bloch called it a multivibrateur. It is a predecessor of the Eccles-Jordan trigger which was derived from the circuit a year later.

Historically, the terminology of multivibrators has been somewhat variable:

- 1942 – multivibrator implies astable: "The multivibrator circuit (Fig. 7-6) is somewhat similar to the flip-flop circuit, but the coupling from the anode of one valve to the grid of the other is by a condenser only, so that the coupling is not maintained in the steady state."
- 1942 – multivibrator as a particular flip-flop circuit: "Such circuits were known as 'trigger' or 'flip-flop' circuits and were of very great importance. The earliest and best known of these circuits was the multivibrator."
- 1943 – flip-flop as one-shot pulse generator: "...an essential difference between the two-valve flip-flop and the multivibrator is that the flip-flop has one of the valves biased to cutoff."
- 1949 – monostable as flip-flop: "Monostable multivibrators have also been called 'flip-flops'."
- 1949 – monostable as flip-flop: "... a flip-flop is a monostable multivibrator and the ordinary multivibrator is an astable multivibrator."

== Astable ==
An astable multivibrator consists of two amplifying stages connected in a positive feedback loop by two capacitive-resistive coupling networks. The amplifying elements may be junction or field-effect transistors, vacuum tubes, operational amplifiers, or other types of amplifier. Figure 1, below right, shows bipolar junction transistors (BJT).

The circuit is usually drawn in a symmetric form as a cross-coupled pair. The two output terminals can be defined at the active devices and have complementary states. One has high voltage while the other has low voltage, except during the brief transitions from one state to the other.

=== Operation of a BJT astable multivibrator ===
The circuit has two astable (unstable) states that change alternatively with maximum transition rate because of the "accelerating" positive feedback. It is implemented by the coupling capacitors that instantly transfer voltage changes because the voltage across a capacitor cannot suddenly change. In each state, one transistor is switched on and the other is switched off. Accordingly, one fully charged capacitor discharges (reverse charges) slowly thus converting the time into an exponentially changing voltage. At the same time, the other empty capacitor quickly charges thus restoring its charge (the first capacitor acts as a time-setting capacitor and the second prepares to play this role in the next state). The circuit operation is based on the fact that the forward-biased base-emitter junction of the switched-on bipolar transistor can provide a path for the capacitor restoration.

State 1 (Q1 is switched on, Q2 is switched off)

Figure 1: Basic BJT astable multivibrator

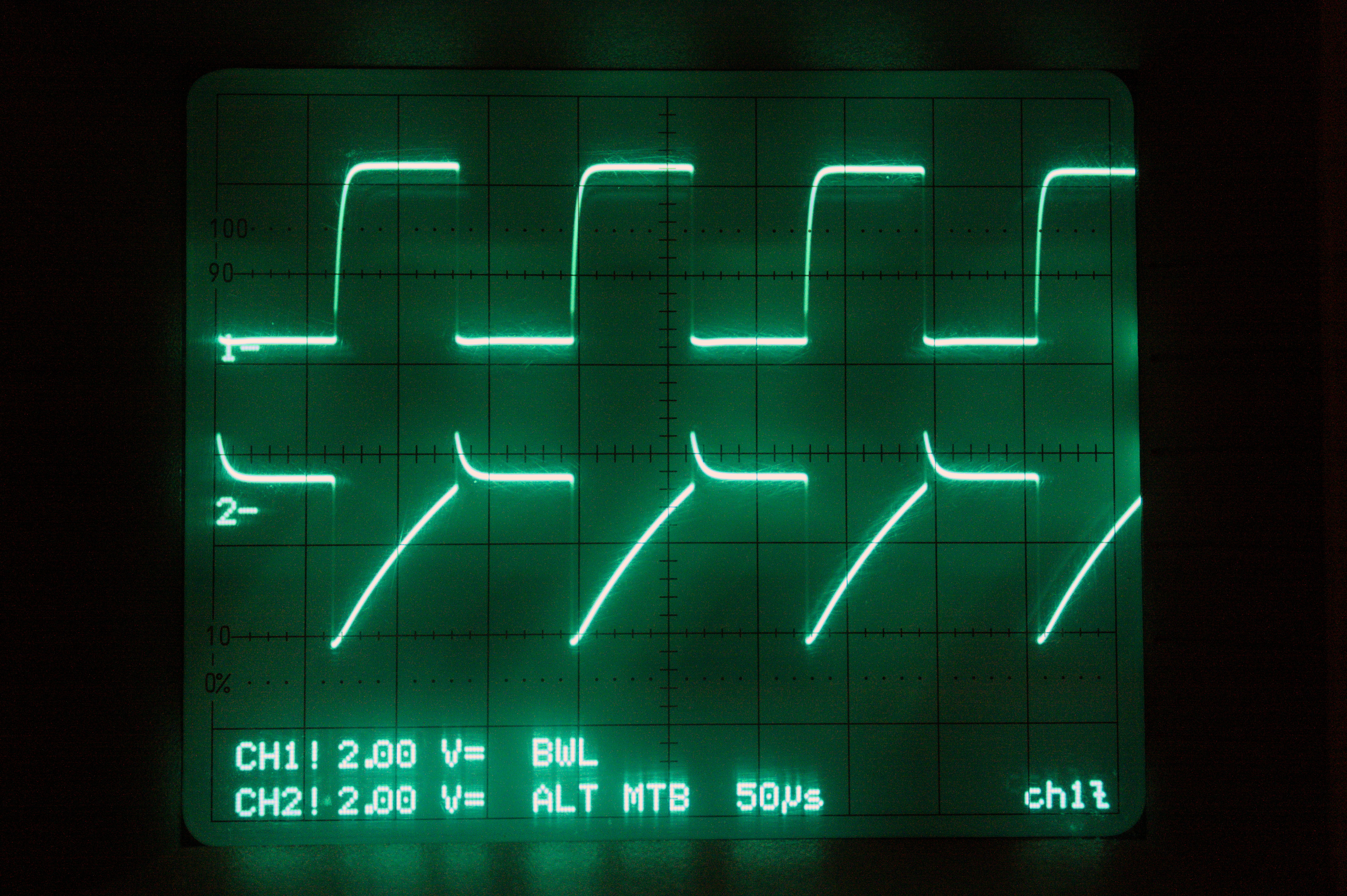
An oscilloscope shot of the voltage of the collector (trace 1) and the base (trace 2) of a transistor in an BJT astable multivibrator. The emitter of the transistor in this example is connected to ground.

In the beginning, the capacitor C1 is fully charged (in the previous State 2) to the power supply voltage V with the polarity shown in Figure 1. Q1 is on and connects the left-hand positive plate of C1 to ground. As its right-hand negative plate is connected to Q2 base, a maximum negative voltage (-V) is applied to Q2 base that keeps Q2 firmly off. C1 begins discharging (reverse charging) via the high-value base resistor R2, so that the voltage of its right-hand plate (and at the base of Q2) is rising from below ground (-V) toward +V. As Q2 base-emitter junction is reverse-biased, it does not conduct, so all the current from R2 goes into C1. Simultaneously, C2 that is fully discharged and even slightly charged to 0.6 V (in the previous State 2) quickly charges via the low-value collector resistor R4 and Q1 forward-biased base-emitter junction (because R4 is less than R2, C2 charges faster than C1). Thus C2 restores its charge and prepares for the next State 2 when it will act as a time-setting capacitor. Q1 is firmly saturated in the beginning by the "forcing" C2 charging current added to R3 current. In the end, only R3 provides the needed input base current. The resistance R3 is chosen small enough to keep Q1 (not deeply) saturated after C2 is fully charged.

When the voltage of C1 right-hand plate (Q2 base voltage) becomes positive and reaches 0.6 V, Q2 base-emitter junction begins diverting a part of R2 charging current. Q2 begins conducting and this starts the avalanche-like positive feedback process as follows. Q2 collector voltage begins falling; this change transfers through the fully charged C2 to Q1 base and Q1 begins cutting off. Its collector voltage begins rising; this change transfers back through the almost empty C1 to Q2 base and makes Q2 conduct more thus sustaining the initial input impact on Q2 base. Thus the initial input change circulates along the feedback loop and grows in an avalanche-like manner until finally Q1 switches off and Q2 switches on. The forward-biased Q2 base-emitter junction fixes the voltage of C1 right-hand plate at 0.6 V and does not allow it to continue rising toward +V.

State 2 (Q1 is switched off, Q2 is switched on)

Now, the capacitor C2 is fully charged (in the previous State 1) to the power supply voltage V with the polarity shown in Figure 1. Q2 is on and connects the right-hand positive plate of C2 to ground. As its left-hand negative plate is connected to Q1 base, a maximum negative voltage (-V) is applied to Q1 base that keeps Q1 firmly off. C2 begins discharging (reverse charging) via the high-value base resistor R3, so that the voltage of its left-hand plate (and at the base of Q1) is rising from below ground (-V) toward +V. Simultaneously, C1 that is fully discharged and even slightly charged to 0.6 V (in the previous State 1) quickly charges via the low-value collector resistor R1 and Q2 forward-biased base-emitter junction (because R1 is less than R3, C1 charges faster than C2). Thus C1 restores its charge and prepares for the next State 1 when it will act again as a time-setting capacitor...and so on... (the next explanations are a mirror copy of the second part of State 1).

=== Multivibrator frequency ===
==== Derivation ====
The duration of state 1 (low output) will be related to the time constant R_{2}C_{1} as it depends on the charging of C1, and the duration of state 2 (high output) will be related to the time constant R_{3}C_{2} as it depends on the charging of C2. Because they do not need to be the same, an asymmetric duty cycle is easily achieved.

The voltage on a capacitor with non-zero initial charge is:

$$V_\text{cap}(t) = \left[\left(V_\text{capinit} - V_\text{charging}\right) \cdot e^{-\frac{t}{RC}}\right] + V_\text{charging}$$

Looking at C2, just before Q2 turns on, the left terminal of C2 is at the base-emitter voltage of Q1 (V_{BE_Q1}) and the right terminal is at V_{CC} ("V_{CC}" is used here instead of "+V" to ease notation). The voltage across C2 is V_{CC} minus V_{BE_Q1} . The moment after Q2 turns on, the right terminal of C2 is now at 0 V which drives the left terminal of C2 to 0 V minus (V_{CC} - V_{BE_Q1}) or V_{BE_Q1} - V_{CC}. From this instant in time, the left terminal of C2 must be charged back up to V_{BE_Q1}. How long this takes is half our multivibrator switching time (the other half comes from C1). In the charging capacitor equation above, substituting:

V_{BE_Q1} for $V_\text{cap}(t)$
(V_{BE_Q1} - V_{CC}) for $V_\text{capinit}$
V_{CC} for $V_\text{charging}$

results in:

$$V_{\text{BE}\_\text{Q1}} = \left(\left[\left(V_{\text{BE}\_\text{Q1}} - V_\text{CC}\right) - V_\text{CC}\right] \cdot e^{-\frac{t}{RC}}\right) + V_\text{CC}$$

Solving for t results in:

$$t = -RC \cdot \ln\left(\frac{V_{\text{BE}\_\text{Q1}} - V_\text{CC}}{V_{\text{BE}\_\text{Q1}} - 2 V_\text{CC}}\right)$$

For this circuit to work, V_{CC}>>V_{BE_Q1} (for example: V_{CC}=5 V, V_{BE_Q1}=0.6 V), therefore the equation can be simplified to:

$$t = -RC \cdot\ln\left(\frac{-V_\text{CC}}{-2 V_\text{CC}}\right)$$

which can be simplified to:

$$t = -RC \cdot \ln\left(\frac{1}{2}\right) = RC \cdot \ln{2}$$

The period of each half of the multivibrator is therefore given by $t = R C \cdot \ln{2}$.

The total period of oscillation is given by:

$T = (R_2 C_1 + R_3 C_2) \cdot \ln{2}$

$f = \frac{1}{T} = \frac{1}{(R_2 C_1 + R_3 C_2) \cdot \ln{2}} \approx \frac{1.443}{R_2 C_1 + R_3 C_2}$

where...

- f is frequency in hertz.
- R_{2} and R_{3} are resistor values in ohms.
- C_{1} and C_{2} are capacitor values in farads.
- T is the period (In this case, the sum of two period durations).

For the special case where

- t_{1} = t_{2} (50% duty cycle)
- R_{2} = R_{3}
- C_{1} = C_{2}

$f = \frac{1}{T} = \frac{1}{2R C \cdot \ln{2}} \approx \frac{0.72}{RC}$

==== Output pulse shape ====
The output voltage has a shape that approximates a square waveform. It is considered below for the transistor Q1.

During State 1, Q2 base-emitter junction is reverse-biased and capacitor C1 is "unhooked" from ground. The output voltage of the switched-on transistor Q1 changes rapidly from high to low since this low-resistive output is loaded by a high impedance load (the series connected capacitor C1 and the high-resistive base resistor R2).

During State 2, Q2 base-emitter junction is forward-biased and capacitor C1 is "hooked" to ground. The output voltage of the switched-off transistor Q1 changes exponentially from low to high since this relatively high resistive output is loaded by a low impedance load (capacitor C1). This is the output voltage of R_{1}C_{1} integrating circuit.

To approach the needed square waveform, the collector resistors have to be low in resistance. The base resistors have to be low enough to make the transistors saturate in the end of the restoration (R_{B} < β.R_{C}).

=== Initial power-up ===
When the circuit is first powered up, neither transistor will be switched on. However, this means that at this stage they will both have high base voltages and therefore a tendency to switch on, and inevitable slight asymmetries will mean that one of the transistors is first to switch on. This will quickly put the circuit into one of the above states, and oscillation will ensue. In practice, oscillation always occurs for practical values of R and C.

However, if the circuit is temporarily held with both bases high, for longer than it takes for both capacitors to charge fully, then the circuit will remain in this stable state, with both bases at 0.60 V, both collectors at 0 V, and both capacitors charged backwards to −0.60 V. This can occur at startup without external intervention, if R and C are both very small.

=== Frequency divider ===
An astable multivibrator can be synchronized to an external chain of pulses. A single pair of active devices can be used to divide a reference by a large ratio, however, the stability of the technique is poor owing to the variability of the power supply and the circuit elements. A division ratio of 10, for example, is easy to obtain but not dependable. Chains of bistable flip-flops provide more predictable division, at the cost of more active elements.

=== Protective components ===
While not fundamental to circuit operation, diodes connected in series with the base or emitter of the transistors are required to prevent the base-emitter junction being driven into reverse breakdown when the supply voltage is in excess of the V_{eb} breakdown voltage, typically around 5-10 volts for general purpose silicon transistors. In the monostable configuration, only one of the transistors requires protection.

Astable Multivibrator using Op-Amp circuit

=== Astable multivibrator using an op-amp ===
Assume all the capacitors to be discharged at first. The output of the op-amp V_{o} at node c is +V_{sat} initially. At node a, a voltage of +β V_{sat} is formed due to voltage division where $\beta=\left [ \frac{R2}{R1+R2} \right ]$. The current that flows from nodes c and b to ground charges the capacitor C towards +V_{sat}. During this charging period, the voltage at b becomes greater than +β V_{sat}at some point. The voltage at inverting terminal will be greater than the voltage at the non-inverting terminal of the op-amp. This is a comparator circuit and hence, the output becomes -V_{sat}. The voltage at node a becomes -βV_{sat} due to voltage division. Now the capacitor discharges towards -V_{sat}. At some point, the voltage at b becomes less than -β V_{sat}. The voltage at the non-inverting terminal will be greater than the voltage at the inverting terminal of the op-amp. So, the output of the op-amp is +V_{sat}. This repeats and forms a free-running oscillator or an astable multivibrator.

If V_{C} is the voltage across the capacitor and from the graph, the time period of the wave formed at capacitor and the output would match, then the time period could be calculated in this way:

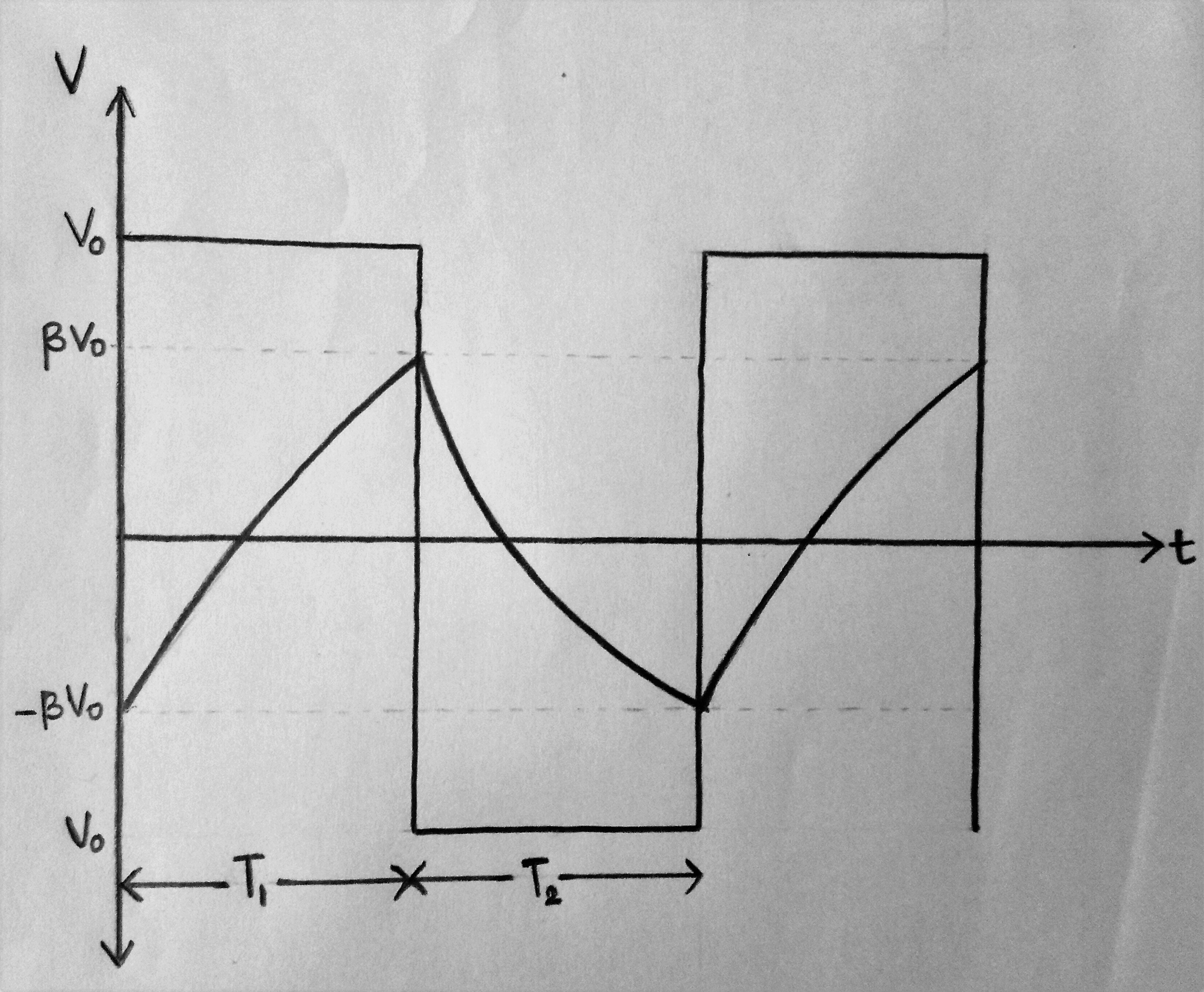
Graph showing the output waveform of the op-amp and the waveform formed across the capacitor C.

$V_c = V_c(\infty)+[V_c(0)-V_c(\infty)]e^\tfrac{-t}{RC}$

$V_c(t)= V_{sat} + [-\beta V_{sat} - V_{sat} ] e^{\left ( \frac{-t}{RC} \right )}$

At t =T1,

$\beta V_{sat} = V_{sat} (1-[\beta +1]e^{\tfrac{-T1}{RC}})$

Upon solving, we get:

$T1 = RC\ln\left [ \frac{1+\beta}{1-\beta} \right ]$

We are taking values of R, C and β such that we get a symmetrical square wave. Thus, we get T1 = T2 and total time period T = T1 + T2. So, the time period of the square wave generated at the output is:

$T=2RC\ln\left [\frac{1+\beta}{1-\beta} \right]$

== Monostable ==
Figure 2: Basic BJT monostable multivibrator

In the monostable multivibrator, one resistive-capacitive network (C_{2}-R_{3} in Figure 1) is replaced by a resistive network (just a resistor). The circuit can be thought as a 1/2 astable multivibrator. Q2 collector voltage is the output of the circuit (in contrast to the astable circuit, it has a perfect square waveform since the output is not loaded by the capacitor).

When triggered by an input pulse, a monostable multivibrator will switch to its unstable position for a period of time, and then return to its stable state. The time period monostable multivibrator remains in unstable state is given by t = ln(2)R_{2}C_{1}. If repeated application of the input pulse maintains the circuit in the unstable state, it is called a retriggerable monostable. If further trigger pulses do not affect the period, the circuit is a non-retriggerable multivibrator.

For the circuit in Figure 2, in the stable state Q1 is turned off and Q2 is turned on. It is triggered by zero or negative input signal applied to Q2 base (with the same success it can be triggered by applying a positive input signal through a resistor to Q1 base). As a result, the circuit goes in State 1 described above. After elapsing the time, it returns to its stable initial state.

=== Monostable using op-amp ===
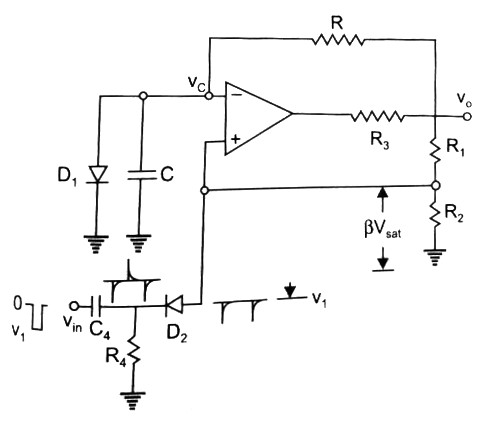
monostable multivibrator using op-amp

The circuit is useful for generating single output pulse of adjustable time duration in response to a triggering signal. The width of the output pulse depends only on external components connected to the op-amp. A diode D1 clamps the capacitor voltage to 0.7 V when the output is at +Vsat. Let us assume that in the stable state the output Vo = +Vsat. The diode D1 clamps the capacitor to 0.7 V. The voltage at the non-inverting terminal through the potential divider will be + βVsat. Now a negative trigger of magnitude V1 is applied to the non-inverting terminal so that the effective signal at this terminal is less than 0.7 V. Then the output voltage switches from +Vsat to -Vsat. The diode will now get reverse biased and the capacitor starts charging exponentially to -Vsat through R. The voltage at the non-inverting terminal through the potential divider will be - βVsat. After some time the capacitor charges to a voltage more than - βVsat. The voltage on the non-inverting input is now greater than on the inverting input and the output of the op-amp switches again to +Vsat. The capacitor discharges through resistor R and charges again to 0.7 V.

The pulse width T of a monostable multivibrator is calculated as follows: The general solution for a low pass RC circuit is

$$V_o = V_f +(V_i - V_f)e^{-t/RC}$$

where $V_f = -V_\text{sat}$ and $V_i = V_d$, the diode forward voltage. Therefore,

$$V_c = -V_\text{sat} +(V_d + V_\text{sat})e^{-t/RC}$$

at $t = T$,

$$V_c = -\beta V_\text{sat}$$
$$-\beta V_\text{sat} = -V_\text{sat} +(V_d + V_\text{sat})e^{-T/RC}$$

after simplification,

$$T = RC\ln\left({1+V_d/V_\text{sat} \over 1 - \beta}\right)$$

where $\beta = {R2 \over R1+R2}$

If $V_\text{sat} >> V_d$ and $R1 = R2$ so that $\beta=0.5$, then $T = 0.69RC$

== Bistable ==
Figure 3: Basic animated interactive BJT bistable multivibrator circuit (suggested values: R1, R2 = 1 kΩ R3, R4 = 10 kΩ)

In the bistable multivibrator, both resistive-capacitive networks (C_{1}-R_{2} and C_{2}-R_{3} in Figure 1) are replaced by resistive networks (just resistors or direct coupling).

This latch circuit is similar to an astable multivibrator, except that there is no charge or discharge time, due to the absence of capacitors. Hence, when the circuit is switched on, if Q1 is on, its collector is at 0 V. As a result, Q2 gets switched off. This results in more than half +V volts being applied to R4 causing current into the base of Q1, thus keeping it on. Thus, the circuit remains stable in a single state continuously. Similarly, Q2 remains on continuously, if it happens to get switched on first.

Switching of state can be done via Set and Reset terminals connected to the bases. For example, if Q2 is on and Set is grounded momentarily, this switches Q2 off, and makes Q1 on. Thus, Set is used to "set" Q1 on, and Reset is used to "reset" it to off state.

== See also ==
- Blocking oscillator
- RC circuit
- Schmitt trigger
