= Eugene Bloch =

French physicist (1878–1944)

Eugène Bloch
- Born: 10 June 1878; Soultz-Haut-Rhin, Alsace-Lorraine, German Empire
- Died: 1944 (aged 65–66); Auschwitz concentration camp, Poland
- Education: University of Paris
- Known for: Multivibrator
- Scientific career
- Fields: Physics
- Workplaces: University of Paris; École normale supérieur

Eugène Bloch (10 June 1878 – 1944) was a French physicist and professor at the École Normale Supérieure, and at the Faculty of Science of the University of Paris. He is known for designing the first multivibrator. Bloch was executed in Auschwitz concentration camp during The Holocaust.

== Life ==
=== Early years and education ===
Bloch was born on 10 June 1878 in Soultz-Haut-Rhin, Alsace-Lorraine, in the German Empire. His father, an industrialist in the textile industry, sold his Alsatian factory and settled in Paris to give his two sons Leon and Eugène a French education. Eugène studied from 1897 to 1900 at the École normale supérieure, where he studied the physics of Jules Violle, Marcel Brillouin, and Henri Abraham, and at the Faculty of Sciences of the University of Paris, where he attended the courses of Gabriel Lippmann and Edmond Bouty and obtained degrees in physics and mathematical sciences in 1899.

After having obtained the highest score in the aggregation examination, he taught at the physics laboratory of the École normale supérieur while preparing his Ph.D. in Physical Science on ionization in phosphorescence which he defended at the Faculty of Sciences of the University of Paris in 1904.

=== Career and works ===
In 1906 Bloch became professor of physics in the special mathematics class at the Saint-Louis secondary school in Paris, where he taught for eleven years. In addition to his teaching, he also carried out research in the physics laboratory of the École normale supérieure on the photoelectric effect and spectroscopy.

In 1908 Bloch completed the studies that he had pursued following his thesis and devoted himself to studying the photoelectric effect (discovered by Heinrich Hertz in 1887 and then studied by Phillip Lenard around 1902). Unlike Lenard, Bloch understood the importance of distinguishing various colors, or wavelengths of light, instead of using white light. His experiments helped to support the interpretation given by Albert Einstein in 1905.

During World War I, Henri Abraham and Bloch designed the first astable multivibrator.

In 1925 he developed the first spectrograph with a concave, reflective, and vacuum network which worked in the far ultra-violet up to wavelengths of up to 20 nm. The tables of wavelengths established with this apparatus on 30 chemical elements, and their variously charged ions, are still in use.

=== Capture and death ===
In 1940 Bloch was dismissed from his professorship following the anti-Jewish laws of the Vichy government and had to leave the École normale superieure. He was succeeded by Georges Bruhat. Bloch passed clandestinely to the "free zone", and worked in a laboratory of the University of Lyon. This was formalized in 1941 as an official assignment of the newly formed French National Centre for Scientific Research. When the German army invaded the Free Zone in 1942, Bloch attempted unsuccessfully to flee to Switzerland. He then hid under a false identity in the mountains of Savoy. The Gestapo found and arrested him at Allevard on 24 January 1944. He was deported from Bobigny station by Convoy no. 69 of 7 March 1944 and was murdered at the Auschwitz concentration camp.

== Honors ==
The Three Physicists Prize is named after Abraham, Bruhat and Bloch; all three died in deportation in Nazi camps.

== Publications ==
- Théorie cinétique des gaz, éditeur Armand Colin 1921.
- Phénomènes Thermoioniques, éditions du Journal de Physique 1921.
- Enregistrement des signaux de TSF , 1921.
- L'ancienne et la nouvelle théorie des quanta, éditions Hermann, 1930.

== See also ==
- Three Physicists Prize
- Henri-Alexandre Danlos
