= Henri Abraham =

French physicist (1868–1943)

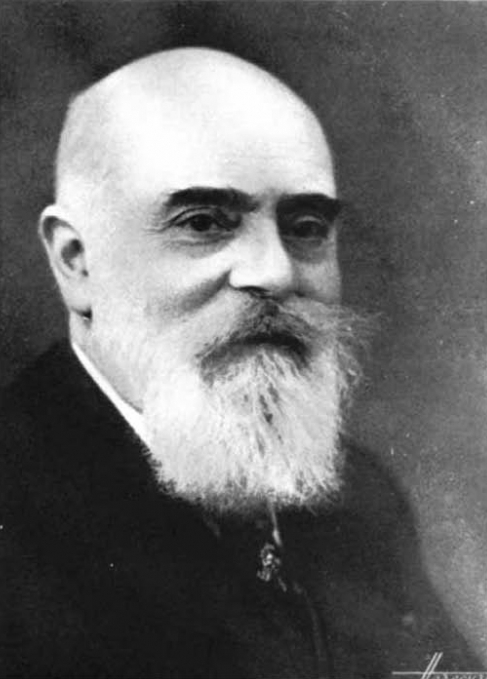
- Henri Abraham in 1935, photo by Studio Harcourt
- Born: 12 July 1868; Paris, France
- Died: 22 December 1943 (aged 75); Auschwitz, Nazi Germany
- Education: École normale supérieure
- Known for: Multivibrator
- Scientific career
- Fields: Physics
- Workplaces: University of Paris
- Thesis: Sur une nouvelle détermination du rapport ν entre les unités C.G.S. électromagnétiques et électrostatiques (1892)
- Doctoral advisor: Jules Violle

Henri Azariah Abraham (12 July 1868–22 December 1943) was a French physicist who made important contributions to the science of radio waves. He performed some of the first measurements of the propagation velocity of radio waves, helped develop France's first triode vacuum tube, and with Eugene Bloch invented the astable multivibrator. He was executed at Auschwitz during the Holocaust.

== Life ==
Henri Abraham was born on 12 July 1868 in the 1st arrondissement of Paris. After brilliant studies at Chaptal secondary school, from 1886 to 1889 he pursued scientific graduate studies at the École normale supérieure, where he attended the lectures of physics professors Jules Violle and Marcel Brillouin, and the Faculty of Paris, where he studied physics with Gabriel Lippmann and Edmond Bouty and obtained degrees in physical sciences and in mathematical sciences. He was then appointed for one year preparer physics laboratory of the École normale supérieure, then led by Jules Violle, where he wrote his thesis for the doctorate in physical sciences: "New determination of the ratio between CGS electromagnetic and electrostatic units", which he received in 1892. He served as professor at Collège Chaptal (November 1890 – September 1894), then at the Lycée Louis-le-Grand (September 1894 – November 1900).

Lecturer at the École normale supérieure from 1897 (1899–1900 3rd year), he was appointed lecturer in physics in November 1900, then the conference's second year with Marcel Brillouin, then it supports the Conferences 1st year. He also succeeded Jules Violle as director of the physics laboratory of the school. He served as director of the laboratory at the École pratique des hautes études from 1904 to 1905. After the annexation of the École normale supérieure by the University of Paris, he was appointed on 1 November 1904 Lecturer of Physics at the Faculty of Paris, delegate to the École normale supérieure, then professor of physics in 1912. He served a term as exchange professor to Brazil in 1922. He retired in October 1937, when he received an honorary award. Eugene Bloch succeeded him as director of the physics laboratory, while Pierre Auger was his successor for physics conferences.

He was Secretary General of the Société Française de Physique from 1900 to 1912 and its president in 1922. With Gustave-Auguste Ferrié, he founded the League of Radioélectriciens in 1921, and succeeded him as president in 1934. He was also president of the Society of clotting France in 1932, and in 1934 Secretary General of the International Union of Pure and Applied Physics (IUPAP).

Arrested by the militia on the night of 23 June 1943 in Aix-en-Provence, he was delivered to the Gestapo and taken to Marseille on 7 December at Drancy before being deported from the Bobigny station on "Convoy No. 63" 17 December 1943 to Auschwitz concentration camp, where he was probably murdered on arrival, on 22 December 1943. The Three Physicists Prize was named to honour him, Bloch and Georges Bruhat, who also were murdered in Nazi concentration camps.

== Scientific work ==
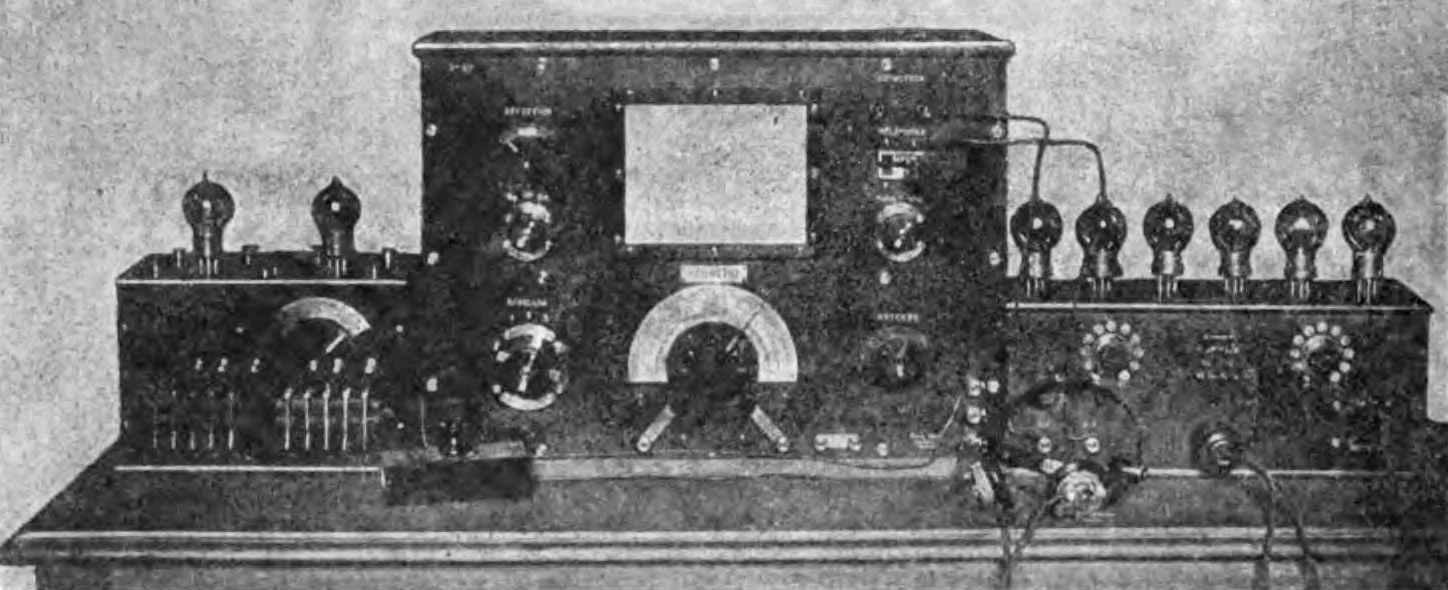
One of Abraham and Bloch's early astable multivibrators (small box, left) being used to calibrate a wavemeter (center)

As a student at the ENS, Henri Abraham was fascinated by the pioneering experiments of Heinrich Hertz in 1888 on radio waves which confirmed the predictions of Maxwell's equations, established in 1864. His entire scientific career was devoted to developing applications of electromagnetic theory. In his thesis, he created a new measure of the relationship between units of electric charge used at that time in the electrostatic and the electromagnetic CGS systems of units. The ratio of these units was equal to the speed of wave propagation c, according to Maxwell. His work inferred a value of this speed with an uncertainty of 1/2000 that of experiments performed by the best physicists of the time.

In 1899–1900, he measured very short time constants of the Kerr effect, a few billionths of a second, or about the time it takes light to travel one meter. Between 1911 and 1914, he made the first measurements of the actual speed of electromagnetic wave propagation, measuring the propagation times between remote stations (in collaboration with Alexandre Dufour and G. Ferrie). Mobilized in 1914 in the Department of Military Telegraphy, under the direction of Commander Ferrie, in collaboration with Eugene Bloch he developed the first French triode amplifying vacuum tube for radio reception. He and Bloch also invented the astable multivibrator. The harmonics produced by this device provided the first accurate technique for measuring radio frequencies, which was employed in 1916 in the French and British armies, and in the U.S. Army after 1917.

After the war, Abraham helped his former pupil Alexandre Dufour achieve the first devices foreshadowing our modern CRT oscilloscopes, and to record the oscillations of high frequency radio waves. He also directed the thesis of Peter Fleury (1921).

In the thesis of his pupil Jean Mercier in 1923, a method is described which allows accurate measure of the frequency f of a radio wave and its wavelength L (distance traveled by the wave during the time period T = 1/f ). This measure allows deduction of the speed of light c = L /T = L f with an unparalleled accuracy of 1:10,000. The same measurement method, applied with modern techniques after World War II in 1973, achieved a precision of nine significant digits, leading to a change in the definition of the meter.

== Legacy ==
The Three Physicists Prize and the Henri Abraham Award are awarded in the memory of Abraham.

== Publications ==
- Recueil d'Expériences de Physique par H. Abraham avec la collaboration de nombreux physiciens; édition 1904, édition 1923, chez Gautier-Villard
- Recueil de Constantes Physiques par H. Abraham et P. Sacerdote, éditions Gautier-Villard 1913
