= Daniel Choquet =

French neuroscientist (b. 1962)

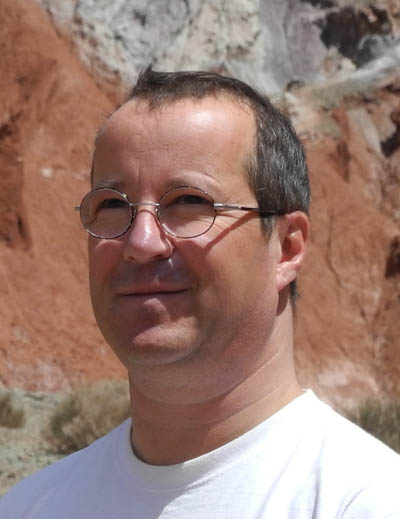
- Choquet in 2011
- Born: 23 April 1962 (age 64); Paris, France
- Education: École Centrale Paris; Pierre and Marie Curie University (PhD)
- Mother: Yvonne Choquet-Bruhat
- Scientific career
- Fields: Neuroscience
- Workplaces: CNRS and others

Daniel Choquet (born 23 April 1962) is a French neuroscientist working at the French National Centre for Scientific Research (CNRS).

== Personal life and career ==
Daniel Choquet is the son of the mathematical physicist Yvonne Choquet-Bruhat and the mathematician Gustave Choquet, and a grandson of the physicist Georges Bruhat. He obtained his bachelor's degree in 1979, followed by a degree in bioengineering from École centrale Paris in 1984. He obtained his P.hD. in 1988 from Pierre and Marie Curie University and studied pharmacology at the Pasteur Institute. That year, he started working for the French National Centre for Scientific Research (CNRS). From 1994 to 1996, he was a post-doctoral fellow at Duke University. The following year, in 1997, he was promoted to research director at the CNRS. He is the director of the Bordeaux Imaging Center and the Interdisciplinary Institute for Neuroscience. He was elected as a member of the French Academy of Sciences on 30 November 2010.

== Research ==
Choquet is a biologist, focusing on nanoscopic imaging and the organization of receptors in neurons. His early research included work on the properties of ion channels of B lymphocytes. This research work earned him the CNRS Bronze medal in 1990. During his post-doc at Duke, he discovered that cells can respond and adapt to the mechanical properties of their environment.

Since 1996, he has researched the fundamental properties of the transmission of nerve impulses in the brain and developed new nanoscale imaging techniques. He discovered that receptors move in living neurons and that these movements in and out synapses participate to synaptic plasticity, a phenomenon thought to underlie learning and memory. Choquet's current work involves attempting to understand the role of receptor movements in neurodegenerative diseases. His recent research work has earned him the 2004 CEA Prize and the 2009 CNRS Silver Medal.

== Awards ==
- 1990: CNRS Bronze medal
- 1994: Petit-Dormoy prize of the Académie des Sciences
- 1994: Prize of the "société de secours des amis de la science"
- 1997: Research prize form the Fondation pour la recherche médicale
- 2004: Grand prix de l'Académie des Sciences, prize of the CEA
- 2006: Labeled FRM team by the "Fondation pour la Recherche Médicale"
- 2007: Laureate of the "Bauer Lectureship award", Brandeis University
- 2008: Laureate of an "ERC advanced research grant" from the European Commission
- 2009: Nominated author of the year 2008 by the French Society for Neurosciences
- 2009: CNRS Silver Medal
- 2010: Elected member of the French Academy of Sciences, integrative biology section
- 2011: Laureate of the "Victoires de la médecine 2011"
- 2012: Nominated "Chevalier de l'ordre des Palmes académiques"
- 2013 : laureate of an "ERC advanced research grant" from the European Commission
- 2014: Elected member of EMBO
- 2015 : elected member of the Academia Europaea
- 2016 : Nominated "chevalier de l'ordre de la légion d'honneur"
- 2018 : laureate of an "ERC advanced research grant" from the European Commission
- 2021 : Nominated "officier de l'ordre des Palmes académiques"
