= Gustave Choquet =

French mathematician (1915–2006)

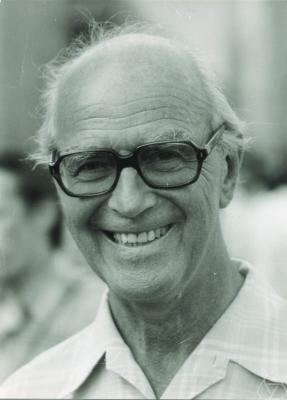
- Choquet in 1983
- Born: 1 March 1915; Solesmes, Nord, France
- Died: 14 November 2006 (aged 91); Lyon, France
- Education: École Normale Supérieure
- Known for: Capacity of a set Choquet game Choquet theory Choquet integral Radó–Kneser–Choquet theorem
- Spouse: Yvonne Choquet-Bruhat
- Children: 2, including Daniel
- Awards: Prix de l'État (1968); Peccot Lectures (1946–1947)
- Scientific career
- Fields: Mathematics
- Workplaces: Pierre and Marie Curie University
- Doctoral advisor: Arnaud Denjoy
- Doctoral students: Jean-Michel Bony; Haïm Brezis; Nassif Ghoussoub; Léon Motchane; Michel Talagrand

Gustave Choquet (French: [ɡystav ʃɔkɛ]; 1 March 1915 – 14 November 2006) was a French mathematician.

Choquet was born in Solesmes, Nord. His contributions include work in functional analysis, potential theory, topology and measure theory. He is known for creating the Choquet theory, the Choquet integral and the theory of capacities.

He did postgraduate work at the École Normale Supérieure Paris where his advisor was Arnaud Denjoy. He was Professor at the University of Paris (subsequently Paris VI) from 1940 to 1984 and was also Professor at the École Polytechnique from 1960 to 1969. His honours and awards included being a Member of the Académie des Sciences, and an Officier of the Légion d’Honneur.

His students include Haïm Brezis, Gilles Godefroy, Nassif Ghoussoub, Michel L. Lapidus, and Michel Talagrand.

He was married to mathematician and mathematical physicist Yvonne Choquet-Bruhat, with whom he had a son Daniel and a daughter Geneviève. He died in Lyon in 2006.

== Bibliography ==
- Choquet, Gustave (1986), "La naissance de la théorie des capacités: réflexion sur une expérience personnelle", Comptes rendus de l'Académie des sciences. Série générale, La Vie des sciences (in French), 3 (4): 385–397, MR 0867115, Zbl 0607.01017, available from Gallica. It is an historical account on the development of the theory of capacities by the founder of the theory and one of the main contributors; an English translation of the title reads as: "The birth of capacity theory: reflections on a personal experience".
- Choquet, Gustave (1969), Lectures on Analysis, 3 Vols., W.A. Benjamin, Inc., New York.

== See also ==
- Borůvka's algorithm
