= Georges Bruhat =

French physicist (1887–1945)

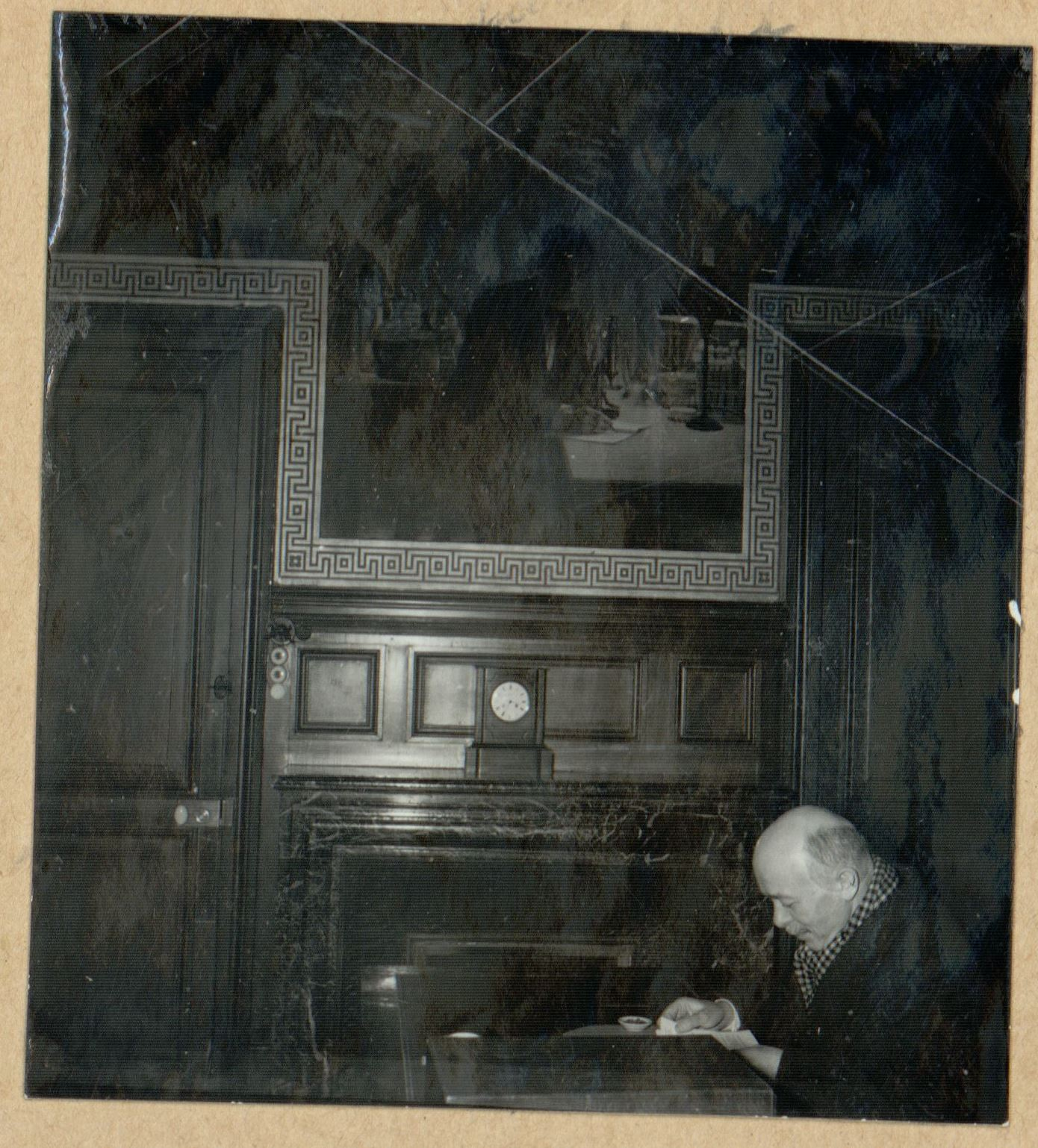
- Bruhat in 1940
- Born: 21 December 1887; Besançon, France
- Died: 1 January 1945 (aged 57); Sachsenhausen concentration camp
- Education: École normale supérieure, Paris
- Works: Cours de physique générale
- Children: Yvonne; François
- Awards: Three Physicists Prize (Prix des trois physiciens)
- Scientific career
- Fields: Mathematics, physics
- Workplaces: École normale supérieure, Paris and others

Georges Bruhat (21 December 1887 – 1 January 1945) was a French physicist. He was known for his physics textbooks. He helped develop sound-detection technology during World War I and later became director of École normale supérieure. During World War II, he was arrested by the Gestapo and was deported to Germany. The Three Physicists Prize was created in honor of Henri Abraham, Eugene Bloch and Bruhat who died in concentration camps.

== Life and academic career ==
=== Early life and education ===
Bruhat studied physics from 1906 until 1909 at the École normale supérieure of Paris (ENS), with, among other, Henri Abraham, Marcel Brillouin and Aimé Cotton, and at the Sorbonne, among others with Gabriel Lippmann and Edmond Bouty. After being awarded a first degree in mathematics and physics, he taught for a year at Gymnasium and afterwards was an assistant at the École normale supérieure of Paris, which gave him time to prepare his PhD thesis with Aimé Cotton in optics, which he defended in 1914 before the start of World War I.

=== War activities and death ===
During the war he was involved with the development of devices for detection via sound, for which he received the Croix de Guerre. Starting in 1919 he became a professor at University of Lille and then in 1927 at the Faculté des sciences in Paris, assigned to ENS. In 1935 he became acting director and in 1941–42 Director of ENS. In 1940 he succeeded Eugene Bloch who had been removed by the Vichy Regime's antisemitic laws. In 1944 he was arrested by the Gestapo since he was unwilling to collaborate in locating a student member of the French resistance at the school. On 16 August 1944, he was deported to Buchenwald concentration camp and died on 1 January 1945 in Sachsenhausen of a lung infection.

He is the father of mathematician François Bruhat and mathematical physicist Yvonne Choquet-Bruhat.

== Research and books ==
Georges Bruhat performed research in optics (for instance optically active media, double refraction, wavelength dependencies of absorption and refractive index) and was known in France for his four-volume physics texts (Cours de physique générale, Masson). The volume on electricity appeared in 1924 (8. Edition 1963), that on thermodynamics in 1926 (6. Edition 1968 revised by Alfred Kastler), the volume on optics in 1930 (6. Edition 1968, revised by Kastler), and that on mechanics in 1934 (6. Edition, 1967). A monograph on polarisation was published in 1930 (Traité de la Polarimétrie).

== Honors ==
The Three Physicists Prize (Prix des trois physiciens) was founded in 1951 to honor Georges Bruhat along with Eugene Bloch and Henri Abraham.

== Publications ==
- Georges Bruhat; Cours de physique générale. Le cours comporte les quatre volumes suivants :
  - Électricité, Masson (8th édition-1963), 912 pp; revue par G. Goudet.
  - Thermodynamique, Masson (6th édition-1968), 912 p. 6th édition revue et augmentée par Alfred Kastler, prix Nobel de physique 1966.
  - Optique, Masson (6th édition-1965), 1026 p. revue et augmentée par Alfred Kastler. Rééditée par Dunod (2004) : ISBN 2-10-048856-2.
  - Mécanique, Masson (6th édition-1967), 726 p. d'après son cours donné à l'École normale supérieure de jeunes filles, revue par A. Foch.
- Traité de Polarimétrie, éditions de la Revue d'Optique, 1930.
- Le Soleil, librairie Félix Alcan, Nouvelle collection scientifique, 1931.
- Les Etoiles, librairie Félix Alcan, Nouvelle collection scientifique, 1939.

Books listed at Worldcat

== Literature ==
- Les trois physiciens Henri Abraham, Eugène Bloch, Georges Bruhat, Éditions ENS Rue d'Ulm, 2009.
