= Compactly generated group =

In mathematics, a compactly generated (topological) group is a topological group G which is algebraically generated by one of its compact subsets. This should not be confused with the unrelated notion (widely used in algebraic topology) of a compactly generated space -- one whose topology is generated (in a suitable sense) by its compact subspaces.

== Definition ==
A topological group G is said to be compactly generated if there exists a compact subset K of G such that

$$\langle K\rangle = \bigcup_{n \in \mathbb{N}} (K \cup K^{-1})^n = G.$$

So if K is symmetric, i.e. K = K^{−1}, then

$$G = \bigcup_{n \in \mathbb{N}} K^n.$$

== Locally compact case ==
This property is interesting in the case of locally compact topological groups, since locally compact compactly generated topological groups can be approximated by locally compact, separable metric factor groups of G. More precisely, for a sequence

U_{n}

of open identity neighborhoods, there exists a normal subgroup N contained in the intersection of that sequence, such that

G/N

is locally compact metric separable (the Kakutani-Kodaira-Montgomery-Zippin theorem).
