= Yvonne Choquet-Bruhat =

French mathematical physicist (1923–2025)

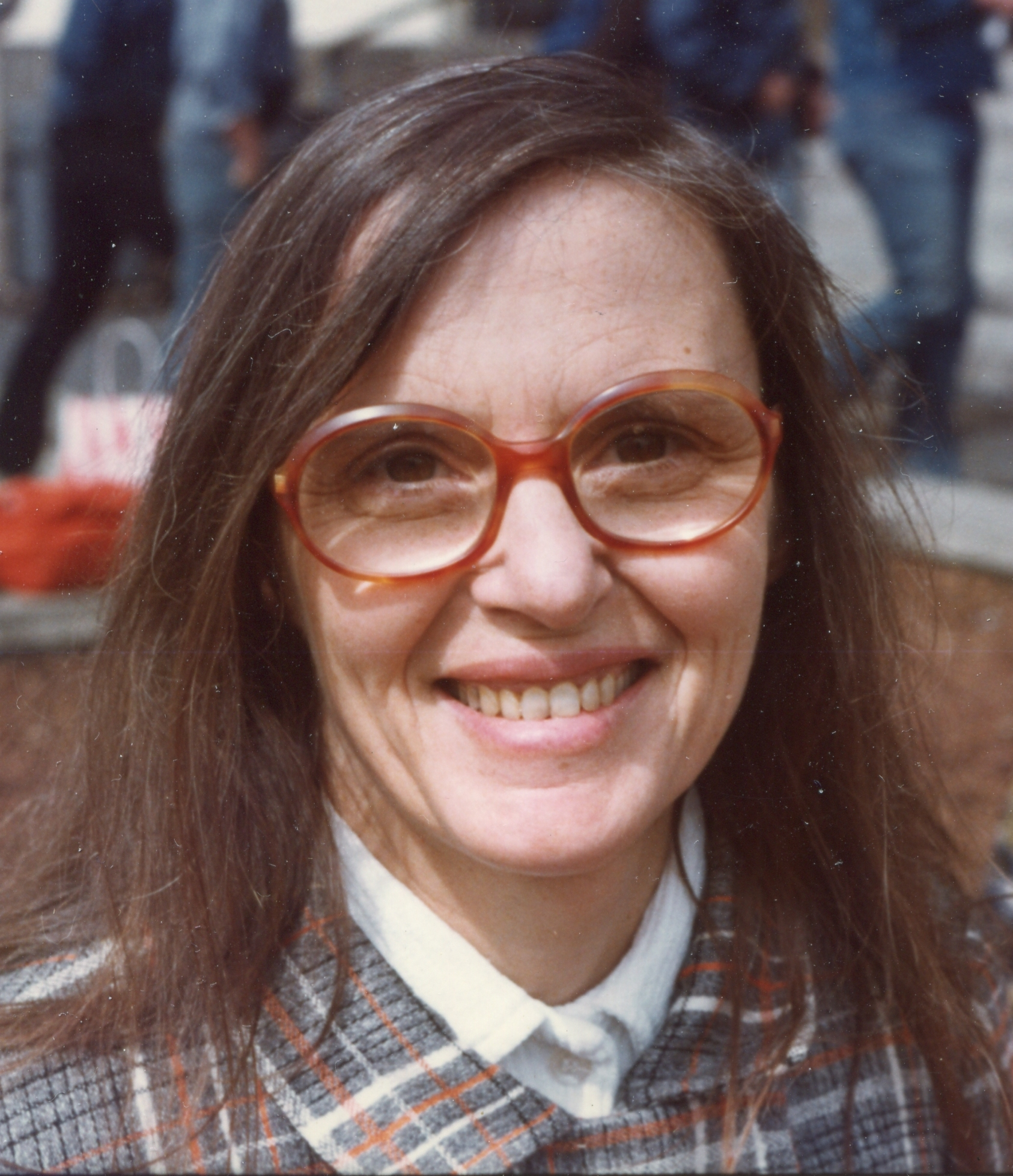
- Choquet-Bruhat in 1974
- Born: Yvonne Suzanne Marie-Louise Bruhat; 29 December 1923; Lille, France
- Died: 11 February 2025 (aged 101); Mérignac, France
- Other name: Yvonne Fourès-Bruhat
- Education: École normale supérieure; CNRS
- Known for: Well-posedness of the vacuum Einstein field equations
- Spouses: Léonce Fourès (m. 1947; div. 1960); Gustave Choquet (died 2006)
- Children: 3, including Daniel
- Father: Georges Bruhat
- Awards: Grand Officier of the Légion d'honneur; Elected to the French Academy of Sciences; Elected to the American Academy of Arts and Sciences
- Scientific career
- Fields: Mathematical physics
- Workplaces: Pierre and Marie Curie University
- Thesis: Théorème d'existence pour certains systèmes d'équations aux dérivées partielles non linéaires (1951)
- Doctoral advisor: André Lichnerowicz
- Other academic advisors: Jean Leray

Signature
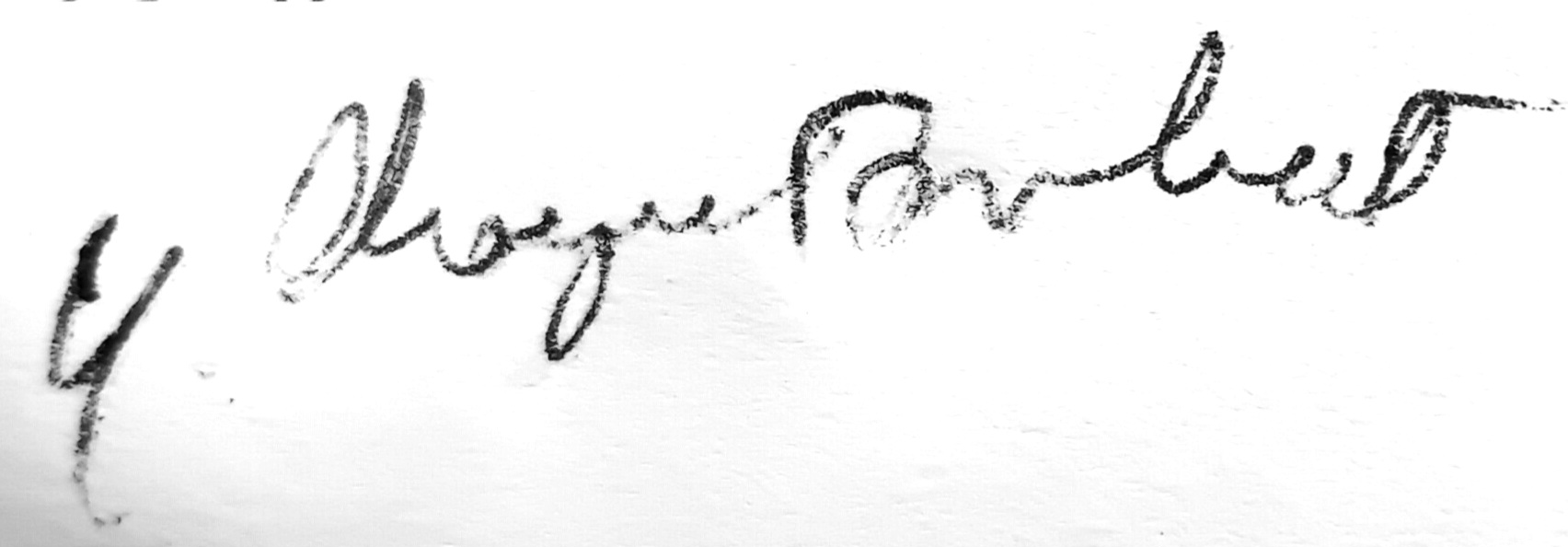

Yvonne Choquet-Bruhat (French: [ivɔn ʃɔkɛ bʁy.a]; 29 December 1923 – 11 February 2025) was a French mathematical physicist now best remembered for her investigation of the mathematics of general relativity. Her proof that the Einstein field equations can be expressed as a well-posed initial-value problem was listed by the journal Classical and Quantum Gravity as one of thirteen "milestone" results in general relativity in an issue published in the centennial anniversary of its birth in 2015. She also studied non-Abelian gauge theory, relativistic hydrodynamics, and supergravity.

Choquet-Bruhat was the first woman to be elected to the French Academy of Sciences and was a Grand Officer of the Legion of Honour.

== Early life and education ==
Yvonne Bruhat was born in Lille on 29 December 1923 in an intellectual family. Her mother was philosophy professor Berthe Hubert and her father was physicist Georges Bruhat, who died in 1945 in the Sachsenhausen concentration camp. He was sent there after refusing to divulge information on the French Resistance to Nazi occupation. Her brother François Bruhat also became a mathematician.

Bruhat attended secondary school in Paris, earning her Baccalauréat in 1941, at the top of her class. She received the silver medal for physics in the prestigious Concours Général national competition. In her view, mathematics and the natural sciences were the best ways to understand the Universe. Uncertain whether to study medicine, physics, or mathematics, she decided on the last. She wanted to research rather than teach, as was more usual for women at the time. From 1943 to 1946 she studied at the École normale supérieure de jeunes filles (a girls' school, also known as the École normale de Sèvres) near Paris.

== Career ==
From 1946 to 1949, she was an assistant at the École normale supérieure. In 1947, Bruhat undertook research under the supervision of mathematical physicist André Lichnerowicz, who invited her to be his doctoral student after seeing her excellent marks on an examination for future high-school teachers. But unlike most mathematicians at the time, she did not want to follow the trend towards increasing abstraction and preferred to remain close to physics, motivated by her desire to better understand nature. Jean Leray, an expert on the theory of partial differential equations, suggested that she investigate whether or not the Einstein field equations of general relativity were well-posed. This became the topic of her dissertation, for which she earned her doctorate in 1951. While it was known that the equations of motion derived from Newton's laws of motion and gravitation yielded unique solutions with initial conditions, whether this was true for Einstein's gravitational field equations remained unproven until her landmark thesis.

Her work guaranteed the predictability of the universe as described by general relativity. Her work also lent credence to gravitational waves, predicted by general relativity, but initially doubted by Einstein, who thought that they were merely a mathematical artefact of coordinate choices. In two papers published in 1916 and 1918, Einstein had only shown that waves were solutions to the linearized gravitational field equations. Bruhat demonstrated that this was also true for the fully non-linear equations. She expressed the Einstein field equations in vacuum using harmonic coordinates, previously introduced by Théophile De Donder and Cornelius Lanczos, in which case they become non-linear hyperbolic partial differential equations, and as such could describe the propagation of waves. While Georges Darmois had already tackled the problem for analytic solutions, Bruhat's proof applied to non-analytic cases as well.

She also showed that gravitational waves could not propagate at an arbitrary speed; they must travel at the speed of light in vacuum. Causality was therefore not violated. With the 2017 detection of both gravitational and electromagnetic waves from GW170817, the merger of two neutron stars in the galaxy NGC 4993, Bruhat's faith in her mathematical work was vindicated by multi-messenger astronomy.

With some help from Leray, Bruhat and her first husband, Léonce Fourès, were offered fellowships at the Institute for Advanced Study (IAS) in Princeton, New Jersey, in the academic year 1951–51. During her time there, she met a number of scientific luminaries, including the Institute director, J. Robert Oppenheimer, former scientific director of the Manhattan Project, John Archibald Wheeler, who became her friend, and John von Neumann, who showed her an early electronic computer he built called the IAS machine. She also met Albert Einstein, father of general relativity, whom she remembered as a kind and friendly man. She presented her work to him on his blackboard. She described this as a happy time in her life. After their time at the IAS, she and her husband accepted positions at the University of Marseille.

While a number of solutions to the Einstein field equations had already been obtained, her contributions to the mathematics of general relativity stimulated interest in the topic among mathematicians. Her dissertation showed that general relativity could be handled with mathematical rigour and became the basis for future studies on the mathematics of general relativity. In the long run, it also facilitated the development of numerical relativity, making it possible to run computer simulations of the motion of two bodies (such as black holes and other compact objects in a binary system), their merger, and the gravitational waves they emit during the process. In 2005, Frans Pretorius successfully wrote the first computer simulation of two merging black holes based on Choquet-Bruhat's work, in particular, her use of harmonic coordinates. Simulations of this kind were used in analysing the first detection of gravitational waves in 2015. Along with other key figures such as Wheeler, Peter Bergmann, and Dennis Sciama, her studies and collaborations spurred the revival and growth of research in general relativity during the second half of the 1950s. She attended the Conference on the Role of Gravitation in Physics in Chapel Hill, North Carolina, in 1957. This conference marked the beginning of the renaissance of general relativity after the Second World War. The International Society on General Relativity and Gravitation (ISGRG) was formed 14 years later. Bruhat served its president from 1980 to 1983.

In 1958, she was awarded the CNRS Silver Medal. From 1958 to 1959 she taught at the University of Reims. In 1960 relocated to the Sorbonne in Paris. When this was later reorganized, she moved to Paris VI (later the Pierre and Marie Curie University or UPMC), and remained there until her retirement in 1990. Afterward, she occupied a position to the Institute for Higher Scientific Studies (IHÉS). At the UPMC she continued to make significant contributions to mathematical physics, notably in general relativity, supergravity, and the non-Abelian gauge theories of the Standard Model of particle physics.

During the 1950s and 1960s, she generalized the main result of her doctoral dissertation to cases of the Einstein field equations in the presence of various types of matter. In 1969 she and Robert Geroch introduced the notion of maximal Cauchy development, important in the study of global aspects of the Cauchy problem in general relativity and the theorems on gravitational singularities of Roger Penrose and Stephen Hawking. In 1976, she and Jerrold Marsden proved the positive-mass theorem for the case of a vacuum flat spacetime near Minkowski. With Cécile DeWitt-Morette and Margaret Dillard-Bleick, she published monograph titled Analysis, Manifolds and Physics, detailing the relevance of global analysis for physics. Her work in 1981 with Demetrios Christodoulou demonstrated the existence of global solutions of the Yang–Mills, Higgs, and spinor field equations in 3+1 dimensions. In 1984 she examined results in supergravity that can be extended to 11 dimensions.

In 1978 Yvonne Choquet-Bruhat was elected a correspondent to the Academy of Sciences and on 14 May 1979 became the first woman to be elected a full member. In 1985 she was elected to the American Academy of Arts and Sciences. In 1986 she was chosen to deliver the prestigious Noether Lecture by the Association for Women in Mathematics. In 2006, she delivered a talk titled "Results and Open Problems in Mathematical General Relativity" at the International Congress of Mathematicians in Madrid. In 2011, she exhibited a simplified version of (spinorial) proof of the positive-energy theorem by Edward Witten, valid for any number of dimensions. She completed her last technical book, Introduction to General Relativity, Black Holes & Cosmology, in 2014.

== Technical research contributions ==
Choquet-Bruhat's best-known research deals with the mathematical nature of the initial data formulation of general relativity. A summary of results can be phrased purely in terms of standard differential geometric objects.

- An initial data set is a triplet (M, g, k) in which M is a three-dimensional smooth manifold, g is a smooth Riemannian metric on M, and k is a smooth (0,2)-tensor field on M.
- Given an initial data set (M, g, k), a development of (M, g, k) is a four-dimensional Lorentzian manifold (M̅, g̅) together with a smooth embedding f : M → M̅ and a smooth unit normal vector field along f such that f^{*}g̅ = g and such that the second fundamental form of f, relative to the given normal vector field, is k.

In this sense, an initial data set can be viewed as the prescription of the submanifold geometry of an embedded spacelike hypersurface in a Lorentzian manifold.

- An initial data set (M, g, k) satisfies the vacuum constraint equations, or is said to be a vacuum initial data set, if the following two equations are satisfied:

$$\begin{align}
R_g-|k|_g^2+(\operatorname{tr}_gk)^2&=0\\
\operatorname{div}_gk-d(\operatorname{tr}_gk)&=0.
\end{align}$$

Here R_{g} denotes the scalar curvature of g.

One of Choquet-Bruhat's seminal 1952 results states the following:

Every vacuum initial data set (M, g, k) has a development f : M → (M̅, g̅) such that g̅ has zero Ricci curvature, and such that every inextendible timelike curve in the Lorentzian manifold (M̅, g̅) intersects f(M) exactly once.

Briefly, this can be summarized as saying that there exists a vacuum spacetime (M̅, g̅) for which f(M) is a Cauchy surface. Such a development is called a globally hyperbolic vacuum development. Choquet-Bruhat also proved a uniqueness theorem:

Given any two globally hyperbolic vacuum developments f_{1} : M → (M̅_{1}, g̅_{1}) and f_{2} : M → (M̅_{2}, g̅_{2}) of the same vacuum initial data set, there is an open subset U_{1} of M̅_{1} containing f_{1}(M) and an open subset U_{2} of M̅_{2} containing f_{2}(M), together with an isometry i : (U_{1}, g̅_{1}) → (U_{2}, g̅_{2}) such that i(f_{1}(p)) = f_{2}(p) for all p in M.

In a slightly imprecise form, this says: given any embedded spacelike hypersurface M of a Ricci-flat Lorentzian manifold M̅, the geometry of M̅ near M is fully determined by the submanifold geometry of M.

In an article written with Robert Geroch in 1969, Choquet-Bruhat fully clarified the nature of uniqueness. With a two-page argument in point-set topology using Zorn's lemma, they showed that Choquet-Bruhat's above existence and uniqueness theorems automatically imply a global uniqueness theorem:

Any vacuum initial data set (M, g, k) has a maximal globally hyperbolic vacuum development, meaning a globally hyperbolic vacuum development f : M → (M̅, g̅) such that, for any other globally hyperbolic vacuum development f_{1} : M → (M̅_{1}, g̅_{1}), there is an open subset U of M̅ containing f(M) and an isometry i : M̅_{1} → U such that i(f_{1}(p)) = f(p) for all p in M.

Any two maximal globally hyperbolic vacuum developments of the same vacuum initial data are isometric to one another.

It is now common to study such developments. For instance, the well-known theorem of Demetrios Christodoulou and Sergiu Klainerman on stability of Minkowski space asserts that if (ℝ^{3}, g, k) is a vacuum initial data set with g and k sufficiently close to zero (in a certain precise form), then its maximal globally hyperbolic vacuum development is geodesically complete and geometrically close to Minkowski space.

Choquet-Bruhat's proof makes use of a clever choice of coordinates, the wave coordinates (which are the Lorentzian equivalent to the harmonic coordinates), in which the Einstein equations become a system of hyperbolic partial differential equations, for which well-posedness results can be applied.

== Personal life and death ==
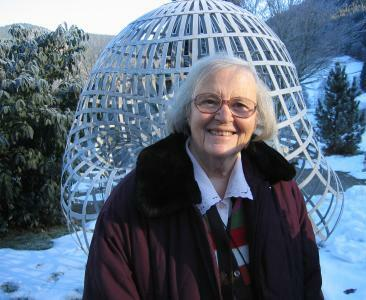
Choquet-Bruhat in 2006

In 1947, she married fellow mathematician Léonce Fourès. Their daughter Michelle is an ecologist. Her doctoral work and early research was under the name Yvonne Fourès-Bruhat. In 1960, Bruhat and Fourès divorced.

The following year she married the mathematician Gustave Choquet and changed her last name to Choquet-Bruhat. She and Choquet had two children: a son, neuroscientist Daniel, and a daughter, medical doctor Geneviève.

Her memoir, from her academic and personal life, was translated into English in 2018.

Choquet-Bruhat died on 11 February 2025 in Merignac, France (33700), at the age of 101.

== Major publications ==
Articles

- Y. Fourès-Bruhat (1951). "Théorème d'existence pour certains systèmes d'équations aux dérivées partielles non linéaires". Acta Mathematica. 88: 141–225. doi:10.1007/bf02392131. Zbl 0049.19201. Wikidata Q56048465.
- Choquet-Bruhat, Yvonne; Geroch, Robert. Global aspects of the Cauchy problem in general relativity. Comm. Math. Phys. 14 (1969), 329–335. doi:10.1007/BF01645389 MR 0250640

Survey articles

- Bruhat, Yvonne. The Cauchy problem. Gravitation: An introduction to current research, pp. 130–168, Wiley, New York, 1962.
- Choquet-Bruhat, Yvonne; York, James W. Jr. The Cauchy problem. General relativity and gravitation, Vol. 1, pp. 99–172, Plenum, New York-London, 1980.
- Choquet-Bruhat, Yvonne. Positive-energy theorems. Relativity, groups and topology, II (Les Houches, 1983), 739–785, North-Holland, Amsterdam, 1984.
- Choquet-Bruhat, Yvonne. Results and open problems in mathematical general relativity. Milan J. Math. 75 (2007), 273–289.
- Choquet-Bruhat, Yvonne. Beginnings of the Cauchy problem for Einstein's field equations. Surveys in differential geometry 2015. One hundred years of general relativity, 1–16, Surv. Differ. Geom., 20, Int. Press, Boston, MA, 2015.

Technical books

- Choquet-Bruhat, Yvonne; DeWitt-Morette, Cécile; Dillard-Bleick, Margaret. Analysis, manifolds and physics. Second edition. North-Holland Publishing Co., Amsterdam-New York, 1982. xx+630 pp. ISBN 0-444-86017-7
- Choquet-Bruhat, Yvonne; DeWitt-Morette, Cécile. Analysis, manifolds and physics. Part II. North-Holland Publishing Co., Amsterdam, 1989. xii+449 pp. ISBN 0-444-87071-7
- Choquet-Bruhat, Y. Distributions. (French) Théorie et problèmes. Masson et Cie, Éditeurs, Paris, 1973. x+232 pp.
- Choquet-Bruhat, Yvonne. General relativity and the Einstein equations. Oxford Mathematical Monographs. Oxford University Press, Oxford, 2009. xxvi+785 pp. ISBN 978-0-19-923072-3
- Choquet-Bruhat, Y. Géométrie différentielle et systèmes extérieurs. Préface de A. Lichnerowicz. Monographies Universitaires de Mathématiques, No. 28 Dunod, Paris 1968 xvii+328 pp.
- Choquet-Bruhat, Yvonne. Graded bundles and supermanifolds. Monographs and Textbooks in Physical Science. Lecture Notes, 12. Bibliopolis, Naples, 1989. xii+94 pp. ISBN 88-7088-223-3
- Choquet-Bruhat, Yvonne. Introduction to general relativity, black holes, and cosmology. With a foreword by Thibault Damour. Oxford University Press, Oxford, 2015. xx+279 pp. ISBN 978-0-19-966645-4, 978-0-19-966646-1
- Choquet-Bruhat, Y. Problems and solutions in mathematical physics. Translated from the French by C. Peltzer. Translation editor, J.J. Brandstatter Holden-Day, Inc., San Francisco, Calif.-London-Amsterdam 1967 x+315 pp.

Popular book

- Choquet-Bruhat, Yvonne. A lady mathematician in this strange universe: memoirs. Translated from the 2016 French original. World Scientific Publishing Co. Pte. Ltd., Hackensack, NJ, 2018. x+351 pp. ISBN 978-981-3231-62-7

Celebratio Mathematica records 250 publications by Choquet-Bruhat

== Honours and awards ==
- Médaille d'Argent du Centre National de la Recherche Scientifique, 1958
- Prix Henri de Parville of the Académie des Sciences, 1963
- Member (since 1965), Comite International de Relativite Generale et Gravitation (President 1980–1983)
- Member, Académie des Sciences, Paris (elected 1979)
- Elected to the American Academy of Arts and Sciences 1985
- Association for Women in Mathematics Noether Lecturer, 1986
- Commandeur de la Légion d'honneur, 1997
- Dannie Heineman Prize for Mathematical Physics, 2003
- She was elevated to the 'Grand Officier' and 'Grand Croix' dignities in the Légion d'Honneur in 2008.

In 2026, Choquet-Bruhat was announced as one of 72 historical women in STEM whose names are proposed to be added to the 72 men already celebrated on the Eiffel Tower. Anne Hidalgo, the Mayor of Paris, announced this on the recommendation of a committee led by Isabelle Vauglin of Femmes et Sciences and Jean-François Martins, which represents the operating company that manages the Eiffel Tower.
