= François Bruhat =

French mathematician (1929–2007)

- Born: François Georges René Bruhat; 8 April 1929; Paris, France
- Died: 17 July 2007 (aged 78); Paris, France
- Education: École normale supérieure
- Known for: Bruhat decomposition Bruhat order Schwartz–Bruhat function
- Father: Georges Bruhat
- Family: Yvonne Choquet-Bruhat (sister)
- Scientific career
- Fields: Mathematics

François Georges René Bruhat (French: [bʁy.a]; 8 April 1929 – 17 July 2007) was a French mathematician who worked on algebraic groups. The Bruhat order of a Weyl group, the Bruhat decomposition, and the Schwartz–Bruhat functions are named after him.

He was the son of physicist (and associate director of the École Normale Supérieure during the occupation) Georges Bruhat, and brother of physicist Yvonne Choquet-Bruhat.

== See also ==
- Hadamard space

== Bibliography ==
- O'Connor, John J.; Robertson, Edmund F., "François Bruhat", MacTutor History of Mathematics Archive, University of St Andrews
