= Reeb =

Reeb may refer to:

== People ==
- David Reeb (born 1952), Israeli artist
- Georges Reeb (1920–1993), French mathematician
- James Reeb (1927–1965) American civil rights activist
- Jörg Reeb (born 1972), German footballer
- Larry Reeb, American stand-up comedian
- Troy Reeb (born 1969), Canadian journalist

== Products ==
- Reeb (beer)

== Mathematics ==
- Reeb foliation
- Reeb graph
- Reeb sphere theorem
- Reeb stability theorem
- Reeb vector field
