= Haefliger (disambiguation) =

Haefliger may refer to the following people:

- André Haefliger (1929-2023), Swiss mathematician
- Andreas Haefliger (born 1962), Swiss pianist, son of Ernst
- Ernst Haefliger (1919–2007), Swiss tenor
- Fred Haefliger (1892–1988), United States Marine Corps in World War I
- Michael Haefliger (born 1961), Swiss art administrator
- Othmar Haefliger (born 1963), Swiss cyclist
- Paul Haefliger (1914–1982), Swiss-Australian painter

Haefliger may also refer to:

- Haefliger structure in mathematics
