= Paul Farahvar =

American stand-up comedian

- Born: Philadelphia, Pennsylvania, U.S.

Comedy career
- Medium: Stand-up, podcasting, actor, attorney

Paul Farahvar is an American stand-up comedian, podcaster, actor, and attorney. He is known for performing regularly at comedy venues such as the Laugh Factory and Zanies Comedy Club.

== Life and career ==
Paul was born in Philadelphia, Pennsylvania. He received his bachelor's degree from the University of Illinois at Urbana-Champaign and then received his Juris Doctor degree from University of Illinois College of Law. In 2012, he was voted the "40 under 40" by the Chicago Lawyer Magazine. His career as a standup comedian started after meeting Bob Saget. He is also a regular guest host on WGN radio. He was the runner-up in the Chicago Reader for “Best Stand-up Comedian” (2021), and was voted "Top 40 Up and Coming Comedians" in 2017.

Paul's Dry Bar special "Always a Groomsman" was released by Angel Studios. In April 2024, his special "Middle Eastern, Middle Western" was released by Helium Comedy. He recently performed at the Halifax Comedy Festival. .

== Filmography ==
As Actor

- 2015 - GIF: It's Pronounced Gif
- 2016 - RossFit
- 2017 - Chicago Med
- 2022 - Visiting Friends

As Writer

- 2016 - RossFit
