= Jacques Feldbau =

French mathematician (1914–1945)

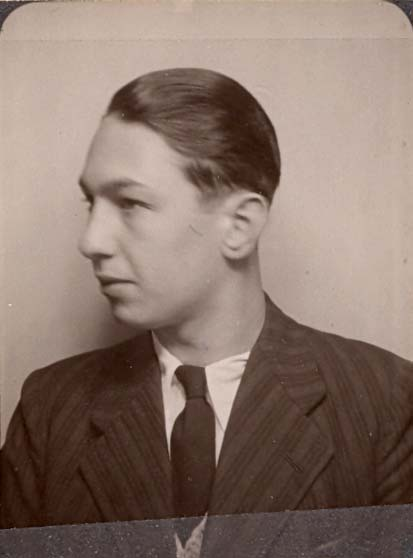
- Born: 22 October 1914; Straßburg, Alsace-Lorraine, German Empire (today Strasbourg, Alsace, France)
- Died: 22 April 1945 (aged 30); Ganacker, subcamp of Flossenbürg concentration camp, Germany
- Education: University of Straßburg
- Known for: Feldbau's theorem: a fiber bundle over a simplex is trivializable
- Scientific career
- Fields: Mathematics
- Doctoral advisor: Charles Ehresmann

Jacques Feldbau was a French mathematician, born on 22 October 1914 in Strasbourg, of an Alsatian Jewish traditionalist family. He died on 22 April 1945 at the Ganacker Camp, annex of the concentration camp of Flossenbürg in Germany. As a mathematician he worked on differential geometry and topology.

He was the first student of Charles Ehresmann. He is known as one of the founders of the theory of fiber bundles. He is the one who first proved that a fiber bundle over a simplex is trivializable and who used this to classify bundles over spheres.

In a paper, written together with Ehresmann, he introduced the notion of an associated bundle and proved results known today as the exact homotopy sequence of a fibration.

== Biography ==
=== Childhood and education ===
Described by Michèle Audin as "a handsome young man with a very friendly and likeable personality" he demonstrated an early interest in mathematics, whilst also being enthusiastic about music and sport. He studied at the Lycée Fustel de Coulanges in Strasbourg, receiving his high school diploma in 1932, and then he started preparatory classes at Lycée Kléber. He applied for the École normale supérieure but refused to present himself on Saturday (the Jewish sabbath), and so was not allowed to continue. He enrolled at the University of Strasbourg in 1934, where he was librarian of the Institute of Mathematics in 1935. He joined the CNRS and began preparing a PhD under the direction of Charles Ehresmann in 1939. He was also a pianist and swimmer. becoming a university butterfly-stroke champion in 1939. As soon as the 1930s, Feldbau was participating in a "defence group against anti-Semitism."

=== World War II ===
Mobilized in 1939, he became a flying officer in the French Air Force. Demobilized after the armistice of 22 June 1940, he was appointed associate professor at the School of Chateauroux, but was forbidden to teach by the laws of exclusions of 3 October 1940 on the status of Jews, promulgated by the Vichy regime under the Pétain government. He then went to Clermont-Ferrand, where the University of Strasbourg had been evacuated to, where he met his supervisor, Charles Ehresmann. In order to earn a living he gave mathematics lessons and continued his research in topology for his doctoral thesis; he also became a member of the Resistance movement. The status of Jews was one of the additional burdens of Nazi occupation; it quickly became impossible for a scientist labelled as "non- Aryan " to publish under his name. Michèle Audin showed a note to the Proceedings of the Academy of Science, starting with his signature and that of Charles Ehresmann. It was eventually published under the sole name of Ehresmann albeit with mention of the results being obtained "in collaboration with one of his students". Jacques Feldbau subsequently published two short notes in the Bulletin de la Société Mathématique de France under the pseudonym "Jacques Laboureur" or "Jacques Ploughman". (The name "Feldbau" in German means "agriculture".)

Closer to the war, a very gifted student, Jacques Feldbau, asked me to suggest a topic in topology. I consulted Ehresmann, who was far better versed in the field than I. Following his advice, I suggested to Feldbau that he study the notion of fiber bundles, which was still quite young. Despite his somewhat clumsy methods (hardly surprising in a beginner) he came up with some interesting results...

— André Weil, The Apprenticeship of a Mathematician, p. 112

=== Arrest, deportation and death ===
On the night of 24 to 25 June 1943 the "roundup of Gallia" took place whereby 38 Strasbourg university students were arrested in the Gallia university foyer in retaliation for three attacks against the Germans, following the execution on 24 June of two members of the Gestapo in the house of a resistance member, Professor Jean-Michel Flandin. Feldbau himself was not present in the house, but was arrested on 25 June in the morning, when he went to collect his PhD thesis. He was transferred to Drancy and then deported to Auschwitz, by train No. 60 of 7 October 1943, where he arrived on 10 October. The testimonies of survivors show the moral strength and support he brought to his companions. His mastery of several languages was a great help to him. He would have held seminars in mathematics on Sunday afternoon and a conference on quantum theory.

On 16 January 1945, the camp was evacuated by the SS for death marches westward. Feldbau died of exhaustion in camp Ganacker, in Bavaria, two weeks before the end of the war.

His remains were repatriated in 1957 by his sister, and he was reinterred in Cronenbourg.

== His mathematical work ==
At the instigation of Charles Ehresmann he conducted crucial work in algebraic topology and specifically on fiber spaces. Amongst its key findings, we note the following fundamental theorem: "a fiber space of a simplex is trivializable "and its corollary, "to give a bundle on a sphere $S^n$ is equivalent to giving a mapping from $S^{n-1}$ in the group of automorphisms of the fiber." These results are so obvious now among the specialists in algebraic topology that their origin is somewhat forgotten, writes André Weil, in the comments of his collected works. A note to the Proceedings of the Academy of Sciences, co-authored with Charles Ehresmann, outlines what was later called the homotopy exact sequence of fiber bundles.

The posthumous papers of Feldbau, published by Ehresmann in 1958, also include work on homotopy groups of higher order, later recovered, and overtaken by J. H. C. Whitehead, with whom he and Ehresmann were competing. His difficult working conditions and his tragic fate have overshadowed his contributions to mathematics, but his contributions are recognized by recent work on the history of the topology.

== See also ==
- Fiber bundle
- Seifert fiber space
