= Gâteaux =

Gâteaux may refer to:

- plural of gâteau, meaning cake
- René Gateaux (1889–1914), a French mathematician
  - Gateaux derivative, mathematical concept
