= Charles Ehresmann =

French mathematician (1905–1979)

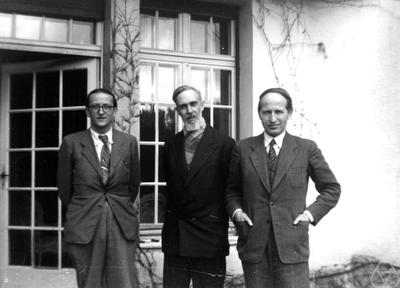
- Charles Ehresmann (right) at the topology conference 1949 in Oberwolfach, together with Paul Vincensini (middle) and Georges Reeb (left)
- Born: 19 April 1905; Straßburg, Alsace-Lorraine, German Empire (today Strasbourg, Alsace, France)
- Died: 22 September 1979 (aged 74); Amiens, Picardy, France
- Education: École Normale Supérieure
- Known for: Almost complex manifold Ehresmann's fibration theorem Ehresmann connection Jet bundle Lie groupoid Sketch; Strict 2-category
- Spouse: Andrée Ehresmann
- Awards: Prix Francoeur
- Scientific career
- Fields: Mathematics
- Workplaces: University of Strasbourg; Paris Diderot University
- Thesis: Sur la topologie de certains espaces homogènes (1934)
- Doctoral advisor: Élie Cartan
- Doctoral students: Jean Bénabou; Jacques Feldbau; André Haefliger; Paulette Libermann; Nguyen Dinh Ngoc; Valentin Poénaru; Georges Reeb; Wu Wen-Tsün

Charles Ehresmann (19 April 1905 – 22 September 1979) was a German-born French mathematician who worked in differential topology and category theory.

He was an early member of the Bourbaki group, and is known for his work on the differential geometry of smooth fiber bundles, notably the introduction of the concepts of Ehresmann connection and of jet bundles, and for his seminar on category theory.

== Life ==
Ehresmann was born in Strasbourg (at the time part of the German Empire) to an Alsatian-speaking family; his father was a gardener. After World War I, Alsace returned part of France and Ehresmann was taught in French at Lycée Kléber.

Between 1924 and 1927 he studied at the École Normale Supérieure (ENS) in Paris and obtained agrégation in mathematics. After one year of military service, in 1928-29 he taught at a French school in Rabat, Morocco. He studied further at the University of Göttingen during the years 1930–31, and at Princeton University in 1932–34.

He completed his PhD thesis entitled Sur la topologie de certains espaces homogènes (On the topology of certain homogeneous spaces) at ENS in 1934 under the supervision of Élie Cartan.

From 1935 to 1939 he was a researcher with the Centre national de la recherche scientifique and he contributed to the seminar of Gaston Julia, which was a forerunner of the Bourbaki seminar. In 1939 Ehresmann became a lecturer at the University of Strasbourg, but one year later the whole faculty was evacuated to Clermont-Ferrand due to the German occupation of France. When Germany withdrew in 1945, he returned to Strasbourg.

From 1955 he was Professor of Topology at Sorbonne, and after it split into multiple universities in 1969 he ended up at Paris Diderot University (Paris 7).

Ehresmann was President of the Société Mathématique de France in 1965. He was awarded in 1940 the Prix Francoeur for young researchers in mathematics and in 1967 an honorary doctorate by the University of Bologna. He also held visiting chairs at Yale University, Princeton University, in Brazil (São Paulo, Rio de Janeiro), Buenos Aires, Mexico City, Montreal, and the Tata Institute of Fundamental Research in Bombay.

After his retirement in 1975 and until 1978 he gave lectures at the University of Picardy at Amiens, where he moved because his second wife, Andrée Charles-Ehresmann, was a professor of mathematics there. He died at Amiens in 1979.

== Mathematical work ==
In the first part of his career Ehresmann introduced many new mathematical objects in differential geometry and topology, which gave rise to entire new fields, often developed later by his students.

In his first works he investigated the topology and homology of manifolds associated with classical Lie groups, such as Grassmann manifolds and other homogeneous spaces.

He developed the concept of fiber bundle, and the related notions of Ehresmann connection and solder form, building on the works by Herbert Seifert and Hassler Whitney in the 1930s. Norman Steenrod was working in the same direction from a topological point of view, but Ehresmann, influenced by Cartan's ideas, was particularly interested in differentiable (smooth) fiber bundles, and in the differential-geometric aspects of these. This approach led him also to the notion of almost complex structure, which was introduced independently also by Heinz Hopf.

In order to obtain a more conceptual understanding of completely integrable systems of partial differential equations, in 1944 Ehresmann inaugurated the theory of foliations, which will be later developed by his student Georges Reeb. With the same perspective, he pioneered the notions of jet and of Lie groupoid.

Since the 1960s, Ehresmann's research interests moved to category theory, where he introduced the concepts of sketch, of multiplicative graph, and of strict 2-category.

His collected works, edited by his wife, appeared in seven volumes in 1980–1983 (four volumes published by Imprimerie Evrard, Amiens, and the rest in the journal Cahiers de Topologie et Géométrie Différentielle Catégoriques, which he had founded in 1957). His publications include also the books Catégories et structures (Dunod, Paris, 1965) and Algèbre (1969).

Jean Dieudonné described Ehresmann's personality as "... distinguished by forthrightness, simplicity, and total absence of conceit or careerism. As a teacher he was outstanding, not so much for the brilliance of his lectures as for the inspiration and tireless guidance he generously gave to his research students ... "

He had 76 PhD students, including Georges Reeb, Wu Wenjun (吴文俊), André Haefliger, Valentin Poénaru, and Daniel Tanré. His first student was Jacques Feldbau.
