= Vincensini =

Vincensini is a surname. Notable people with the surname include:

- Paul Vincensini (1896–1978), French mathematician
- Thomas Vincensini (born 1993), French footballer
