= Eells–Kuiper manifold =

In mathematics, an Eells–Kuiper manifold is a compactification of $\R^n$ by a sphere of dimension $n/2$, where $n=2,4,8$, or $16$. It is named after James Eells and Nicolaas Kuiper.

If $n=2$, the Eells–Kuiper manifold is diffeomorphic to the real projective plane $\mathbb{RP}^2$. For $n\ge 4$ it is simply-connected and has the integral cohomology structure of the complex projective plane $\mathbb{CP}^2$ ($n = 4$), of the quaternionic projective plane $\mathbb{HP}^2$ ($n = 8$) or of the Cayley projective plane ($n = 16$).

== Properties ==
These manifolds are important in both Morse theory and foliation theory:

Theorem: Let $M$ be a connected closed manifold (not necessarily orientable) of dimension $n$. Suppose $M$ admits a Morse function $f\colon M\to \R$ of class $C^3$ with exactly three singular points. Then $M$ is a Eells–Kuiper manifold.

Theorem: Let $M^n$ be a compact connected manifold and $F$ a Morse foliation on $M$. Suppose the number of centers $c$ of the foliation $F$ is more than the number of saddles $s$. Then there are two possibilities:

- $c=s+2$, and $M^n$ is homeomorphic to the sphere $S^n$,
- $c=s+1$, and $M^n$ is an Eells–Kuiper manifold, $n=2,4,8$ or $16$.

== See also ==
- Reeb sphere theorem
