= Morse–Smale system =

In dynamical systems theory, an area of pure mathematics, a Morse–Smale system is a smooth dynamical system whose non-wandering set consists of finitely many hyperbolic equilibrium points and hyperbolic periodic orbits and satisfying a transversality condition on the stable and unstable manifolds. Morse–Smale systems are structurally stable and form one of the simplest and best studied classes of smooth dynamical systems. They are named after Marston Morse, the creator of the Morse theory, and Stephen Smale, who emphasized their importance for smooth dynamics and algebraic topology.

== Definition ==
Consider a smooth and complete vector field X defined on a compact differentiable manifold M with dimension n. The flow defined by this vector field is a Morse-Smale system if

1. X has only a finite number of singular points (i.e. equilibrium points of the flow), and all of them are hyperbolic equilibrium points.
2. X has only a finite number of periodic orbits, and all of them are hyperbolic periodic orbits.
3. The limit sets of all orbits of X tends to a singular point or a periodic orbit.
4. The stable and unstable manifolds of the singular points and periodic orbits intersect transversely. In other words, if $x_i$ is a singular point (or periodic orbit) and $W_s(x_i)$ (respectively, $W_u(x_i)$) its stable (respectively, unstable) manifold, then $w \in W_s(x_i) \cap W_u(x_j)$ implies that the corresponding tangent spaces of the stable and unstable manifold satisfy $T_w(W_s(x_i)) + T_w(W_u(x_j)) = T_w(M)$.

== Examples ==
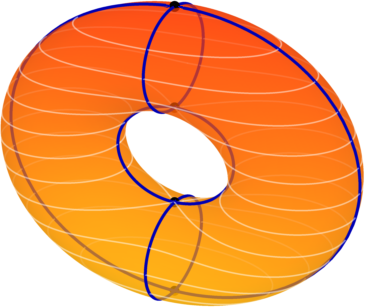
Flow lines on an upright torus: the stable and unstable manifolds of the saddle points do not intersect transversely, so the height function does not satisfy the Morse-Smale condition.

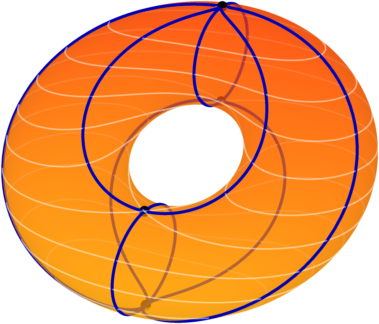
Flow lines on a tilted torus: the height function satisfies the Morse-Smale condition.

- Any Morse function f on a compact Riemannian manifold M defines a gradient vector field. If one imposes the condition that the unstable and stable manifolds of the critical points intersect transversely, then the gradient vector field and the corresponding smooth flow form a Morse–Smale system. The finite set of critical points of f forms the non-wandering set, which consists entirely of fixed points.
- Gradient-like dynamical systems are a particular case of Morse–Smale systems.
- For Morse–Smale systems on the 2D-sphere all equilibrium points and periodical orbits are hyperbolic; there are no separatrice loops.

== Properties ==
- By Peixoto's theorem, the vector field on a 2D manifold is structurally stable if and only if this field is Morse-Smale.
- Consider a Morse-Smale system defined on compact differentiable manifold M with dimension n, and let the index of an equilibrium point (or a periodic orbit) be defined as the dimension of its associated unstable manifold. In Morse-Smale systems, the indices of the equilibrium points (and periodic orbits) are related with the topology of M by the Morse-Smale inequalities. Precisely, define m_{i} as the sum of the number of equilibrium points with index i and the number of periodic orbits with indices i and i + 1, and b_{i} as the i-th Betti number of M. Then the following inequalities are valid:

$$\sum_{j=0}^i (-1)^j m_{i-j} \ge \sum_{j=0}^i (-1)^j b_{i-j}, \quad i = 0, \ldots, n$$
