= Sketch (mathematics) =

In the mathematical theory of categories, a sketch is a category D, together with a set of cones intended to be limits and a set of cocones intended to be colimits. A model of the sketch in a category C is a functor

$$M:D\rightarrow C$$

that takes each specified cone to a limit cone in C and each specified cocone to a colimit cocone in C. Morphisms of models are natural transformations. Sketches are a general way of specifying structures on the objects of a category, forming a category-theoretic analog to the logical concept of a theory and its models. They allow multisorted models and models in any category.

Sketches were invented in 1968 by Charles Ehresmann, using a different but equivalent definition. There are still other definitions in the research literature.

== See also ==
- Multiplicative graph
