= Stratified Morse theory =

In mathematics, stratified Morse theory is an analogue to Morse theory for general stratified spaces, originally developed by Mark Goresky and Robert MacPherson. The main point of the theory is to consider functions $f : M \to \mathbb R$ and consider how the stratified space $f^{-1}(-\infty,c]$ changes as the real number $c \in \mathbb R$ changes. Morse theory of stratified spaces has uses everywhere from pure mathematics topics such as braid groups and representations to robot motion planning and potential theory. A popular application in pure mathematics is Morse theory on manifolds with boundary, and manifolds with corners.

== See also ==
- Digital Morse theory
- Discrete Morse theory
- Level-set method
