= Round function =

In topology and in calculus, a round function is a scalar function $M\to{\mathbb{R}}$, over a manifold $M$, whose critical points form one or several connected components, each homeomorphic to the circle $S^1$, also called critical loops. Morse-Bott functions are special cases of round functions.

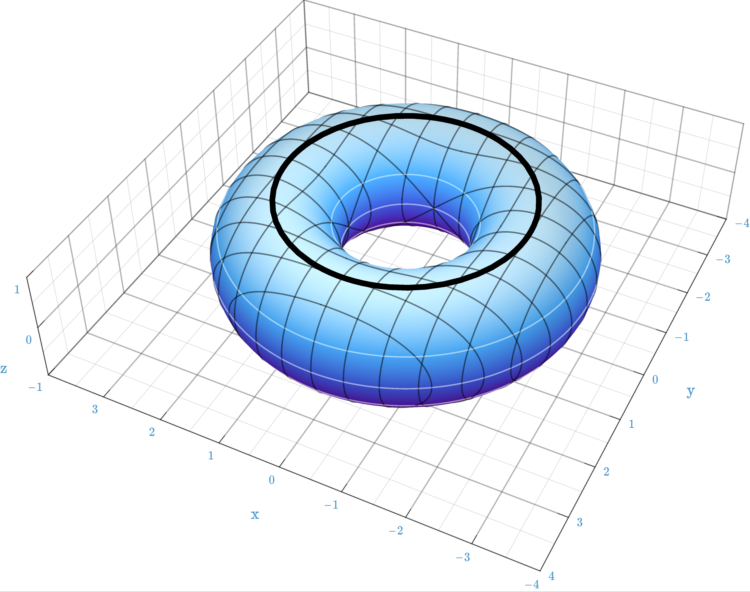
The black circle in one of this critical loops.

== For instance ==
For example, let $M$ be the torus. Let

$$K=(0,2\pi)\times(0,2\pi).\,$$

Then we know that a map

$$X\colon K\to{\mathbb{R}}^3\,$$

given by

$$X(\theta,\phi)=((2+\cos\theta)\cos\phi,(2+\cos\theta)\sin\phi,\sin\theta)\,$$

is a parametrization for almost all of $M$. Now, via the projection $\pi_3\colon{\mathbb{R}}^3\to{\mathbb{R}}$ we get the restriction

$$G=\pi_3|_M\colon M\to{\mathbb{R}},  (\theta,\phi) \mapsto \sin \theta \,$$

$G=G(\theta,\phi)=\sin\theta$ is a function whose critical sets are determined by

$${\rm grad}\ G(\theta,\phi)=
\left({{\partial}G\over {\partial}\theta},{{\partial}G\over {\partial}\phi}\right)\!\left(\theta,\phi\right)=(0,0),\,$$

this is if and only if $\theta={\pi\over 2},\ {3\pi\over 2}$.

These two values for $\theta$ give the critical sets

$$X({\pi/2},\phi)=(2\cos\phi,2\sin\phi,1)\,$$
$$X({3\pi/2},\phi)=(2\cos\phi,2\sin\phi,-1)\,$$

which represent two extremal circles over the torus $M$.

Observe that the Hessian for this function is

$${\rm hess}(G)=
\begin{bmatrix}
-\sin\theta & 0 \\ 0 & 0 \end{bmatrix}$$

which clearly it reveals itself as rank of ${\rm hess}(G)$ equal to one at the tagged circles, making the critical point degenerate, that is, showing that the critical points are not isolated.

== Round complexity ==
Mimicking the L–S category theory one can define the round complexity asking for whether or not exist round functions on manifolds and/or for the minimum number of critical loops.
