= Zanies Comedy Club =

Chain of comedy clubs

Coordinates: 41.9105°N 87.6349°W

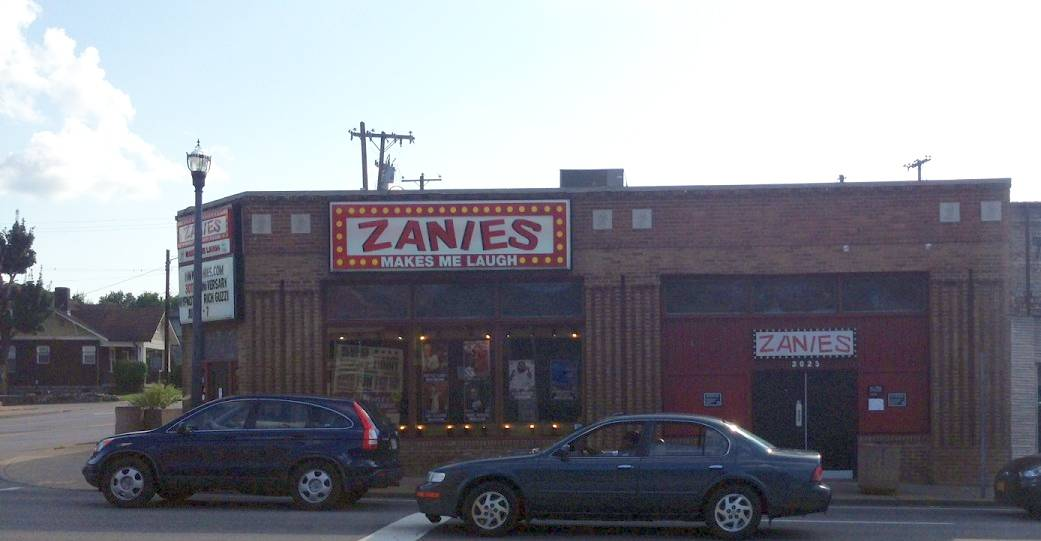
- Zanies of Nashville, Tennessee
- Interactive map of Zanies Comedy Club
- Address: 1548 N Wells St; Chicago, Illinois; USA
- Parking: Metered street parking; nearby parking garage

Construction
- Opened: November 1978

Website
- chicago.zanies.com

Zanies Comedy Club, located in Chicago, Illinois, was founded in November 1978 by Rick Uchwat. Since then, other locations have been built in Nashville, Tennessee, and Rosemont, Illinois.

== Rick Uchwat ==
Rick Uchwat was born in Austria in 1947. At 4 years old he came to Chicago through refugee camps and Ellis Island. His father was imprisoned by the Nazis during World War II and was held in the Auschwitz Concentration Camp. He attended DePaul University for a short time until eventually joining the US Marines. In 1968, Uchwat was sent to Vietnam and was badly injured during the Tet Offensive. Uchwat married Barbara Monahan in 1977. At the age of 64, May 12, 2011, Uchwat died of lung cancer.

== History ==
Jay Leno describes the venue as "the perfect comedy club. Playing there in the 70s was like playing the Cavern Club in Liverpool".

In 1985, Zanies became "arguably the king of Chicago's comedy clubs".

"Drinks were ordered. The music stopped. A man walked to the stage. And then it started, the laughter. The blissful disease, so easily contagious."

In 1998, Zanies hosted the Chicago Comedy Festival.

In 2008, Zanies celebrated their 30th anniversary.

Zanies opened up a location in Rosemont, Illinois in July 2012.

Zanies Comedy Club hosted a tribute to Robin Williams in August 2014.

Zanies Comedy Club in Chicago celebrated their 40th anniversary and continues to deliver nationally touring headliners 7 nights out of the week.

== Notable performers ==
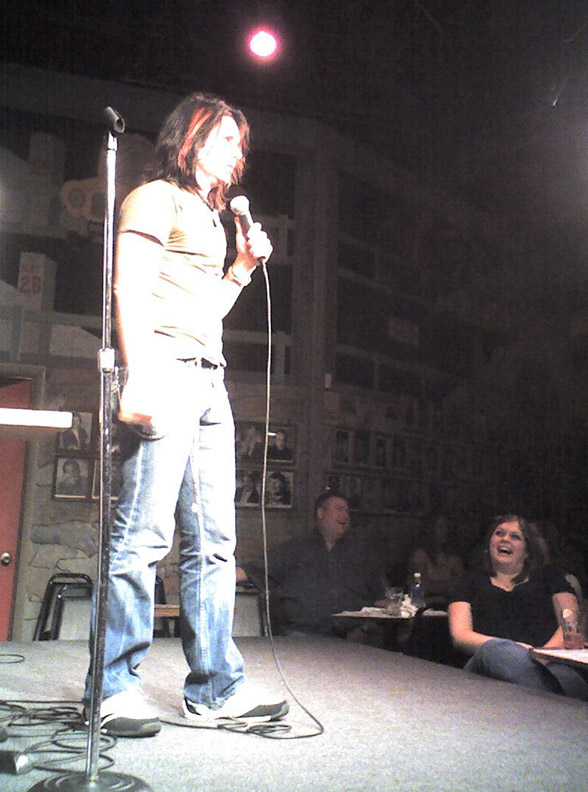
Hal Sparks performing at the Nashville venue

Zanies played an influential part in the careers of many comedians including, Jay Leno, Lewis Black, Annie Rauwerda, Emo Philips, Richard Lewis, Jerry Seinfeld, Frank Caliendo, Kathy Griffin, Larry Reeb, John Caponera, Hal Sparks, Bobby Slayton, and Roseanne Barr.

Other notable performers include: Sebastian Maniscalco, Colin Jost, Tiffany Haddish, Kevin Hart, Hannibal Buress, Bill Burr, Jimmy Fallon, Jimmy Pardo, John Mulaney, Sarah Silverman, Aziz Ansari, Tim Allen, Jeff Garlin, Jim Gaffigan, Chelsea Handler, David Cross, Chris Rock, Dave Chappelle, Daniel Tosh, Gilbert Gottfried, Kyle Kinane, Erik Griffin, Big Jay Oakerson, Mark Normand, Jared Freid, Andrew Schulz, Jermaine Fowler, David Koechner, Maz Jobrani, Vir Das, Ronny Chieng, Al Madrigal, Marc Maron, Tony Hinchcliffe, Dave Attell, and Pat McGann.

== Locations ==
Zanies has four locations, three of which are located in Illinois. The clubs are open every night of the week and have a minimum age requirement for attendance of 21 years with the exception of the Nashville club where the minimum age is 18 years.

- Chicago, Illinois, opened in 1978
- Rosemont, Illinois, opened in 2012 and seats 250
- Nashville, Tennessee, opened 1983 and seats around 300

Zanies Nashville is a 2013 Comedy Central Certified Club.

=== Former locations ===
- Vernon Hills, Illinois, closed in 2011
- St. Charles, Illinois, opened in 1989, seats 250, closed on November 30, 2019
- Mount Prospect (2200 Elmhurst Road), closed in 1998, 6 years after Jay Leno hosted two free shows on February 14, 1992, to anyone who could show an unemployment stub.
