= Prix Francoeur =

The Prix Francoeur, or Francoeur Prize, was an award granted by the Institut de France, Academie des Sciences, Fondation Francoeur to authors of works useful to the progress of pure and applied mathematics. Preference was given to young scholars or to geometricians not yet established. It was established in 1882 and has been discontinued.

Prize winners

- 1882–1888 — Emile Barbier
- 1889–1890 — Maximilien Marie
- 1891–1892 — Augustin Mouchot
- 1893 — Guy Robin
- 1894 — J. Collet
- 1895 — Jules Andrade
- 1896 — Alphonse Valson
- 1897 — Guy Robin
- 1898 — Aimé Vaschy
- 1899 — Le Cordier
- 1900 — Edmond Maillet
- 1901 — Léonce Laugel
- 1902–1904 — Emile Lemoine
- 1905 — Xavier Stouff
- 1906–1912 — Emile Lemoine
- 1913–1914 — A. Claude
- 1915 — Joseph Marty
- 1916 — René Gateaux
- 1917 — Henri Villat
- 1918 — Paul Montel
- 1919 — Georges Giraud
- 1920–1921 — René Baire
- 1922 — Louis Antoine
- 1923 — Gaston Bertrand
- 1924 — Ernest Malo
- 1925 — Georges Valiron
- 1926 — Gaston Julia
- 1927 — Georges Cerf
- 1928 — Szolem Mandelbrojt
- 1929 — Paul Noaillon
- 1930 — Eugène Fabry
- 1931 — Jacques Herbrand
- 1932 — Henri Milloux
- 1933 — Paul Mentre
- 1934 — Jean Favard
- 1935 — André Weil
- 1936 — Claude Chevalley
- 1937 — Jean Leray
- 1938 — Jean Dieudonné
- 1939 — Marcel Brelot
- 1940 — Charles Ehresmann
- 1941 — Paul Vincensini
- 1942 — Paul Dubreil
- 1943 — René de Possel
- 1944 — No award
- 1945 — No award
- 1946 — Laurent Schwartz
- 1952 — No award
- 1957 — Jean-Pierre Serre
- 1962 — Jean-Louis Koszul
- 1967 — Jacques Neveu
- 1972 — Pierre Gabriel
- 1977 — Jean-Claude Tougeron
- 1982 — François Laudenbach
- 1987 — Jean-Louis Loday
- 1992 — Georges Skandalis

== See also ==
- List of mathematics awards
