= René Gateaux =

French mathematician

René Eugène Gateaux
- Born: 5 May 1889; Vitry-le-François, Marne, France
- Died: 3 October 1914 (aged 25); Rouvroy, Pas-de-Calais, France
- Cause of death: Killed in action
- Occupation: Mathematician
- Military career
- Allegiance: France
- Branch: French Army
- Service years: 1910–1912; 1914
- Rank: Lieutenant
- Unit: 269th Infantry Regiment
- Conflicts: First World War: Western Front; Battle of the Frontiers; Battle of Grand Couronné; Race to the Sea †

René Eugène Gateaux (Note: In his birth certificate and own signature, his name is written without a circumflex accent, but it is found in some of his own publications, and moreso in many later texts.) (French: [ʁəne øʒɛn ɡɑto]; 5 May 1889 – 3 October 1914) was a French mathematician. He is principally known for the Gateaux derivative, used in the calculus of variations and in the theory of optimal control. He died in combat during World War I. Paul Lévy produced a posthumous edition of his works, extending them considerably, in his Leçons d'analyse fonctionnelle of 1922.

== Life ==
=== Early years ===
Gateaux was born on 5 May 1889 at Vitry-le-François, Marne, 222 years after another mathematician, Abraham de Moivre, was born there (de Moivre, being of Huguenot ancestry, fled to London after the Edict of Fontainebleau of 1685). His father had a small saddlery and upholstery business, and his mother was a seamstress. He was schooled at Reims, and in 1907 entered the École normale supérieure (ENS) on the rue d'Ulm. He was well regarded as one of the most promising mathematicians among his peers. During his time at ENS, Gateaux converted to Roman Catholicism.

=== Schoolteacher ===
In 1910, he sat the mathematics examination (being placed 11th of 16 in his year, a somewhat unimpressive result perhaps due to his being so young, according to the ENS's deputy head Émile Borel). He became a teacher at the lycée in Bar-le-Duc, Meuse in 1912, having completed his two years' military service (the first as a private soldier, and the second as a sub-lieutenant, as was required by a 1905 law concerning the service of students from some Grandes Écoles).

At the same time as he took the post at Bar-le-Duc, he started to work on his thesis about functional analysis, following the work of Vito Volterra and Jacques Hadamard, and its applications to potential theory. Even though it is unknown why Gateaux chose this subject, he may have been encouraged by Hadamard himself, who had just completed a course on the subject at the Collège de France. Among others, in 1911 Paul Lévy had undertaken a brilliant thesis on this type of question, and in 1912 Joseph Pérès, an alumnus of the ENS in the year before Gateaux, had left for Rome to work under Volterra.

=== Student in Rome ===
In 1913, Gateaux asked for, and was awarded, a bursary from the David Weill Foundation to go with him to Rome. Before leaving, he sent a letter to Borel and Volterra, on the subjects they had proposed he work on in Rome. Within it was the theme of integration of real functions in infinite-dimensional space.

He stayed in Rome from October 1913, following Volterra's course and working hard. He published numerous notes in the Rendiconti dell'Accademia dei Lincei, and presented a seminar at the University of Rome. He returned to France in June 1914, intending to return in the September after being awarded a Commercy bursary for another year.

=== Death in combat ===
Gateaux was caught off-guard by mobilisation and the August 1914 declaration of war. He was sent to Toul as a lieutenant in the 269th Infantry Regiment with responsibility for the 2nd Machine Guns section. Having helped defend Nancy in the Battle of Grand Couronné, his regiment was engaged in the Race to the Sea and sent to Artois. On the morning of 3 October 1914, Gateaux was killed by machine guns at the entrance to the village of Rouvroy, which his regiment was defending. In the confusion of battle, his body was not identified and was quickly interred. Several years later, his remains were exhumed and moved to Neuville-Saint-Vaast National Cemetery, where he was interred in Tomb 76.

=== Legacy ===
In August 1915, Hadamard started the process of awarding Gateaux a Prix de L'Académie des Sciences posthumously. In a letter to Émile Picard, he wrote:

Le jeune homme a laissé des recherches fort avancées en calcul fonctionnel (sa thèse était en grande partie composée et en partie exposée dans des notes présentées à l'Académie), recherches pour lesquelles M. Volterra et moi-même ont une grande considération. This young man has left his highly advanced research in functional calculus (his thesis was mostly written, and part had been published in notes presented to the Academy), research which M. Volterra and myself have greatly valued.

In 1916, Gateaux was awarded the Prix Francoeur. In 1918, Hadamard talked to Paul Lévy, who was responsible for a course on functional analysis at the Collège de France, about drafts Gateaux had left before his departure to the Front. He proposed that Lévy edit them for publication in the Bulletin de la Société Mathématique de France, in two parts. The most important discovery that Lévy found in Gateaux' papers was a draft theory for integrating functions in infinite dimensions. This work came to be of great importance to Lévy in writing his important work Leçons d'analyse fonctionnelle (1922). When Lévy was talking with the American mathematician Norbert Wiener in 1922, Wiener immediately saw that he could use Gateaux' definition to define his "differential space" and construct a measure of Brownian motion (later called a "Wiener measure"). In the foundation article that he published in 1923, Wiener paid homage to Gateaux and Lévy for producing les études les plus profondes sur l'intégration en dimension infinie ("The deepest studies on infinite-dimensional integration").

== Publications ==
- "Sur les fonctionnelles continues et les fonctionnelles analytiques" [On continuous functions and analytical functions]. Comptes rendus hebdomadaires des séances de l'Académie des sciences (in French). 157: 325–327. 1913.
- "Sur la notion d'intégrale dans le domaine fonctionnel et sur la théorie du potentiel" [On the concept of the integral in the functional domain and on potential theory] (PDF). Bulletin de la Société Mathématique de France (in French). 47: 47–70. 1919.
- "Fonctions d'une infinité de variables indépendantes" [Functions with infinite independent variables] (PDF). Bulletin de la Société Mathématique de France (in French). 47: 70–96. 1919.
- "Sur diverses questions du calcul fonctionnel" [On several questions of the functional calculus] (PDF). Bulletin de la Société Mathématique de France (in French). 50: 1–37. 1922.
