= Nguyễn Đình Ngọc =

Vietnamese Army general and mathematician

- Born: 13 August 1932; Phú Xuyên District, Hanoi
- Died: 2 May 2006 (aged 73)
- Education: University of Paris
- Scientific career
- Fields: Topology, Differential Geometry
- Doctoral advisor: Charles Ehresmann

Nguyễn Đình Ngọc (13 August 1932 – 2 May 2006) was a Vietnamese Army intelligence officer, later a general, and a mathematician.

== Biography ==
Nguyễn Đình Ngọc was born in Phượng Dực commune, Phú Xuyên District, Hanoi, Vietnam. In 1953, he joined the Intelligence Service and served in the Vietminh Army in the field of public security. He was then assigned to Saigon to work as a spy for North Vietnam (officially known as the Democratic Republic of Vietnam). In 1955, he moved to France to complete his studies after being awarded a scholarship. He attended the University of Paris, from which he graduated with three engineering degrees: Hydrology and Meteorology, Shipbuilding and Telecommunications. Additionally, he earned a Ph.D. in Geography and in Mathematics, under the supervision of Charles Ehresmann, with a thesis entitled "Sur les espaces fibres et les prolongements" (On fiber bundles and prolongations) at the Paris-Sorbonne University in 1963.

== Activity ==
In 1966, Ngọc returned to Vietnam where he was assigned the task of managing and developing the public telecommunications in the field of information security and technology for South Vietnam (officially known as Republic of Vietnam), while teaching mathematics at the Saigon University of Science and at various colleges in South Vietnam, as told by himself in an autobiographical article. At the same time he was a communist spy who sent important information to the North. After the Fall of Saigon and reunification of Vietnam on 30 April 1975, he helped develop the computer and telecommunication for the Socialist Republic of Vietnam's government. He also studied and accessed the computers provided by Soviet Union and other communist countries.

In 1989 Ngọc joined Thang Long University, a newly established private university in Hanoi. He was a founder of the Radio and Electronics Association of Vietnam and the Informatics Association of Vietnam. In 1994 he was promoted to Major general of Vietnam People's Public Security (police and security forces).

== Death ==
He died of cancer on May 2, 2006 at the hospital 198 (Ministry of Public Security).

== Works ==
- D. N. Nguyen (1960). "Sur la suite exacte de cohomologie non abélienne". C. R. Acad. Sci. Paris. 250: 3438.
- D. N. Nguyen (1960). "Cohomologie non abélienne et classes caractéristiques". C. R. Acad. Sci. Paris. 251: 2453.
- D. N. Nguyen (1961). "Sur la généralisation de la notion de tenseur". C. R. Acad. Sci. Paris. 252: 4100.
- D. N. Nguyen (1963), "Sur les espaces fibrés et les prolongements", Séminaire Ehresmann. Topologie et géométrie différentielle, 4: 1
