= Cahiers de Topologie et Géométrie Différentielle Catégoriques =

- Discipline: Mathematics
- Language: English

Publication details
- History: 1957–present
- Frequency: Quarterly

Standard abbreviations
- ISO 4: Cah. Topol. Géom. Différ. Catég.

Indexing
- ISSN: 1245-530X

The Cahiers de Topologie et Géométrie Différentielle Catégoriques (French: Notebooks of categorical topology and categorical differential geometry) is a French mathematical scientific journal established by Charles Ehresmann in 1957. It concentrates on category theory "and its applications, [e]specially in topology and differential geometry". Its older papers (two years or more after publication) are freely available on the internet through the French NUMDAM service.

It was originally published by the Institut Henri Poincaré under the name Cahiers de Topologie; after the first volume, Ehresmann changed the publisher to the Institut Henri Poincaré and later Dunod/Bordas. In the eighth volume he changed the name to Cahiers de Topologie et Géométrie Différentielle. After Ehresmann's death in 1979 the editorship passed to his wife Andrée Ehresmann; in 1984, at the suggestion of René Guitart, the name was changed again, to add "Catégoriques".
