= Andrée Ehresmann =

French mathematician (1935–2026)

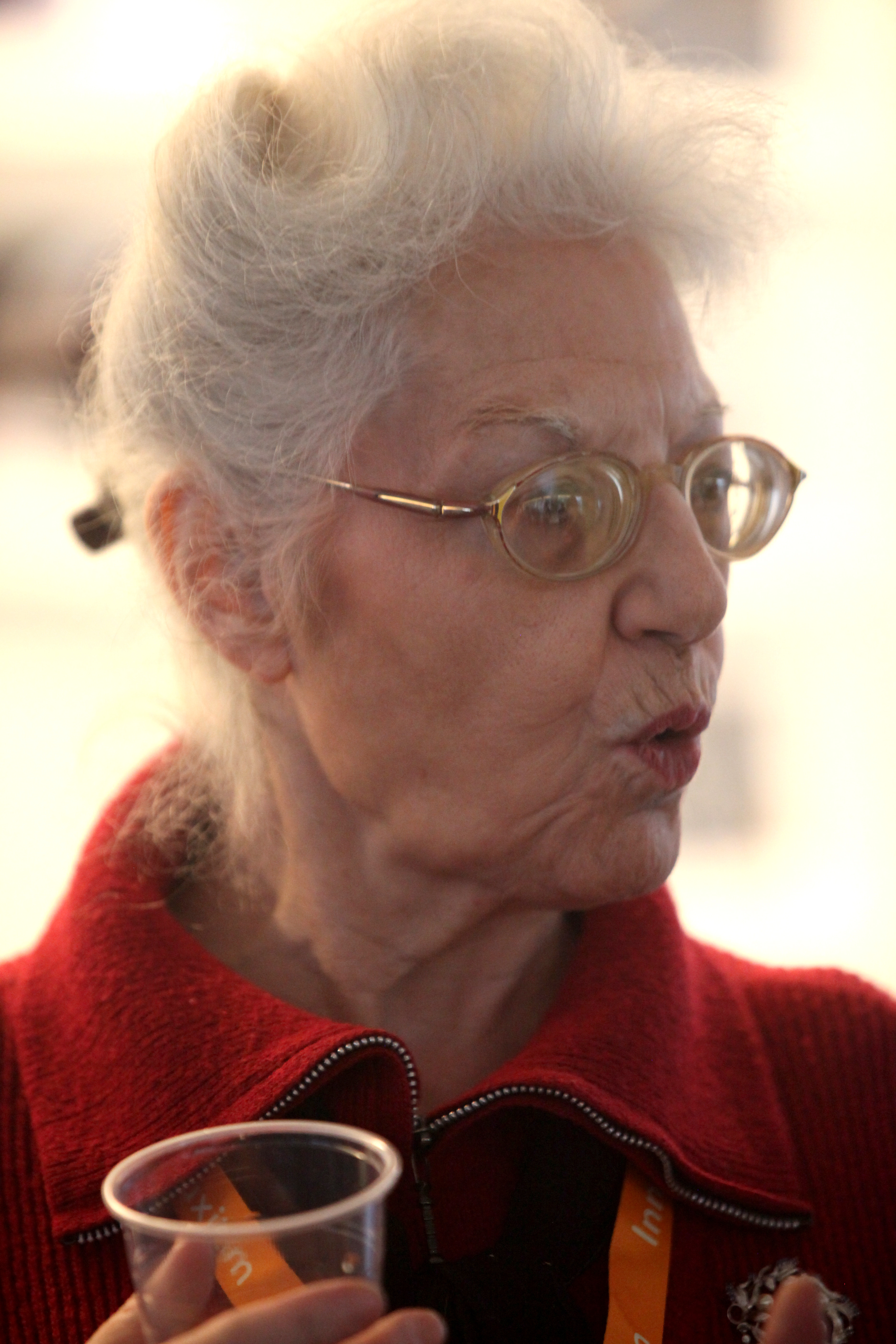
- Ehresmann in 2010
- Born: Andrée Bastiani; 7 September 1935; Nice, France
- Died: 21 August 2026 (aged 90); Amiens, France
- Education: University of Paris
- Spouse: Charles Ehresmann
- Scientific career
- Fields: Mathematics
- Workplaces: University of Picardy Jules Verne
- Thesis: Différentiabilité dans les espaces localement convexes. Distructures (1962)
- Doctoral advisor: Gustave Choquet
- Website: https://mes-ehres.fr/indexAE.htm

Andrée Ehresmann (née Bastiani) (7 September 1935 – 21 August 2026) was a French mathematician who specialised in category theory.

== Life ==
Ehresmann obtained her baccalauréat in 1952; subsequently, she studied in Marseille and Paris.

She was a researcher at CNRS from 1957 to 1963. She was awarded a Ph.D. in 1962 at University of Paris under the supervision of Gustave Choquet. Her thesis was entitled Différentiabilité dans les espaces localement convexes. Distructures [Differentiability in locally convex spaces. Distructures].

In 1967 she became a professor at IRCAM, at the University of Picardie Jules Verne; after she retired, she became emerita professor.

Ehresmann died in Amiens on 21 August 2026, at the age of 90.

== Research ==
Ehresmann published over 100 works on Analysis (Differential Calculus and Infinite-dimensional Distributions, Guiding Systems and Optimization Problems), Category Theory (with her husband, Charles Ehresmann: sketches and internal categories, multiple categories, closed monoidal structures) and the modeling of complex autonomous systems (Memory Scalable Systems, including the MENS model for neuro-cognitive systems).

She developed, with Jean-Paul Vanbremeersch a model of Memory Evolutive Systems, which proposes a mathematical model for 'living' systems with a hierarchy of complex components with multiple temporalities, such as biological, neuro-cognitive, or social systems. Based on a theory of 'dynamic' categories, evolving memory systems can analyze complexity, emergence and self-organization.

Ehresmann was the director of the mathematical journal Cahiers de Topologie et Géométrie Différentielle Catégoriques.
