= Paul Vincensini =

French mathematician

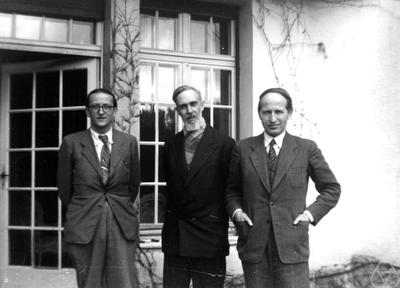
Left to right: Georges Reeb, Paul Vincensini, and Charles Ehresmann, at a topology conference in Oberwolfach, 1949

Paul Félix Vincensini (30 April 1896, in Bastia – 9 August 1978, in La Ciotat) was a French mathematician.

In 1927, he wrote his dissertation Sur trois types de congruences rectilignes at the University of Toulouse. In 1945, working as a Professor at the University of Besançon, he was awarded the Charles Dupin Prize of the French Academy of Sciences, for his work in higher geometry. In 1949, he got the Prix de la Pensée Française. In the same year, he went to Marseille University. He retired in 1967, but still accepted presidency of a symposium of the Florence Institute for Pure and Applied Mathematical Sciences in 1978.

== Selected works ==
- Paul Félix Vincensini (Sep 1950). "Sur certains réseaux tracés sur une surface et leur rôle en géométrie différentielle". In Lawrence M. Graves and Paul A. Smith and Einar Hille and Oscar Zariski (ed.). Proc. International Congress of Mathematicians (PDF). American Mathematical Society. p. 509.
- Paul Félix Vincensini (1957). "Vue d'ensemble sur l'œuvre géométrique de Luigi Bianchi". Rendiconti del Seminario Matematico. 16: 115–157.
- Paul Félix Vincensini (Nov 1958). "Sur une représentation dans E_{4} des congruences W à nappes focales réglées de E_{3}". Archiv der Mathematik 1. XI. 9 (4): 360–365.
- Vincensini, P. (1972). "La géométrie différentielle au XIXe siècle". Scientia. 101: 617–696.
