= Haefliger structure =

Generalization of a foliation

In mathematics, a Haefliger structure on a topological space is a generalization of a foliation of a manifold, introduced by André Haefliger in 1970. Any foliation on a manifold induces a special kind of Haefliger structure, which uniquely determines the foliation.

== Definition ==
A codimension-$q$ Haefliger structure on a topological space $X$ consists of the following data:

- a cover of $X$ by open sets $U_\alpha$;
- a collection of continuous maps $f_\alpha: X \to \mathbb{R}^q$;
- for every $x \in U_\alpha \cap U_\beta$, a diffeomorphism $\psi_{\alpha \beta}^x$ between open neighbourhoods of $f_\alpha(x)$ and $f_\beta(x)$ with $\Psi^x_{\alpha \beta} \circ f_\alpha = f_\beta$;

such that the continuous maps $\Psi_{\alpha \beta}: x \mapsto \mathrm{germ}_x (\psi^x_{\alpha \beta})$ from $U_\alpha \cap U_\beta$ to the sheaf of germs of local diffeomorphisms of $\R^q$ satisfy the 1-cocycle condition

$\displaystyle\Psi_{\gamma\alpha}(u) = \Psi_{\gamma\beta}(u)\Psi_{\beta\alpha}(u)$ for $u\in U_\alpha\cap U_\beta\cap U_\gamma.$

The cocycle $\Psi_{\alpha \beta}$ is also called a Haefliger cocycle.

More generally, $\mathcal{C}^r$, piecewise linear, analytic, and continuous Haefliger structures are defined by replacing sheaves of germs of smooth diffeomorphisms by the appropriate sheaves.

== Examples and constructions ==
=== Pullbacks ===
An advantage of Haefliger structures over foliations is that they are closed under pullbacks. More precisely, given a Haefliger structure on $X$, defined by a Haefliger cocycle $\Psi_{\alpha \beta}$, and a continuous map $f: Y \to X$, the pullback Haefliger structure on $Y$ is defined by the open cover $f^{-1}(U_\alpha)$ and the cocycle $\Psi_{\alpha \beta} \circ f$. As particular cases we obtain the following constructions:

- Given a Haefliger structure on $X$ and a subspace $Y \subseteq X$, the restriction of the Haefliger structure to $Y$ is the pullback Haefliger structure with respect to the inclusion $Y \hookrightarrow X$
- Given a Haefliger structure on $X$ and another space $Y$, the product of the Haefliger structure with $Y$ is the pullback Haefliger structure with respect to the projection $X \times Y \to X$

=== Foliations ===
Recall that a codimension-$q$ foliation on a smooth manifold can be specified by a covering of $X$ by open sets $U_\alpha$, together with a submersion $\phi_\alpha$ from each open set $U_\alpha$ to $\R^q$, such that for each $\alpha, \beta$ there is a map $\Phi_{\alpha \beta}$ from $U_\alpha \cap U_\beta$ to local diffeomorphisms with

$$\phi_\alpha(v)= \Phi_{\alpha,\beta}(u)(\phi_\beta(v))$$

whenever $v$ is close enough to $u$. The Haefliger cocycle is defined by

$\Psi_{\alpha,\beta}(u) =$ germ of $\Phi_{\alpha,\beta}(u)$ at u.

As anticipated, foliations are not closed in general under pullbacks but Haefliger structures are. Indeed, given a continuous map $f: X \to Y$, one can take pullbacks of foliations on $Y$ provided that $f$ is transverse to the foliation, but if $f$ is not transverse the pullback can be a Haefliger structure that is not a foliation.

== Classifying space ==
Two Haefliger structures on $X$ are called concordant if they are the restrictions of Haefliger structures on $X \times [0,1]$ to $X \times 0$ and $X \times 1$.

There is a classifying space $B\Gamma_q$ for codimension-$q$ Haefliger structures which has a universal Haefliger structure on it in the following sense. For any topological space $X$ and continuous map from $X$ to $B\Gamma_q$ the pullback of the universal Haefliger structure is a Haefliger structure on $X$. For well-behaved topological spaces $X$ this induces a 1:1 correspondence between homotopy classes of maps from $X$ to $B\Gamma_q$ and concordance classes of Haefliger structures.
