= Georges Reeb =

French mathematician (1920–1993)

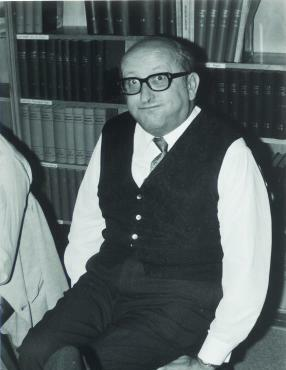
- Born: 12 November 1920; Saverne, France
- Died: 6 November 1993 (aged 72); Strasbourg, France
- Education: University of Strasbourg
- Known for: Foliation; Reeb foliation Reeb graph Reeb sphere theorem Reeb stability theorem Reeb vector field
- Awards: Prize Petit-D'Ormoy (1971)
- Scientific career
- Fields: Mathematics
- Workplaces: University of Strasbourg
- Thesis: Propriétés topologiques des variétés feuilletées (1948)
- Doctoral advisor: Charles Ehresmann
- Doctoral students: Claude Godbillon; Jean Martinet

Georges Henri Reeb (12 November 1920 – 6 November 1993) was a French mathematician. He worked in differential topology, differential geometry, differential equations, topological dynamical systems theory and non-standard analysis.

== Biography ==
Reeb was born in Saverne, Bas-Rhin, Alsace, to Theobald Reeb and Caroline Engel. He started studying mathematics at University of Strasbourg, but in 1939 the entire university was evacuated to Clermont-Ferrand due to the German occupation of France.

After the war, he completed his studies and in 1948 he defended his PhD thesis, entitled Propriétés topologiques des variétés feuilletées [Topological properties of foliated manifolds] and supervised by Charles Ehresmann.

In 1952 Reeb was appointed professor at Université Joseph Fourier in Grenoble and in 1954 he visited the Institute for Advanced Study. From 1963 he worked at Université Louis Pasteur in Strasbourg.

There, in 1965 he created with Jean Leray and Pierre Lelong the series of meeting Rencontres entre Mathématiciens et Physiciens Théoriciens. in 1966 Reeb and Jean Frenkel founded the Institute de Recherche mathématique Avancée, the first university laboratory associated to the Centre National de la Recherche Scientifique, which he directed between 1967 and 1972.

In 1967 he was President of the Société Mathématique de France and in 1971 he was awarded the Prize Petit d'Ormoy.

In 1991 Reeb received an honorary doctorate from Albert-Ludwigs-Universität Freiburg and from Université de Neuchâtel. He died in 1993 in Strasbourg when he was 72 years old.

== Research ==
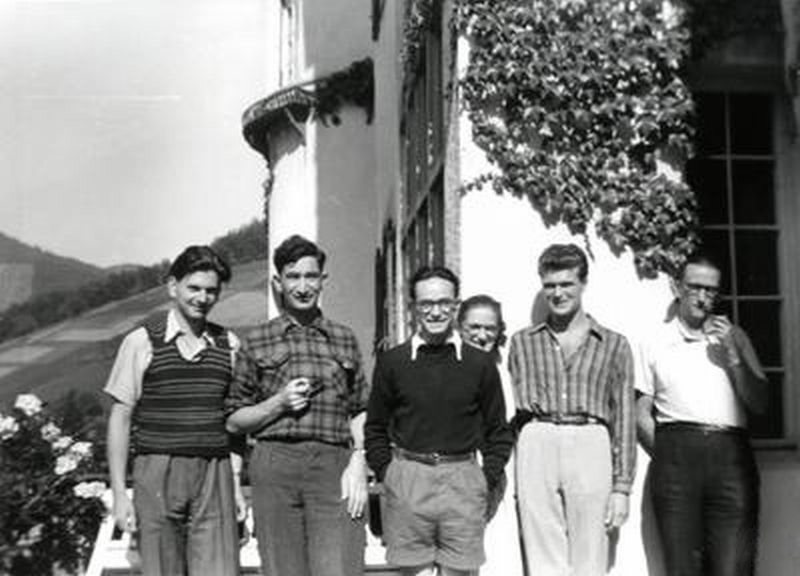
From left to right: René Thom, Jean Arbault, Jean-Pierre Serre, Josiane Serre, Jean Braconnier and Georges Reeb at the Mathematical Research Institute of Oberwolfach in 1949

Reeb was the founder of the topological theory of foliations, a geometric structure on smooth manifolds which partition them in smaller pieces. In particular, he described what is now called the Reeb foliation, a foliation of the 3-sphere, whose leaves are all diffeomorphic to $\mathbb{R}^2$, except one, which is a 2-torus.

One of its first significant result, Reeb stability theorem, describes the local structure foliations around a compact leaf with finite holonomy group.

His works on foliations had also applications in Morse theory. In particular, the Reeb sphere theorem says that a compact manifold with a function with exactly two critical points is homeomorphic to the sphere. In turn, in 1956 this was used to prove that the Milnor spheres, although not diffeomorphic, are homeomorphic to the sphere $S^7$.

Other important geometric concepts named after him include the Reeb graph and the Reeb vector field associated to a contact form.

Towards the end of his career, Reeb become a supporter of the theory of non-standard analysis by Abraham Robinson, coining the slogan "The naïve integers don't fill up $\mathbb{N}$" and working on its applications to dynamical systems.

== Selected works ==
=== Books ===
- with Wu Wen-Tsün: Sur les espaces fibrés et les variétés feuilletées, 1952
- with A. Fuchs: Statistiques commentées, 1967
- with J. Klein: Formules commentées de mathématiques: Programme P.C., 1971
- Feuilletages: résultats anciens et nouveaux (Painlevé, Hector et Martinet), 1974

=== Articles ===
- "Sur les points singuliers d'une forme de Pfaff complètement intégrable ou d'une fonction numérique". C. R. Acad. Sci. Paris. 222: 847–849. 1946.
- "Variétés feuilletées, feuilles voisines". C. R. Acad. Sci. 224. Paris: 1613–1614. 1947.
- "Sur certaines propriétés topologiques des variétés feuilletées". Actualités Sci. Ind., Publ. Inst. Math. Univ. Strasbourg. 11 (1183). Paris: Hermann & Cie.: 5–89, 155–156 1952.
- with André Haefliger: "Variétés (non séparées) à une dimension et structures feuilletées du plan". Enseignement Mathématique. 2 (3): 107–125. 1957.

== See also ==
- Séminaire Nicolas Bourbaki
- Séminaire Nicolas Bourbaki (1950–1959)
