= Reeb sphere theorem =

On when a manifold that admits a singular foliation is homeomorphic to the sphere

In mathematics, Reeb sphere theorem, named after Georges Reeb, states that

A closed oriented connected manifold M^{n} that admits a singular foliation having only centers is homeomorphic to the sphere S^{n} and the foliation has exactly two singularities.

== Morse foliation ==
A singularity of a foliation F is of Morse type if in its small neighborhood all leaves of the foliation are level sets of a Morse function, being the singularity a critical point of the function. The singularity is a center if it is a local extremum of the function; otherwise, the singularity is a saddle.

The number of centers c and the number of saddles $s$, specifically $c-s$, is tightly connected with the manifold topology.

We denote $\operatorname{ind} p = \min(k,n-k)$, the index of a singularity $p$, where k is the index of the corresponding critical point of a Morse function. In particular, a center has index 0, index of a saddle is at least 1.

A Morse foliation F on a manifold M is a singular transversely oriented codimension one foliation of class $C^2$ with isolated singularities such that:

- each singularity of F is of Morse type,
- each singular leaf L contains a unique singularity p; in addition, if $\operatorname{ind} p = 1$ then $L\setminus p$ is not connected.

== Reeb sphere theorem ==
This is the case $c>s=0$, the case without saddles.

Theorem: Let $M^n$ be a closed oriented connected manifold of dimension $n\ge 2$. Assume that $M^n$ admits a $C^1$-transversely oriented codimension one foliation $F$ with a non empty set of singularities all of them centers. Then the singular set of $F$ consists of two points and $M^n$ is homeomorphic to the sphere $S^n$.

It is a consequence of the Reeb stability theorem.

== Generalization ==
More general case is $c>s\ge 0.$

In 1978, Edward Wagneur generalized the Reeb sphere theorem to Morse foliations with saddles. He showed that the number of centers cannot be too much as compared with the number of saddles, notably, $c\le s+2$. So there are exactly two cases when $c>s$:

(1) $c=s+2,$

(2) $c=s+1.$

He obtained a description of the manifold admitting a foliation with singularities that satisfy (1).

Theorem: Let $M^n$ be a compact connected manifold admitting a Morse foliation $F$ with $c$ centers and $s$ saddles. Then $c\le s+2$. In case $c=s+2$,

- $M$ is homeomorphic to $S^n$,
- all saddles have index 1,
- each regular leaf is diffeomorphic to $S^{n-1}$.

Finally, in 2008, César Camacho and Bruno Scardua considered the case (2), $c=s+1$. This is possible in a small number of low dimensions.

Theorem: Let $M^n$ be a compact connected manifold and $F$ a Morse foliation on $M$. If $s = c + 1$, then

- $n=2,4,8$ or $16$,
- $M^n$ is an Eells–Kuiper manifold.
