= André Haefliger =

Swiss mathematician (1929–2023)

- Born: 22 May 1929; Nyon, Switzerland
- Died: 7 March 2023 (aged 93)
- Education: University of Lausanne; University of Paris
- Known for: Haefliger structure
- Awards: Leroy P. Steele Prize
- Scientific career
- Fields: Mathematics
- Workplaces: University of Geneva
- Thesis: Structures feuilletées et cohomologie à valeurs dans un faisceau de groupoides (1958)
- Doctoral advisor: Charles Ehresmann
- Doctoral students: Augustin Banyaga; Vaughan Jones
- Website: https://www.unige.ch/math/folks/haefliger/

André Haefliger (Swiss Standard German pronunciation: [ˈandreː ˈhɛːflɪɡər]; 22 May 1929 – 7 March 2023) was a Swiss mathematician who worked primarily on topology.

== Education and career ==
Haefliger went to school in Nyon and then attended his final years at Collège de Genève in Geneva. He studied mathematics at the University of Lausanne from 1948 to 1952. He worked for two years as a teaching assistant at École Polytechnique de l'Université de Lausanne. He then moved to University of Strasbourg, then he followed Charles Ehresmann in Paris, where he received his Ph.D. degree in 1958. His thesis was entitled "Structures feuilletées et cohomologie à valeurs dans un faisceau de groupoïdes" and was written under the supervision of Charles Ehresmann.

Haefliger got a research fellowship for one year at the University of Paris, where he participated in the seminar of Henri Cartan, and then from 1959 to 1961 he worked at the Institute for Advanced Study in Princeton, New Jersey. Since 1962 he has been a full professor at the University of Geneva until his retirement in 1996.

In 1966 Haefliger was invited speaker at the International Congress of Mathematicians in Moscow. In 1974–75, he was president of the Swiss Mathematical Society.

Haefliger obtained a Doctorate honoris causa from the ETH Zurich in 1992 and from the University of Dijon in 1997. In 2020 Haefliger and Martin Bridson were awarded the American Mathematical Society's Leroy P. Steele Prize for Mathematical Exposition, for their book Metric Spaces of Non-Positive Curvature (Springer Verlag, 1999).

Haefliger died on 7 March 2023, at the age of 93.

== Research ==
Haefliger's main research interests were differential topology and geometry.

Haefliger found the topological obstruction to the existence of a spin structure on an orientable Riemannian manifold. In two papers in the Annals he studied various embedding of spheres in relations to knot theory. He has also made important contributions in the theory of foliations, introducing the notion of Haefliger structures.

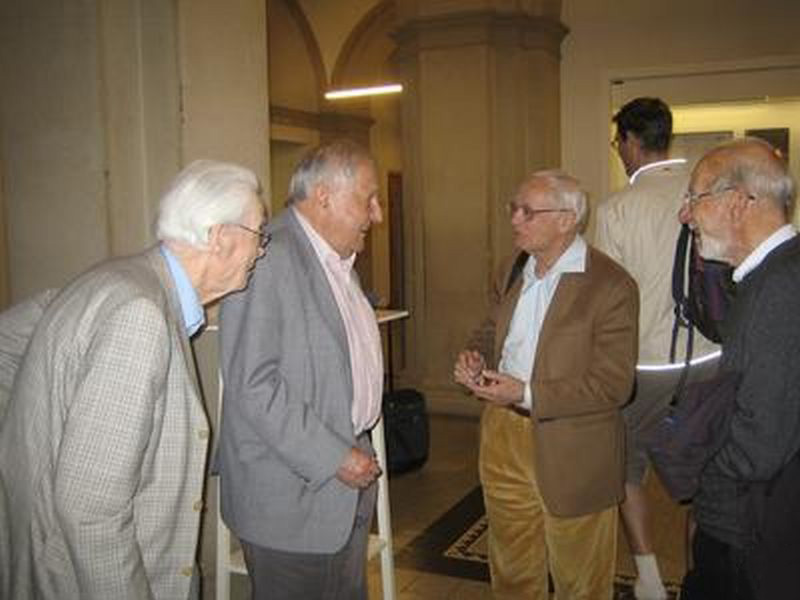
From left to right: Beno Eckmann, Peter Hilton, Jean-Pierre Serre, and André Haefliger in Zürich in 2007

He wrote more than 80 papers in peer review journals and had 20 Ph.D. students, including Augustin Banyaga and the future Field Medalist Vaughan Jones.

== Selected works ==
- Haefliger, André (1988). "Un aperçu de l'oeuvre de Thom en topologie différentielle (jusqu'en 1957)" (PDF). Publications Mathématiques de l'IHÉS. 68: 13–18. doi:10.1007/BF02698538. S2CID 123652699.
- "Travaux de Novikov sur les feuilletages." Séminaire Bourbaki 10 (1966-1968): 433-444.
- "Sur les classes caractéristiques des feuilletages." Séminaire Bourbaki 14 (1971-1972): 239-260.
- "Sphères d'homotopie nouées." Séminaire Bourbaki 9 (1964-1966): 57-68.
- "Feuilletages riemanniens." Séminaire Bourbaki 31 (1988-1989): 183-197.
- "Plongements de variétés dans le domaine stable." Séminaire Bourbaki 8 (1962-1964): 63-77.
- Haefliger, André (1987). "Des espaces homogènes à la résolution de Koszul" (PDF). Annales de l'Institut Fourier. 37 (4): 5–13. doi:10.5802/aif.1107.
- "Variétés feuilletées" (PDF). Annali della Scuola Normale Superiore di Pisa - Classe di Scienze. 16 (4): 367–397. 1962.
- Haefliger, André (1976). "Sur la cohomologie de l'algèbre de Lie des champs de vecteurs" (PDF). Annales Scientifiques de l'École Normale Supérieure. 9 (4): 503–532. doi:10.24033/asens.1316.
- Haefliger, André (1992). "Extension of complexes of groups" (PDF). Annales de l'Institut Fourier. 42 (1–2): 275–311. doi:10.5802/aif.1292.
- Haefliger, André (1960). "Quelques remarques sur les applications différentiables d'une surface dans le plan" (PDF). Annales de l'Institut Fourier. 10: 47–60. doi:10.5802/aif.97.
- "Plongements différentiables de variétés dans variétés." Commentarii Mathematici Helvetici. 36: 47–82. 1961.
- "Structures feuilletées et cohomologie à valeur dans un faisceau de groupoides". Commentarii Mathematici Helvetici. 32: 248–329. 1957. (Ph.D. Thesis)
- Haefliger, André; Shapiro, Arnold (1962). "Plongements différentiables dans le domaine stable". Commentarii Mathematici Helvetici. 37: 155–176. doi:10.1007/BF02566970. S2CID 120702104.
- Haefliger, André (1966). "Enlacements de sphères en codimension supérieure à 2". Commentarii Mathematici Helvetici. 41: 51–72. doi:10.1007/BF02566868. S2CID 119701637.
- Haefliger, André; Valentin, Poenaru (1964). "La classification des immersions combinatoires" (PDF). Publications Mathématiques de l'IHÉS. 23: 75–91. doi:10.1007/BF02684311. MR 0172296. S2CID 122155839.
- Armand, Borel; Haefliger, André (1961). "La classe d'homologie fondamentale d'un espace analytique" (PDF). Bulletin de la Société Mathématique de France. 89: 461–513. doi:10.24033/bsmf.1571. MR 0149503.
- Bridson, Martin R.; Haefliger, André (1999). Metric Spaces of Non-Positive Curvature. Grundlehren der mathematischen Wissenschaften. Vol. 319. Berlin, Heidelberg: Springer. doi:10.1007/978-3-662-12494-9. ISBN 978-3-642-08399-0. MR 1744486.
