= Reeb stability theorem =

Mathematical theory

In mathematics, Reeb stability theorem, named after Georges Reeb, asserts that if one leaf of a codimension-one foliation is closed and has finite fundamental group, then all the leaves are closed and have finite fundamental group.

== Reeb local stability theorem ==
Theorem: Let $F$ be a $C^1$, codimension $k$ foliation of a manifold $M$ and $L$ a compact leaf with finite holonomy group. There exists a neighborhood $U$ of $L$, saturated in $F$ (also called invariant), in which all the leaves are compact with finite holonomy groups. Further, we can define a retraction $\pi: U\to L$ such that, for every leaf $L'\subset U$, $\pi|_{L'}:L'\to L$ is a covering map with a finite number of sheets and, for each $y\in L$, $\pi^{-1}(y)$ is homeomorphic to a disk of dimension k and is transverse to $F$. The neighborhood $U$ can be taken to be arbitrarily small.

The last statement means in particular that, in a neighborhood of the point corresponding to a compact leaf with finite holonomy, the space of leaves is Hausdorff. Under certain conditions the Reeb local stability theorem may replace the Poincaré–Bendixson theorem in higher dimensions. This is the case of codimension one, singular foliations $(M^n,F)$, with $n\ge 3$, and some center-type singularity in $Sing(F)$.

The Reeb local stability theorem also has a version for a noncompact codimension-1 leaf.

== Reeb global stability theorem ==
An important problem in foliation theory is the study of the influence exerted by a compact leaf upon the global structure of a foliation. For certain classes of foliations, this influence is considerable.

Theorem: Let $F$ be a $C^1$, codimension one foliation of a closed manifold $M$. If $F$ contains a compact leaf $L$ with finite fundamental group, then all the leaves of $F$ are compact, with finite fundamental group. If $F$ is transversely orientable, then every leaf of $F$ is diffeomorphic to $L$; $M$ is the total space of a fibration $f:M\to S^1$ over $S^1$, with fibre $L$, and $F$ is the fibre foliation, $\{f^{-1}(\theta)|\theta\in S^1\}$.

This theorem holds true even when $F$ is a foliation of a manifold with boundary, which is, a priori, tangent on certain components of the boundary and transverse on other components. In this case it implies Reeb sphere theorem.

Reeb Global Stability Theorem is false for foliations of codimension greater than one. However, for some special kinds of foliations one has the following global stability results:

- In the presence of a certain transverse geometric structure:

Theorem: Let $F$ be a complete conformal foliation of codimension $k\ge 3$ of a connected manifold $M$. If $F$ has a compact leaf with finite holonomy group, then all the leaves of $F$ are compact with finite holonomy group.

- For holomorphic foliations in complex Kähler manifold:

Theorem: Let $F$ be a holomorphic foliation of codimension $k$ in a compact complex Kähler manifold. If $F$ has a compact leaf with finite holonomy group then every leaf of $F$ is compact with finite holonomy group.
