= Bulletin de la Société Mathématique de France =

- Discipline: Mathematics
- Language: French and English
- Edited by: François Dahmani

Publication details
- History: 1873–present
- Publisher: Société Mathématique de France
- Frequency: Quarterly
- Impact factor: 0.400 (2009)

Standard abbreviations
- ISO 4: Bull. Soc. Math. Fr.
- MathSciNet: Bull. Soc. Math. France

Indexing
- CODEN: BSMFAA
- ISSN: 0037-9484
- LCCN: 85171610

Links
- Journal homepage; Online access

Page from a journal article.

Bulletin de la Société Mathématique de France is a mathematics journal published quarterly by Société Mathématique de France. Founded in 1873, the journal publishes articles on mathematics. It publishes articles in French and English. The journal is indexed by Mathematical Reviews and Zentralblatt MATH. In 2025, its SJR is 1,156. Its 2009 MCQ was 0.58, and its 2023 impact factor was 0.5.
