= Lycée Kléber =

Public secondary school in Strasbourg, France

Coordinates: 48°35′39″N 7°45′18″E

Lycée Kléber in 2014

The Lycée Kléber is a French public secondary school located in the Alsatian capital Strasbourg. This lycée bears the name of the famous French Général Kléber who was murdered in Egypt in 1800.

== Diploma ==
It offers both a secondary-level curriculum (a lycée, with a student body of around 2.000), and a university-level curriculum (known as classes préparatoires, or prépas, also with about 900 pupils), preparing students for entrance to the elite Grandes Écoles. At the yearly competitive entrance examinations for the scientific and business Grandes Écoles, students from the Lycée Kléber's classes préparatoires regularly have good results.

=== Notes ===
- The lycée Kléber prepares students to sit for the baccalauréat général. They have to choose one of three streams (termed séries) in the penultimate lycée year. The streams for the baccalauréat général are as follows:
  - scientifique (sciences)
  - économique et sociale (economics and social sciences)
  - littéraire (literature)
- There are about 22 classes préparatoires
