= Larry Reeb =

Larry Reeb (a.k.a. Uncle Lar) is a stand-up comedian from Chicago, Illinois. He is best known for his one-liners often followed by the catchphrase "That's a tip from your Uncle Lar". His earliest recorded and released performance was in 1987.

Reeb is a frequent guest on The Bob & Tom Show, as well as Todd-N-Tyler Radio Empire. In 2006, he auditioned for the fourth season of Last Comic Standing and made it to the second part of the quarterfinals.

== Television/Video Appearances ==
- "Opening Night at Rodney's Place" (Hosted by Rodney Dangerfield) - HBO
- "Comedy Club Network" "Comedy Club Allstars 1" - Showtime
- "Comic Strip Live" - Fox
- "Comedy Express" - Fox
- "Comedy on the Road" - A&E
- "Standup Spotlight" - VH1
- "1/2 Comedy Hour" - MTV
- "Ben Around Town" - PBS
- "Chicago Sports Profiles" (Hosted by Tom Dreesen) - Fox Sports Networks
- "New Years Eve at Zanies" (Hosted by Jenny Jones) - WGN
- "Truly Tasteless Jokes" - Vestron Video

== Awards ==
- Las Vegas Comedy Fest - Voted "Best of Fest" and "Comedy Club Pick"
- Chicago Music Awards - Voted "Chicago Comedian of the Year"

== Discography ==
- It's A Sick World, I'm A Happy Guy (1999)
- It's A Sick World, I'm A Happy Guy, Volume 2 (2000)
- It's A Sick World, I'm A Happy Guy, Volume 3 (2009)
