= James Carrell =

James Carrell may refer to:

- James B. Carrell (born 1940), American and Canadian mathematician
- James P. Carrell (1787–1854), minister, singing teacher, composer and songbook compiler
