= Nicolas Bourbaki =

Pseudonym of a group of mathematicians

Association of Collaborators of Nicolas Bourbaki
- Association des collaborateurs et collaboratrices de Nicolas Bourbaki
- Named after: Charles-Denis Bourbaki
- Formation: 10 December 1934 (first unofficial meeting); 10–17 July 1935 (first official, founding conference)
- Founders: Henri Cartan; Claude Chevalley; Jean Coulomb; Jean Delsarte; Jean Dieudonné; Charles Ehresmann; Szolem Mandelbrojt; René de Possel; André Weil
- Founded at: Latin Quarter, Paris, France (first unofficial meeting); Besse-en-Chandesse, France (first official, founding conference)
- Type: Voluntary association
- Headquarters: École Normale Supérieure, Paris
- Members: Confidential
- Official language: French
- Website: Official website
- Formerly called: Committee for the Treatise on Analysis

Nicolas Bourbaki (French: [nikola buʁbaki]) is the collective pseudonym of a group of mathematicians, predominantly French alumni of the École normale supérieure (ENS). Founded in 1934–1935, the Bourbaki group originally intended to prepare a new textbook in analysis. Over time the project became much more ambitious, growing into a large series of textbooks published under the Bourbaki name, meant to treat modern pure mathematics. The series is known collectively as the Éléments de mathématique (Elements of Mathematics), the group's central work. Topics treated in the series include set theory, abstract algebra, topology, analysis, Lie groups, and Lie algebras.

Bourbaki was founded in response to the effects of the First World War which caused the death of a generation of French mathematicians; as a result, young university instructors were forced to use dated texts. While teaching at the University of Strasbourg, Henri Cartan complained to his colleague André Weil of the inadequacy of available course material, which prompted Weil to propose a meeting with others in Paris to collectively write a modern analysis textbook. The group's core founders were Cartan, Claude Chevalley, Jean Delsarte, Jean Dieudonné and Weil; others participated briefly during the group's early years, and membership has changed gradually over time. Although former members openly discuss their past involvement with the group, Bourbaki has a custom of keeping its current membership secret.

The group's name derives from the 19th-century French general Charles-Denis Bourbaki, who had a career of successful military campaigns before suffering a dramatic defeat in the Franco-Prussian War. The name was therefore familiar to early 20th-century French students. Weil remembered an ENS student prank in which an upperclassman posed as a professor and presented a "theorem of Bourbaki"; the name was later adopted.

The Bourbaki group holds regular private conferences for the purpose of drafting and expanding the Éléments. Topics are assigned to subcommittees, drafts are debated, and unanimous agreement is required before a text is deemed fit for publication. Although slow and labor-intensive, the process results in a work which meets the group's standards for rigour and generality. The group is associated with the Séminaire Bourbaki, a regular series of lectures presented by members and non-members of the group, also published and disseminated as written documents. Bourbaki maintains an office at the ENS.

Nicolas Bourbaki was influential in 20th-century mathematics, particularly during the middle of the century when volumes of the Éléments appeared frequently. The group is noted among mathematicians for its rigorous presentation and for introducing the notion of a mathematical structure, an idea related to the broader, interdisciplinary concept of structuralism. Bourbaki's work informed the New Math, a trend in elementary mathematical education during the 1960s. Although the group remains active, its influence is considered to have declined due to infrequent publication of new volumes of the Éléments. However, since 2012 the group as of 2026 had published five new or significantly revised volumes, including two new chapters on topological vector spaces in 2026, with at least two further volumes indicated to be in preparation.

== Background ==
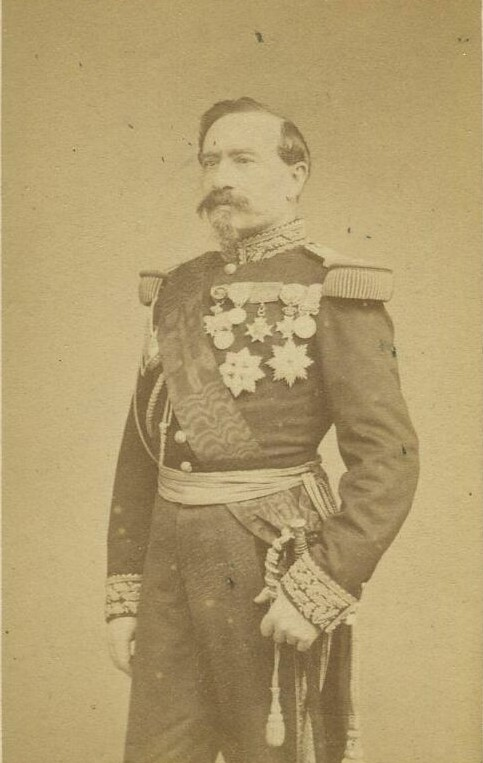
Charles-Denis Bourbaki, 19th-century general and namesake of the collective

Charles-Denis Sauter Bourbaki was a successful general during the era of Napoleon III, serving in the Crimean War and other conflicts. During the Franco-Prussian War however, Charles-Denis Bourbaki suffered a major defeat in which the Armée de l'Est, under his command, retreated across the Swiss border and was disarmed. The general unsuccessfully attempted suicide. The dramatic story of his defeat was known in the French popular consciousness following his death.

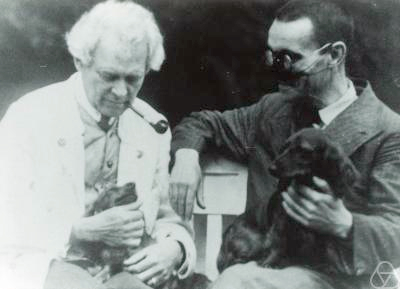
Gaston Julia (right), who was not a member of Bourbaki, lost his nose during World War I. The war created a lost generation of mathematical knowledge, which the Bourbaki founders sought to fill.

In the early 20th century, the First World War affected Europeans of all professions and social classes, including mathematicians and male students who fought and died in the front. For example, the French mathematician Gaston Julia, a pioneer in the study of fractals, lost his nose during the war and wore a leather strap over the affected part of his face for the rest of his life. The deaths of ENS students resulted in a lost generation in the French mathematical community; the estimated proportion of ENS mathematics students (and French students generally) who died in the war ranges from one-quarter to one-half, depending on the intervals of time (c. 1900–1918, especially 1910–1916) and populations considered. Furthermore, Bourbaki founder André Weil remarked in his memoir Apprenticeship of a Mathematician that France and Germany took different approaches with their intelligentsia during the war: while Germany protected its young students and scientists, France instead committed them to the front, owing to the French culture of egalitarianism.

A succeeding generation of mathematics students attended the ENS during the 1920s, including Weil and others, the future founders of Bourbaki. During his time as a student, Weil recalled a prank in which an upperclassman, Raoul Husson, posed as a professor and gave a math lecture, ending with a prompt: "Theorem of Bourbaki: you are to prove the following...". Weil was also aware of a similar stunt around 1910 in which a student claimed to be from the fictional, impoverished nation of "Poldevia" and solicited the public for donations. Weil had strong interests in languages and Indian culture, having learned Sanskrit and read the Bhagavad Gita. After graduating from the ENS and obtaining his doctorate, Weil took a teaching stint at the Aligarh Muslim University in India. While there, Weil met the mathematician Damodar Kosambi, who was engaged in a power struggle with one of his colleagues. Weil suggested that Kosambi write an article with material attributed to one "Bourbaki", in order to show off his knowledge to the colleague. Kosambi took the suggestion, attributing the material discussed in the article to "the little-known Russian mathematician D. Bourbaki, who was poisoned during the Revolution." It was the first article in the mathematical literature with material attributed to the eponymous "Bourbaki". Weil's stay in India was short-lived; he attempted to revamp the mathematics department at Aligarh, without success. The university administration planned to fire Weil and promote his colleague Vijayaraghavan to the vacated position. However, Weil and Vijayaraghavan respected one another. Rather than play any role in the drama, Vijayaraghavan instead resigned, later informing Weil of the plan. Weil returned to Europe to seek another teaching position. He ended up at the University of Strasbourg, joining his friend and colleague Henri Cartan.

== The Bourbaki collective ==
Bourbaki was founded to produce a text in mathematical analysis, a branch of mathematics entailing calculus

=== Founding ===
During their time together at Strasbourg, Weil and Cartan regularly complained to each other regarding the inadequacy of available course material for calculus instruction. In his memoir Apprenticeship, Weil described his solution in the following terms: "One winter day toward the end of 1934, I came upon a great idea that would put an end to these ceaseless interrogations by my comrade. 'We are five or six friends', I told him some time later, 'who are in charge of the same mathematics curriculum at various universities. Let us all come together and regulate these matters once and for all, and after this, I shall be delivered of these questions.' I was unaware of the fact that Bourbaki was born at that instant." Cartan confirmed the account.

The first, unofficial meeting of the Bourbaki collective took place at noon on Monday, 10 December 1934, at the Café Grill-Room A. Capoulade, Paris, in the Latin Quarter. (Note: The restaurant, which no longer exists, was at 63 Boulevard Saint-Michel.) Six mathematicians were present: Henri Cartan, Claude Chevalley, Jean Delsarte, Jean Dieudonné, René de Possel, and André Weil. Most of the group were based outside Paris and were in town to attend the Julia Seminar, a conference prepared with the help of Gaston Julia at which several future Bourbaki members and associates presented. (Note: The Julia Seminar was held every other Monday, in the afternoon. Bourbaki's early lunch meetings during 1934–1935 were typically held on the same Mondays, immediately before the Seminar.) The group resolved to collectively write a treatise on analysis, for the purpose of standardizing calculus instruction in French universities. The project was especially meant to supersede the text of Édouard Goursat, which the group found to be badly outdated, and to improve its treatment of Stokes' Theorem. The founders were also motivated by a desire to incorporate ideas from the Göttingen school, particularly from exponents Hilbert, Noether and B.L. van der Waerden. Further, in the aftermath of World War I, there was a certain nationalist impulse to save French mathematics from decline, especially in competition with Germany. As Dieudonné stated in an interview, "Without meaning to boast, I can say that it was Bourbaki that saved French mathematics from extinction."

Jean Delsarte was particularly favorable to the collective aspect of the proposed project, observing that such a working style could insulate the group's work against potential later individual claims of copyright. (Note: Delsarte's favorable view of a collective project was not recorded in the minutes of the first meeting. He is supposed to have expressed the view elsewhere, with Cartan and Weil eventually attributing the opinion to him. However, the opinion is closely associated with the working style of Bourbaki which eventually emerged.) As various topics were discussed, Delsarte also suggested that the work begin in the most abstract, axiomatic terms possible, treating all of mathematics prerequisite to analysis from scratch. The group agreed to the idea, and this foundational area of the proposed work was referred to as the "Abstract Packet" (Paquet Abstrait). Working titles were adopted: the group styled itself as the Committee for the Treatise on Analysis, and their proposed work was called the Treatise on Analysis (Traité d'analyse). In all, the collective held ten preliminary biweekly meetings at A. Capoulade before its first official, founding conference in July 1935. During this early period, Paul Dubreil, Jean Leray and Szolem Mandelbrojt joined and participated. Dubreil and Leray left the meetings before the following summer, and were respectively replaced by new participants Jean Coulomb and Charles Ehresmann.

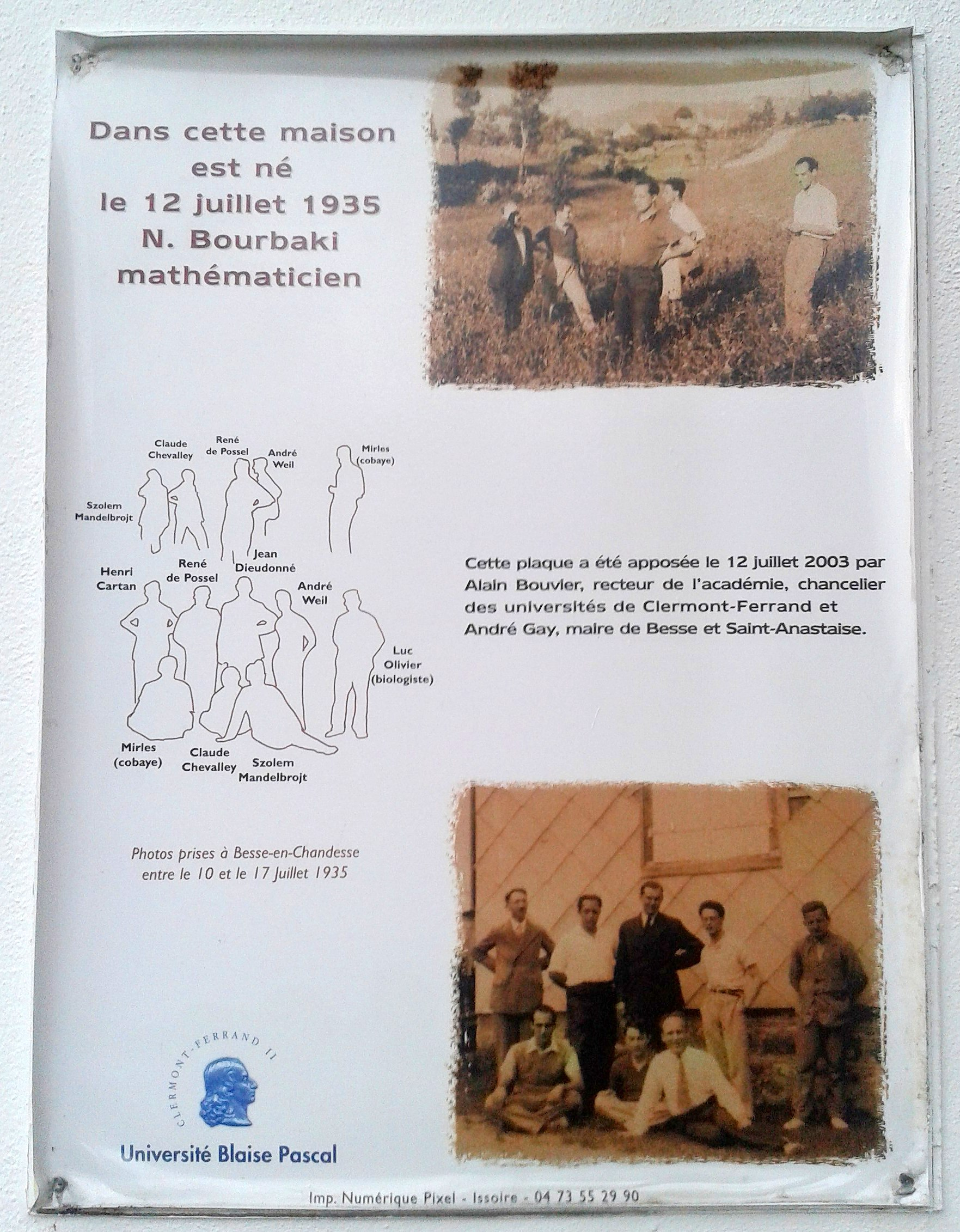
Sign marking the official founding of Bourbaki in Besse-en-Chandesse

The group's official founding conference was held in Besse-en-Chandesse, from 10 to 17 July 1935. At the time of the official founding, the membership consisted of the six attendees at the first lunch of 10 December 1934, together with Coulomb, Ehresmann and Mandelbrojt. On 16 July, the members took a walk to alleviate the boredom of unproductive proceedings. During the malaise, some decided to skinny-dip in the nearby Lac Pavin, repeatedly yelling "Bourbaki!" At the close of the first official conference, the group renamed itself "Bourbaki", in reference to the general and prank as recalled by Weil and others. (Note: The mathematician Sterling K. Berberian suggested another possible origin for the Bourbaki name: Octave Mirbeau's 1900 novel The Diary of a Chambermaid, which describes a hedgehog named Bourbaki that eats voraciously. However Mashaal dismissed this connection as being unlikely since the founders never referred to the novel, but only to the general and the Husson anecdote.) During 1935, the group also resolved to establish the mathematical personhood of their collective pseudonym by getting an article published under its name. A first name had to be decided; a full name was required for publication of any article. To this end, René de Possel's wife Eveline "baptized" the pseudonym with the first name of Nicolas, becoming Bourbaki's "godmother". This allowed for the publication of a second article with material attributed to Bourbaki, this time under "his" own name. Henri Cartan's father Élie Cartan, also a mathematician and supportive of the group, presented the article to the publishers, who accepted it.

At the time of Bourbaki's founding, René de Possel and his wife Eveline were in the process of divorcing. Eveline remarried to André Weil in 1937, and de Possel left the Bourbaki collective some time later. This sequence of events has caused speculation that de Possel left the group because of the remarriage, however this suggestion has also been criticized as possibly historically inaccurate, since de Possel is supposed to have remained active in Bourbaki for years after André's marriage to Eveline.

=== World War II ===
Bourbaki's work slowed significantly during the Second World War, though the group survived and later flourished. Some members of Bourbaki were Jewish and therefore forced to flee from certain parts of Europe at certain times. Weil, who was Jewish, spent the summer of 1939 in Finland with his wife Eveline, as guests of Lars Ahlfors. Due to their travel near the border, the couple were suspected as Soviet spies by Finnish authorities near the onset of the Winter War, and André was later arrested. According to an anecdote, Weil was to have been executed but for the passing mention of his case to Rolf Nevanlinna, who asked that Weil's sentence be commuted. However, the accuracy of this detail is dubious. Weil reached the United States in 1941, later taking another teaching stint in São Paulo from 1945 to 1947 before settling at the University of Chicago from 1947 to 1958 and finally the Institute for Advanced Study in Princeton, where he spent the remainder of his career. Although Weil remained in touch with the Bourbaki collective and visited Europe and the group periodically following the war, his level of involvement with Bourbaki never returned to that at the time of founding.

Second-generation Bourbaki member Laurent Schwartz was also Jewish and found pickup work as a math teacher in rural Vichy France. Moving from village to village, Schwartz planned his movements in order to evade capture by the Nazis. On one occasion Schwartz found himself trapped overnight in a certain village, as his expected transportation home was unavailable. There were two inns in town: a comfortable, well-appointed one, and a very poor one with no heating and bad beds. Schwartz's instinct told him to stay at the poor inn; overnight, the Nazis raided the good inn, leaving the poor inn unchecked.

Meanwhile, Jean Delsarte, a Catholic, was mobilized in 1939 as the captain of an audio reconnaissance battery. He was forced to lead the unit's retreat from the northeastern part of France toward the south. While passing near the Swiss border, Delsarte overheard a soldier say "We are the army of Bourbaki"; the 19th-century general's retreat was known to the French. Delsarte had coincidentally led a retreat similar to that of the collective's namesake.

=== Postwar until the present ===

Alexander Grothendieck proposed that Bourbaki revise its foundational basis in terms of category theory as opposed to set theory; the proposal was not adopted

Following the Second World War, Bourbaki had solidified the plan of its work and settled into a productive routine. Bourbaki regularly published volumes of the Éléments during the 1950s and 1960s, and enjoyed its greatest influence during this period. Over time the founding members gradually left the group, slowly being replaced with younger newcomers including Jean-Pierre Serre and Alexander Grothendieck. Serre, Grothendieck and Laurent Schwartz were awarded the Fields Medal during the postwar period, in 1954, 1966 and 1950 respectively. Later members Alain Connes and Jean-Christophe Yoccoz also received the Fields Medal, in 1982 and 1994 respectively.

The later practice of accepting scientific awards contrasted with some of the founders' views. During the 1930s, Weil and Delsarte petitioned against a French national scientific "medal system" proposed by the Nobel Prize in Physics laureate Jean Perrin. Weil and Delsarte felt that the institution of such a system would increase unconstructive pettiness and jealousy in the scientific community. Despite this, the Bourbaki group had previously successfully petitioned Perrin for a government grant to support its normal operations. Like the founders, Grothendieck was also averse to awards, albeit for pacifist reasons. Although Grothendieck was awarded the Fields Medal in 1966, he declined to attend the ceremony in Moscow, in protest of the Soviet government. In 1988, Grothendieck rejected the Crafoord Prize outright, citing no personal need to accept prize money, lack of recent relevant output, and general distrust of the scientific community.

Born to Jewish anarchist parentage, Grothendieck survived the Holocaust and advanced rapidly in the French mathematical community, despite poor education during the war. Grothendieck's teachers included Bourbaki's founders, and so he joined the group. During Grothendieck's membership, Bourbaki reached an impasse concerning its foundational approach. Grothendieck advocated for a reformulation of the group's work using category theory as its theoretical basis, as opposed to set theory. The proposal was ultimately rejected in part because the group had already committed itself to a rigid track of sequential presentation, with multiple already-published volumes. Following this, Grothendieck left Bourbaki "in anger". Biographers of the collective have described Bourbaki's unwillingness to start over in terms of category theory as a missed opportunity. However, Bourbaki has in 2023 announced that a book on category theory is currently under preparation (see below the last paragraph of this section).

During the founding period, the group chose the Parisian publisher Hermann to issue installments of the Éléments. Hermann was led by Enrique Freymann, a friend of the founders willing to publish the group's project, despite financial risk. During the 1970s, Bourbaki entered a protracted legal battle with Hermann over matters of copyright and royalty payment. Although the Bourbaki group won the suit and retained collective copyright of the Éléments, the dispute slowed the group's productivity. Former member Pierre Cartier described the lawsuit as a pyrrhic victory, saying: "As usual in legal battles, both parties lost and the lawyer got rich." Later editions of the Éléments were published by Masson, and modern editions are published by Springer. From the 1980s through the 2000s, Bourbaki published very infrequently, with the result that in 1998 Le Monde pronounced the collective "dead".

However, in 2012 Bourbaki resumed the publication of the Éléments with a revised chapter 8 of algebra, the first 4 chapters of a new book on algebraic topology, and two volumes on spectral theory (the first of which is an expanded and revised version of the edition of 1967 while the latter consist of three new chapters). Moreover, the text of the two latest volumes announces that books on category theory and modular forms are currently under preparation (in addition to the latter part of the book on algebraic topology).

== Working method ==
At Armand Borel's urging, Bourbaki's treatment of Lie groups and Lie algebras included uncharacteristic illustrations, such as graphs of finite Coxeter systems

Bourbaki holds periodic conferences for the purpose of expanding the Éléments; these conferences are the central activity of the group's working life. Subcommittees are assigned to write drafts on specific material, and the drafts are later presented, vigorously debated, and re-drafted at the conferences. Unanimous agreement is required before any material is deemed acceptable for publication. A given piece of material may require six or more drafts over a period of several years, and some drafts are never developed into completed work. Bourbaki's writing process has therefore been described as "Sisyphean". Although the method is slow, it yields a final product which satisfies the group's standards for mathematical rigour, one of Bourbaki's main priorities in the treatise. Bourbaki's emphasis on rigour was a reaction to the style of Henri Poincaré, who stressed the importance of free-flowing mathematical intuition at the cost of thorough presentation. (Note: "Bourbaki came to terms with Poincaré only after a long struggle. When I joined the group in the fifties it was not the fashion to value Poincaré at all. He was old-fashioned." —Pierre Cartier) During the project's early years, Dieudonné served as the group's scribe, authoring several final drafts which were ultimately published. For this purpose, Dieudonné adopted an impersonal writing style which was not his own, but which was used to craft material acceptable to the entire group. Dieudonné reserved his personal style for his own work; like all members of Bourbaki, Dieudonné also published material under his own name, including the nine-volume Éléments d'analyse, a work explicitly focused on analysis and of a piece with Bourbaki's initial intentions.

Most of the final drafts of Bourbaki's Éléments carefully avoided using illustrations, favoring a formal presentation based only in text and formulas. An exception to this was the treatment of Lie groups and Lie algebras (especially in chapters 4–6), which did make use of diagrams and illustrations. The inclusion of illustration in this part of the work was due to Armand Borel. Borel was minority-Swiss in a majority-French collective, and self-deprecated as "the Swiss peasant", explaining that visual learning was important to the Swiss national character. When asked about the dearth of illustration in the work, former member Pierre Cartier replied:

The Bourbaki were Puritans, and Puritans are strongly opposed to pictorial representations of truths of their faith. The number of Protestants and Jews in the Bourbaki group was overwhelming. And you know that the French Protestants especially are very close to Jews in spirit.

— Pierre Cartier

The conferences have historically been held at quiet rural areas. These locations contrast with the lively, sometimes heated debates which have occurred. Laurent Schwartz reported an episode in which Weil slapped Cartan on the head with a draft. The hotel's proprietor saw the incident and assumed that the group would split up, but according to Schwartz, "peace was restored within ten minutes." The historical, confrontational style of debate within Bourbaki has been partly attributed to Weil, who believed that new ideas have a better chance of being born in confrontation than in an orderly discussion. Schwartz related another illustrative incident: Dieudonné was adamant that topological vector spaces must appear in the work before integration, and whenever anyone suggested that the order be reversed, he would loudly threaten his resignation. This became an in-joke among the group; Roger Godement's wife Sonia attended a conference, aware of the idea, and asked for proof. As Sonia arrived at a meeting, a member suggested that integration must appear before topological vector spaces, which triggered Dieudonné's usual reaction.

Despite the historical culture of heated argument, Bourbaki thrived during the middle of the 20th century. Bourbaki's ability to sustain such a collective, critical approach has been described as "something unusual", surprising even its own members. In founder Henri Cartan's words, "That a final product can be obtained at all is a kind of miracle that none of us can explain." It has been suggested that the group survived because its members believed strongly in the importance of their collective project, despite personal differences. When the group overcame difficulties or developed an idea that they liked, they would sometimes say l'esprit a soufflé ("the spirit breathes"). Historian Liliane Beaulieu noted that the "spirit"—which might be an avatar, the group mentality in action, or Bourbaki "himself"—was part of an internal culture and mythology which the group used to form its identity and perform work.

=== Humor ===
Humor has been an important aspect of the group's culture, beginning with Weil's memories of the student pranks involving "Bourbaki" and "Poldevia". For example, in 1939 the group released a wedding announcement for the marriage of "Betti Bourbaki" (daughter of Nicolas) to one "H. Pétard" (H. "Firecrackers" or "Hector Pétard"), a "lion hunter". Hector Pétard was itself a pseudonym, but not one originally coined by the Bourbaki members. The Pétard moniker was originated by Ralph P. Boas, Frank Smithies and other Princeton mathematicians who were aware of the Bourbaki project; inspired by them, the Princeton mathematicians published an article on the "mathematics of lion hunting". After meeting Boas and Smithies, Weil composed the wedding announcement, which contained several mathematical puns. Bourbaki's internal newsletter La Tribu has sometimes been issued with humorous subtitles to describe a given conference, such as "The Extraordinary Congress of Old Fogies" (where anyone older than 30 was considered a fogey) or "The Congress of the Motorization of the Trotting Ass" (an expression used to describe the routine unfolding of a mathematical proof, or process).

During the 1940s–1950s, the American Mathematical Society received applications for individual membership from Bourbaki. They were rebuffed by J.R. Kline who understood the entity to be a collective, inviting them to re-apply for institutional membership. In response, Bourbaki floated a rumor that Ralph Boas was not a real person, but a collective pseudonym of the editors of Mathematical Reviews with which Boas had been affiliated. The reason for targeting Boas was because he had known the group in its earlier days when they were less strict with secrecy, and he'd described them as a collective in an article for the Encyclopædia Britannica. In November 1968, a mock obituary of Nicolas Bourbaki was released during one of the seminars.

The group developed some variants of the word "Bourbaki" for internal use. The noun "Bourbaki" might refer to the group proper or to an individual member, e.g. "André Weil was a Bourbaki." "Bourbakist" is sometimes used to refer to members but also denotes associates, supporters, and enthusiasts. To "bourbakize" meant to take a poor existing text and to improve it through an editing process.

Bourbaki's culture of humor has been described as an important factor in the group's social cohesion and capacity to survive, smoothing over tensions of heated debate. From 2018 to 2022, a Twitter account registered to "Betty_Bourbaki" provided regular updates on the group's activity.

== Works ==
Bourbaki's work includes a series of textbooks, a series of printed lecture notes, journal articles, and an internal newsletter. The textbook series Éléments de mathématique (Elements of mathematics) is the group's central work. The Séminaire Bourbaki is a lecture series held regularly under the group's auspices, and the talks given are also published as lecture notes. Journal articles have been published with authorship attributed to Bourbaki, and the group publishes an internal newsletter La Tribu (The Tribe) which is distributed to current and former members.

=== Éléments de mathématique ===
Like those before him, Bourbaki insisted on setting mathematics in a “formalized language” with crystal-clear deductions based on strict formal rules. When Bertrand Russell and Alfred North Whitehead applied this approach at the turn of the 20th century, they famously filled over 700 pages with formal symbols before establishing the proposition usually abbreviated as 1+1=2. Bourbaki's formalism would dwarf even this, requiring some 4.5 trillion symbols just to define the number 1.

— Michael Barany

The content of the Éléments is divided into books—major topics of discussion, volumes—individual, physical books, and chapters, together with certain summaries of results, historical notes, and other details. The volumes of the Éléments have had a complex publication history. Material has been revised for new editions, published chronologically out of order of its intended logical sequence, grouped together and partitioned differently in later volumes, and translated into English. For example, the second book on Algebra was originally released in eight French volumes: the first in 1942 being chapter 1 alone, and the last in 1980 being chapter 10 alone. This presentation was later condensed into five volumes with chapters 1–3 in the first volume, chapters 4–7 in the second, and chapters 8–10 each remaining the third through fifth volumes of that portion of the work. The English edition of Bourbaki's Algebra consists of translations of the three volumes consisting of chapters 1–3, 4–7 and 8, with chapters 9 and 10 unavailable in English as of 2026.

When Bourbaki's founders began working on the Éléments, they originally conceived of it as a "treatise on analysis", the proposed work having a working title of the same name (Traité d'analyse). The opening part was to comprehensively deal with the foundations of mathematics prior to analysis, and was referred to as the "Abstract Packet". Over time, the members developed this proposed "opening section" of the work to the point that it would instead run for several volumes and comprise a major part of the work, covering set theory, abstract algebra, and topology. Once the project's scope expanded far beyond its original purpose, the working title Traité d'analyse was dropped in favor of Éléments de mathématique. The unusual, singular "Mathematic" was meant to connote Bourbaki's belief in the unity of mathematics. The first six books of the Éléments, representing the first half of the work, are numbered sequentially and ordered logically, with a given statement being established only on the basis of earlier results. This first half of the work bore the subtitle Les structures fondamentales de l’analyse (Fundamental Structures of Analysis), covering established mathematics (algebra, analysis) in the group's style. The second half of the work consists of unnumbered books treating modern areas of research (Lie groups, commutative algebra), each presupposing the first half as a shared foundation but without dependence on each other. This second half of the work, consisting of newer research topics, does not have a corresponding subtitle.

The volumes of the Éléments published by Hermann were indexed by chronology of publication and referred to as fascicules: installments in a large work. Some volumes did not consist of the normal definitions, proofs, and exercises in a math textbook, but contained only summaries of results for a given topic, stated without proof. These volumes were referred to as Fascicules de résultats, with the result that fascicule may refer to a volume of Hermann's edition, or to one of the "summary" sections of the work (e.g. Fascicules de résultats is translated as "Summary of Results" rather than "Installment of Results", referring to the content rather than a specific volume). (Note: The mathematical historian Leo Corry also observed that the phrase "Summary of Results" is a misleading one for a distinct reason, instead referring to the content of the Éléments rather than the publication history of its volumes.) The first volume of Bourbaki's Éléments to be published was the Summary of Results in the Theory of Sets, in 1939. Similarly one of the work's later books, Differential and Analytic Manifolds, consisted only of two volumes of summaries of results, with no chapters of content having been published.

Later installments of the Éléments appeared infrequently during the 1980s and 1990s. A volume of Commutative Algebra (chapters 8–9) was published in 1983, and no other volumes were issued until the appearance of the same book's tenth chapter in 1998. During the 2010s, Bourbaki increased its productivity. A re-written and expanded version of the eighth chapter of Algebra appeared in 2012, the first four chapters of a new book treating Algebraic Topology was published in 2016, and the first two chapters of a revised and expanded edition of Spectral Theory was issued in 2019 while further three (completely new) chapters appeared in 2023. In 2026 appeared two new chapters of Topological Vector Spaces.

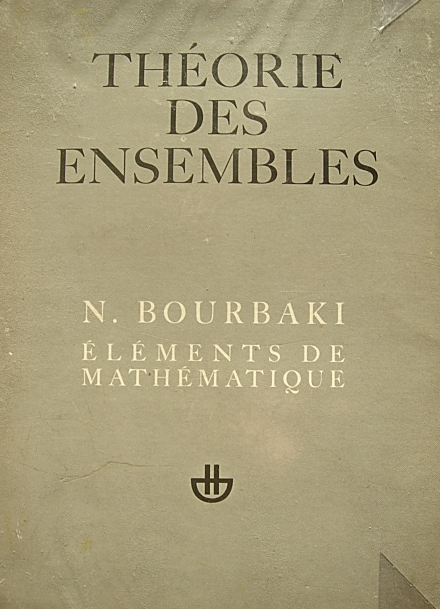
First book of the Éléments de mathématique, 1970 edition

Éléments de mathématique (Note: Years refer to the date of publication of each book's first volume, which also contains its first proper chapter. There are two exceptions: the first published installment of the Theory of Sets was a summary of results in 1939, and its first proper chapter did not appear until 1954. For Differential and Analytic Manifolds, only a two-volume summary of results was published in 1967 and 1971, with no proper chapters appearing.)
Year	Book	References
1954	Theory of Sets	
1942	Algebra	
1940	General Topology	
1949	Functions of a Real Variable	
1953	Topological Vector Spaces	
1952	Integration	
1960	Lie Groups and Lie Algebras	
1961	Commutative Algebra	
1967	Spectral Theory	
1967	Differential and Analytic Manifolds	
2016	Algebraic Topology	
1960	Elements of the History of Mathematics	

=== Séminaire Bourbaki ===
The Séminaire Bourbaki has been held regularly since 1948, and lectures are presented by non-members and members of the collective. As of 2026 the Séminaire Bourbaki has run to over a thousand recorded lectures in its written incarnation, denoted chronologically by simple numbers. At the time of a June 1999 lecture given by Jean-Pierre Serre on the topic of Lie groups, the total lectures given in the series numbered 864, corresponding to roughly 10,000 pages of printed material.

=== Articles ===
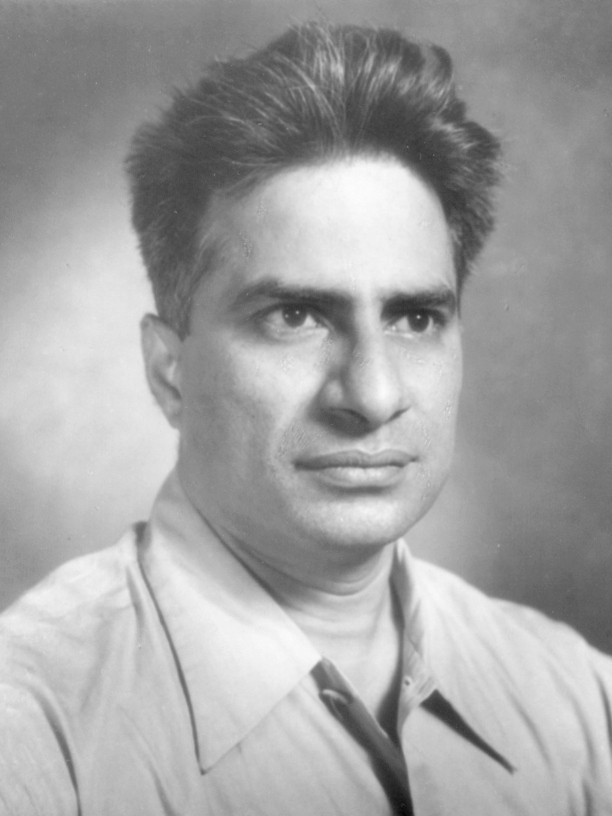
Damodar Kosambi authored the first article attributing material to "Bourbaki"

Several journal articles have appeared in the mathematical literature with material or authorship attributed to Bourbaki; unlike the Éléments, they were typically written by individual members and not crafted through the usual process of group consensus. Despite this, Jean Dieudonné's essay "The Architecture of Mathematics" has become known as Bourbaki's manifesto. Dieudonné addressed the issue of overspecialization in mathematics, to which he opposed the inherent unity of mathematic (as opposed to mathematics) and proposed mathematical structures as useful tools which can be applied to several subjects, showing their common features. To illustrate the idea, Dieudonné described three different systems in arithmetic and geometry and showed that all could be described as examples of a group, a specific kind of (algebraic) structure. Dieudonné described the axiomatic method as "the 'Taylor system' for mathematics" in the sense that it could be used to solve problems efficiently. (Note: Dieudonné immediately qualified the comparison as "a very poor analogy", continuing: "the mathematician does not work like a machine, nor as the workingman on a moving belt; we can not over-emphasize the fundamental role played in his research by a special intuition, which is not the popular sense-intuition, but rather a kind of direct divination... of the normal behavior... of mathematical beings.") Such a procedure would entail identifying relevant structures and applying established knowledge about the given structure to the specific problem at hand.

- Kosambi, D.D. (1931). "On a Generalization of the Second Theorem of Bourbaki". Bulletin of the Academy of Sciences of the United Provinces of Agra and Oudh, Allahabad, India. 1: 145–47. Reprinted in Ramaswamy, Ramakrishna, ed. (2016). D.D. Kosambi: Selected Works in Mathematics and Statistics. Springer. pp. 55–57. doi:10.1007/978-81-322-3676-4_6. ISBN 978-81-322-3674-0. Kosambi attributed material in the article to "D. Bourbaki", the first mention of the eponymous Bourbaki in the literature.
- Bourbaki, Nicolas (1935). "Sur un théorème de Carathéodory et la mesure dans les espaces topologiques". Comptes rendus de l'Académie des Sciences. 201: 1309–11. Presumptive author: André Weil.
- —— (1938). "Sur les espaces de Banach". Comptes rendus de l'Académie des Sciences. 206: 1701–04. Presumptive author: Jean Dieudonné.
- ——; Dieudonné, Jean (1939). "Note de tératopologie II". Revue scientifique (Or, "Revue rose"): 180–81. Presumptive author: Jean Dieudonné. Second in a series of three articles.
- —— (1941). "Espaces minimaux et espaces complètement séparés". Comptes rendus de l'Académie des Sciences. 212: 215–18. Presumptive author: Jean Dieudonné or André Weil.
- —— (1948). "L'architecture des mathématiques". In Le Lionnais, François (ed.). Les grands courants de la pensée mathématique. Actes Sud. pp. 35–47. Presumptive author: Jean Dieudonné.
- —— (1949). "Foundations of Mathematics for the Working Mathematician". Journal of Symbolic Logic. 14 (1): 1–8. doi:10.2307/2268971. JSTOR 2268971. S2CID 26516355. Presumptive author: André Weil.
- —— (1949). "Sur le théorème de Zorn". Archiv der Mathematik. 2 (6): 433–37. doi:10.1007/BF02036949. S2CID 117826806. Presumptive author: Henri Cartan or Jean Dieudonné.
- —— (1950). "The Architecture of Mathematics". American Mathematical Monthly. 57 (4): 221–32. doi:10.1080/00029890.1950.11999523. JSTOR 2305937. Presumptive author: Jean Dieudonné. Authorized translation of the book chapter L'architecture des mathématiques, appearing in English as a journal article.
- —— (1950). "Sur certains espaces vectoriels topologiques". Annales de l'Institut Fourier. 2: 5–16. doi:10.5802/aif.16. Presumptive authors: Jean Dieudonné and Laurent Schwartz.

=== La Tribu ===
La Tribu is Bourbaki's internal newsletter, distributed to current and former members. The newsletter usually documents recent conferences and activity in a humorous, informal way, sometimes including poetry. Member Pierre Samuel wrote the newsletter's narrative sections for several years. Early editions of La Tribu and related documents have been made publicly available by Bourbaki.

Historian Liliane Beaulieu examined La Tribu and Bourbaki's other writings, describing the group's humor and private language as an "art of memory" which is specific to the group and its chosen methods of operation. Because of the group's secrecy and informal organization, individual memories are sometimes recorded in a fragmentary way, and may not have significance to other members. On the other hand, the predominantly French, ENS background of the members, together with stories of the group's early period and successes, create a shared culture and mythology which is drawn upon for group identity. La Tribu usually lists the members present at a conference, together with any visitors, family members or other friends in attendance. Humorous descriptions of location or local "props" (cars, bicycles, binoculars, etc.) can also serve as mnemonic devices.

== Membership ==
As of 2000, Bourbaki has had "about forty" members. Historically the group has numbered about ten to twelve members at any given point, although it was briefly (and officially) limited to nine members at the time of founding. Bourbaki's membership has been described in terms of generations:

Bourbaki was always a very small group of mathematicians, typically numbering about twelve people. Its first generation was that of the founding fathers, those who created the group in 1934: Weil, Cartan, Chevalley, Delsarte, de Possel, and Dieudonné. Others joined the group, and others left its ranks, so that some years later there were about twelve members, and that number remained roughly constant. Laurent Schwartz was the only mathematician to join Bourbaki during the war, so his is considered an intermediate generation. After the war, a number of members joined: Jean-Pierre Serre, Pierre Samuel, Jean-Louis Koszul, Jacques Dixmier, Roger Godement, and Sammy Eilenberg. These people constituted the second generation of Bourbaki. In the 1950s, the third generation of mathematicians joined Bourbaki. These people included Alexandre Grothendieck, François Bruhat, Serge Lang, the American mathematician John Tate, Pierre Cartier, and the Swiss mathematician Armand Borel.

After the first three generations there were roughly twenty later members, not including current participants. Bourbaki has a custom of keeping its current membership secret, a practice meant to ensure that its output is presented as a collective, unified effort under the Bourbaki pseudonym, not attributable to any one author (e.g. for purposes of copyright or royalty payment). This secrecy is also intended to deter unwanted attention which could disrupt normal operations. However, former members freely discuss Bourbaki's internal practices upon departure.

Prospective members are invited to conferences and styled as guinea pigs, a process meant to vet the newcomer's mathematical ability. In the event of agreement between the group and the prospect, the prospect eventually becomes a full member. (Note: Examples of guinea pigs who attended conferences without necessarily joining include one "Mirlès", who attended the official founding conference in Besse-en-Chandesse, Marcel Berger, Jean Giraud, Bernard Malgrange, and René Thom. Other guinea pigs and visitors have also been listed.) The group is supposed to have an age limit: active members are expected to retire at (or about) 50 years of age. At a 1956 conference, Cartan read a letter from Weil which proposed a "gradual disappearance" of the founding members, forcing younger members to assume full responsibility for Bourbaki's operations. This rule is supposed to have resulted in a complete change of personnel by 1958. However, historian Liliane Beaulieu has been critical of the claim. She reported never having found written affirmation of the rule, and has indicated that there have been exceptions. The age limit is thought to express the founders' intent that the project should continue indefinitely, operated by people at their best mathematical ability—in the mathematical community, there is a widespread belief that mathematicians produce their best work while young. Among full members there is no official hierarchy; all operate as equals, having the ability to interrupt conference proceedings at any point, or to challenge any material presented. However, André Weil has been described as "first among equals" during the founding period, and was given some deference. On the other hand, the group has also poked fun at the idea that older members should be afforded greater respect.

Bourbaki conferences have also been attended by members' family, friends, visiting mathematicians, and other non-members of the group. (Note: In 1948 one Nicolaidis Bourbaki, a diplomat and relative of the eponymous French general, sought the group out to understand why the family name had been taken. The diplomat and the mathematical collective met on friendly terms, and Nicolaidis was a dinner guest at some of the group's conferences.) Bourbaki is not known ever to have had any female members.

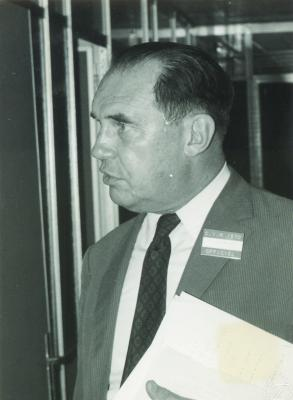
Jean Dieudonné, founding member

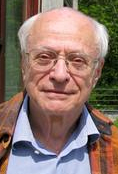
Jean-Pierre Serre, second generation member

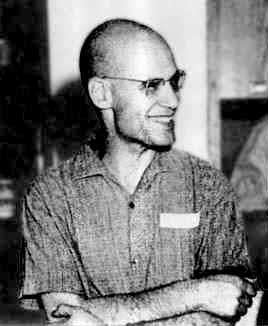
Alexander Grothendieck, third generation member, left Bourbaki largely over a disagreement about incorporation of category theory in the treatise

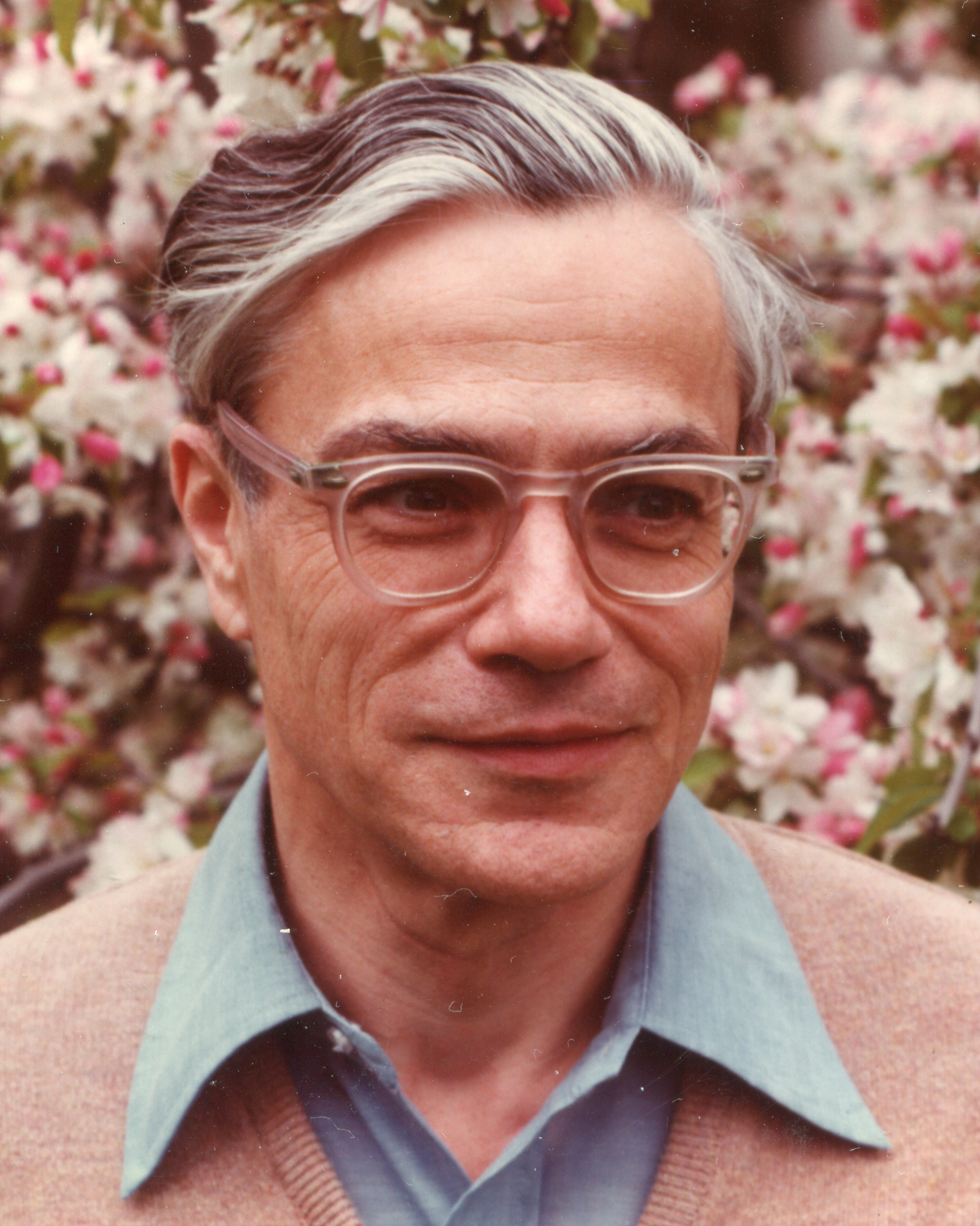
Armand Borel, third generation member

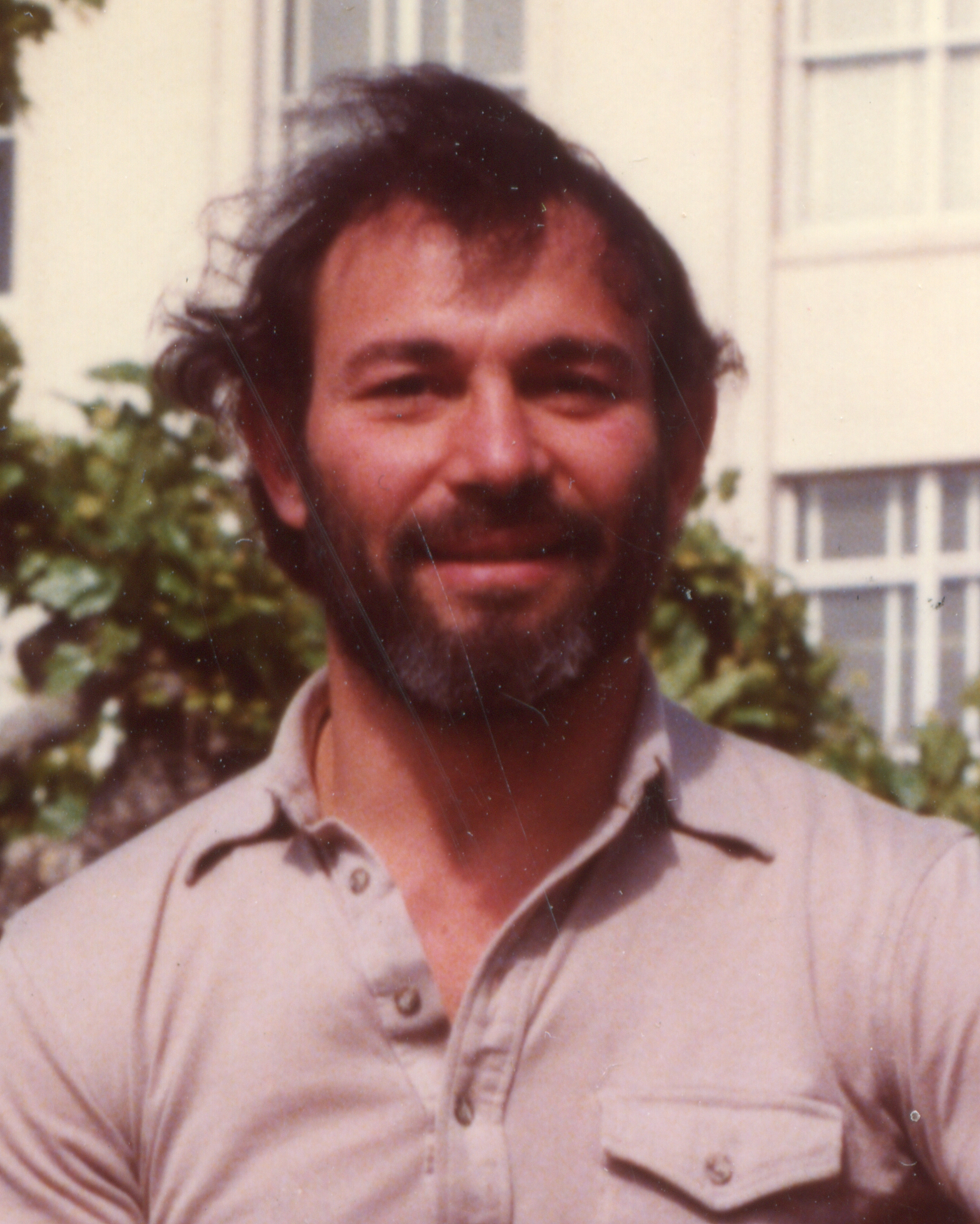
Hyman Bass, later member

Former members of the Nicolas Bourbaki collective
Generation		Name	Born	ENS (Note: Dates refer to entrance into the university, not graduation.)	Joined (Note: Bourbaki's secrecy and informality have made it difficult to establish members' dates of joining and leaving. For past members with uncertain dates, it has been suggested that the members' periods of flourishing (c. age 25–50) is the best available estimate.) (Note: Some members attended conferences as guinea pigs for a period of years before becoming full members. Armand Borel began attending Bourbaki conferences c. 1949, becoming a full member c. 1953 and departing in 1973. Pierre Cartier first attended a Bourbaki conference as a guinea pig in 1951, becoming a full member in 1955 and departing in 1983. Where sources make a distinction, the date of full membership is given or approximated.)	Left	Died
First (Note: The collective's founding generation included a core group of five who led its activities and established its norms, remaining active for several years. Another six minor members participated on shorter-term bases during its earliest days, ranging from a few months to a few years.)	Core members	Henri Cartan	1904	1923	1934	c. 1956–58	2008
First	Core members	Claude Chevalley	1909	1926	1934	c. 1956–58	1984
First	Core members	Jean Delsarte	1903	1922	1934	c. 1956–58	1968
First	Core members	Jean Dieudonné	1906	1924	1934	c. 1956–58	1992
First	Core members	André Weil	1906	1922	1934	c. 1956–58	1998
First	Minor members	Jean Coulomb	1904	1923	1935	1937	1999
First	Minor members	Paul Dubreil	1904	1923	1935	1935	1994
First	Minor members	Charles Ehresmann	1905	1924	1935	1950	1979
First	Minor members	Jean Leray	1906	1926	1935	1935	1998
First	Minor members	Szolem Mandelbrojt	1899	—	1935	—	1983
First	Minor members	René de Possel	1905	1923	1934	—	1974
Second (Note: Aczel described Schwartz as an inter-generational member, the only one to join during the Second World War. However Schwartz did not participate in the group's founding.)		Jacques Dixmier	1924	1942	—	—	—
Second		Samuel Eilenberg	1913	—	1950	1966	1998
Second		Roger Godement	1921	1940	—	—	2016
Second		Jean-Louis Koszul	1921	1940	—	—	2018
Second		Pierre Samuel	1921	1940	1947	1971	2009
Second		Laurent Schwartz	1916	1934	—	—	2002
Second		Jean-Pierre Serre	1926	1945	1949	1972	—
Third		Armand Borel	1923	—	c. 1953	1973	2003
Third		François Bruhat	1929	1948	—	—	2007
Third		Pierre Cartier	1932	1950	1955	1983	2024
Third		Alexander Grothendieck	1928	—	1955	1960	2014
Third		Serge Lang	1927	—	—	—	2005
Third		John Tate	1925	—	—	—	2019
Later members (Note: Most other members were born after the above three generations and were therefore active in the group at later dates. However, two were born contemporaries of the founding generation: Charles Pisot in 1909, and Claude Chabauty in 1910.) (Note: Cartier and Aczel also described a fourth generation of Bourbaki members (as opposed to later members in general), former students of Grothendieck who joined during the 1960s. This may refer to those of Grothendieck's doctoral students who later became Bourbaki members, such as Michel Demazure and Jean-Louis Verdier.)		Hyman Bass	1932	—	—	—	—
Later members		Arnaud Beauville	1947	1966	—	1997	—
Later members		Gérard Ben Arous	1957	1977	—	—	—
Later members		Daniel Bennequin	1952	1972	—	—	—
Later members		Claude Chabauty	1910	1929	—	—	1990
Later members		Alain Connes	1947	1966	—	—	—
Later members		Michel Demazure	1937	1955	—	c. 1985	—
Later members		Adrien Douady	1935	1954	—	—	2006
Later members		Patrick Gérard[fr]	1961	1981	—	—	—
Later members		Guy Henniart	1953	1973	—	—	—
Later members		Luc Illusie	1940	1959	—	—	—
Later members		Pierre Julg	1959	1977	—	—	—
Later members		Gilles Lebeau	1954	1974	—	—	—
Later members		André Martineau	1930	1949	—	—	1972
Later members		Olivier Mathieu	1960	1980	1989	c. 2010	—
Later members		Louis Boutet de Monvel	1941	1960	1971	1991	2014
Later members		Joseph Oesterlé	1954	1973	—	—	—
Later members		Charles Pisot	1909	1929	—	—	1984
Later members		Michel Raynaud	1938	1958	—	—	2018
Later members		Marc Rosso	1962	1982	—	—	—
Later members		Georges Skandalis	1955	1975	—	—	—
Later members		Bernard Teissier	1945	—	—	—	—
Later members		Jean-Louis Verdier	1937	1955	—	—	1989
Later members		Jean-Christophe Yoccoz	1957	1975	c. 1995	c. 1995	2016

== Influence and criticism ==
Bourbaki was influential in 20th-century mathematics and had some interdisciplinary impact on the humanities and the arts, although the extent of the latter influence is a matter of dispute. The group has been praised and criticized for its method of presentation, its working style, and its choice of mathematical topics.

=== Influence ===

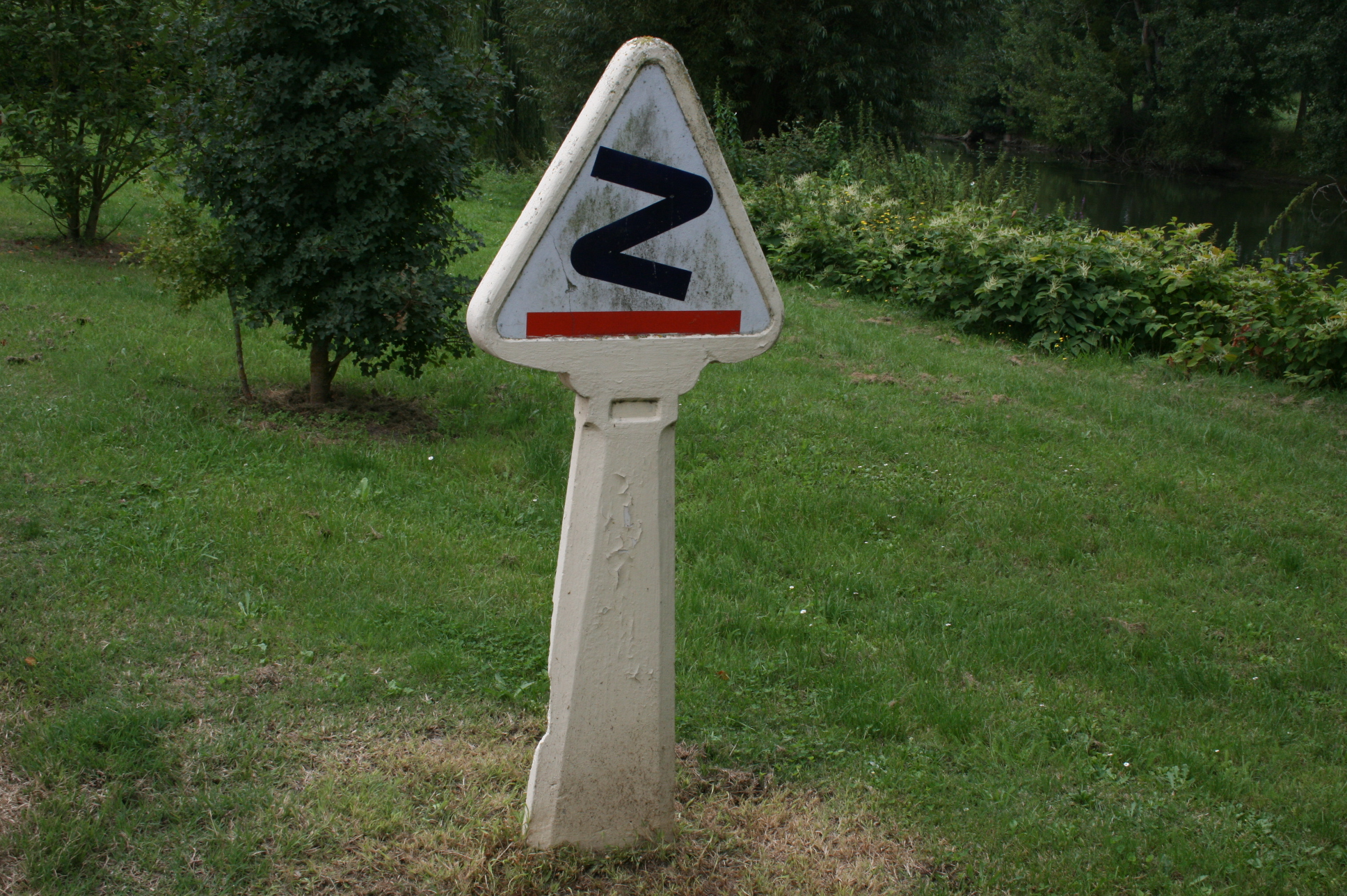
Bourbaki introduced notations for the empty set, as well as a dangerous bend symbol meant to indicate difficult material

Bourbaki introduced several mathematical notations which have remained in use. Weil took the letter Ø of the Norwegian alphabet and used it to denote the empty set, ∅. This notation first appeared in the Summary of Results on the Theory of Sets, and remains in use. The words injective, surjective and bijective were introduced to refer to functions which satisfy certain properties. Bourbaki used simple language for certain geometric objects, naming them pavés (paving stones) and boules (balls) as opposed to "parallelotopes" or "hyperspheroids". Similarly in its treatment of topological vector spaces, Bourbaki defined a barrel as a set which is convex, balanced, absorbing, and closed. The group were proud of this definition, believing that the shape of a wine barrel typified the mathematical object's properties. Bourbaki also employed a "dangerous bend" symbol ☡ in the margins of its text to indicate an especially difficult piece of material. Bourbaki enjoyed its greatest influence during the 1950s and 1960s, when installments of the Éléments were published frequently.

Bourbaki had some interdisciplinary influence on other fields, including anthropology and psychology. This influence was in the context of structuralism, a school of thought in the humanities which stresses the relationships between objects over the objects themselves, pursued in various fields by other French intellectuals. In 1943, André Weil met the anthropologist Claude Lévi-Strauss in New York, where the two undertook a brief collaboration. At Lévi-Strauss' request, Weil wrote a brief appendix describing marriage rules for four classes of people within Aboriginal Australian society, using a mathematical model based on group theory. The result was published as an appendix in Lévi-Strauss' Elementary Structures of Kinship, a work examining family structures and the incest taboo in human cultures. In 1952, Jean Dieudonné and Jean Piaget participated in an interdisciplinary conference on mathematical and mental structures. Dieudonné described mathematical "mother structures" in terms of Bourbaki's project: composition, neighborhood, and order. Piaget then gave a talk on children's mental processes, and considered that the psychological concepts he had just described were very similar to the mathematical ones just described by Dieudonné. According to Piaget, the two were "impressed with each other". The psychoanalyst Jacques Lacan liked Bourbaki's collaborative working style and proposed a similar collective group in psychology, an idea which did not materialize.

Bourbaki was also cited by post-structuralist philosophers. In their joint work Anti-Oedipus, Gilles Deleuze and Félix Guattari presented a criticism of capitalism. The authors cited Bourbaki's use of the axiomatic method (with the purpose of establishing truth) as a distinct counter-example to management processes which instead seek economic efficiency. The authors said of Bourbaki's axiomatics that "they do not form a Taylor system", inverting the phrase used by Dieudonné in "The Architecture of Mathematics". In The Postmodern Condition, Jean-François Lyotard criticized the "legitimation of knowledge", the process by which statements become accepted as valid. As an example, Lyotard cited Bourbaki as a group which produces knowledge within a given system of rules. Lyotard contrasted Bourbaki's hierarchical, "structuralist" mathematics with the catastrophe theory of René Thom and the fractals of Benoit Mandelbrot, (Note: Mandelbrot was the nephew of Bourbaki founder Szolem Mandelbrojt. Like early Bourbaki associate Gaston Julia, Mandelbrot also worked on fractals.) expressing preference for the latter "postmodern science" which problematized mathematics with "fracta, catastrophes, and pragmatic paradoxes".

Although biographer Amir Aczel stressed Bourbaki's influence on other disciplines during the mid-20th century, Maurice Mashaal moderated the claims of Bourbaki's influence in the following terms:

While Bourbaki's structures were often mentioned in social science conferences and publications of the era, it seems that they didn't play a real role in the development of these disciplines. David Aubin, a science historian who analyzed Bourbaki's role in the structuralist movement in France, believes Bourbaki's role was that of a "cultural connector". According to Aubin, while Bourbaki didn't have any mission outside of mathematics, the group represented a sort of link between the various cultural movements of the time. Bourbaki provided a simple and relatively precise definition of concepts and structures, which philosophers and social scientists believed was fundamental within their disciplines and in bridges among different areas of knowledge. Despite the superficial nature of these links, the various schools of structuralist thinking, including Bourbaki, were able to support each other. So, it is not a coincidence that these schools suffered a simultaneous decline in the late 1960s.

— Maurice Mashaal, citing David Aubin (Note: Maurice Mashaal and Amir Aczel each wrote separate biographies on Bourbaki, both published in 2006. In a review of both books, Michael Atiyah wrote that "the basic historical facts are well known and are set out in both the books under review". However Atiyah identified Mashaal's book as the better of the two and criticized Aczel's book, writing: "I was not convinced of the total reliability of its (Aczel's) sources, nor of its philosophical credentials." Atiyah also wrote that the collaboration between Weil and Lévi-Strauss was a "slightly tenuous link" which Aczel used to make "grand" claims on the scale of Bourbaki's interdisciplinary influence.) (Note: In a 2011 letter to the Mathematical Intelligencer, the mathematician Jean-Michel Kantor[de] was harshly critical of the notion that Bourbaki's mathematical structures had anything to do with the structuralism of the humanities, rejecting the connections made by Aczel in 2006. Kantor observed that the two versions of structuralism had developed independently of one another, and that Lévi-Strauss' conception of structure had derived from the Prague circle of linguistics, not from Bourbaki. On the other hand, Aczel had already acknowledged the linguistic origins of the structuralism of the humanities. In 1997 David Aubin had pre-emptively moderated both extremes, observing that the two schools of thought had distinct origins, but also had certain interactions and "common features". Aubin also cited Lévi-Strauss to show that the latter had reached certain conclusions in anthropology independently of Weil's mathematical help, although Weil's help provided confirmation of Lévi-Strauss' conclusions. This undermined Aczel's argument that mathematics and Bourbaki played an important role in the development of structuralism in the humanities, although Aubin also stressed that the two schools had some collaboration.)

The impact of "structuralism" on mathematics itself was also criticized. The mathematical historian Leo Corry argued that Bourbaki's use of mathematical structures was unimportant within the Éléments, having been established in Theory of Sets and cited infrequently afterwards. Corry described the "structural" view of mathematics promoted by Bourbaki as an "image of knowledge"—a conception about a scientific discipline—as opposed to an item in the discipline's "body of knowledge", which refers to the actual scientific results in the discipline itself.

Bourbaki also had some influence in the arts. The literary collective Oulipo was founded on 24 November 1960 under circumstances similar to Bourbaki's founding, with the members initially meeting in a restaurant. Although several members of Oulipo were mathematicians, the group's purpose was to create experimental literature by playing with language. Oulipo frequently employed mathematically-based constrained writing techniques, such as the S+7 method. Oulipo member Raymond Queneau attended a Bourbaki conference in 1962.

In 2016, an anonymous group of economists collaboratively wrote a note alleging academic misconduct by the authors and editor of a paper published in the American Economic Review. The note was published under the name Nicolas Bearbaki in homage to Nicolas Bourbaki.

In 2018, the American musical duo Twenty One Pilots released a concept album named Trench. The album's conceptual framework was the mythical city of "Dema" ruled by nine "bishops"; one of the bishops was named "Nico", short for Nicolas Bourbaki. Another of the bishops was named Andre, which may refer to André Weil. Following the album's release, there was a spike in internet searches for "Nicolas Bourbaki". The Ø has been seen in the duo's branding and the "dangerous bend symbol" was mentioned in the song Overcompensate. (Note: Similarly, Bourbaki created nicknames for its members. Jean Delsarte was referred to as "bishop", which may have been a reference to his Catholicism.)

=== Praise ===
Bourbaki's work has been praised by some mathematicians. In a book review, Emil Artin described the Éléments in broad, positive terms:

Our time is witnessing the creation of a monumental work: an exposition of the whole of present day mathematics. Moreover this exposition is done in such a way that the common bond between the various branches of mathematics become clearly visible, that the framework which supports the whole structure is not apt to become obsolete in a very short time, and that it can easily absorb new ideas.

— Emil Artin

Among the volumes of the Éléments, Bourbaki's work on Lie Groups and Lie Algebras has been identified as "excellent", having become a standard reference on the topic. In particular, former member Armand Borel described the volume with chapters 4–6 as "one of the most successful books by Bourbaki". The success of this part of the work has been attributed to the fact that the books were composed while leading experts on the topic were Bourbaki members.

Jean-Pierre Bourguignon expressed appreciation for the Séminaire Bourbaki, saying that he'd learned a large amount of material at its lectures, and referred to its printed lecture notes regularly. He also praised the Éléments for containing "some superb and very clever proofs".

=== Criticism ===
Bourbaki has also been criticized by several mathematicians—including its own former members—for a variety of reasons. Criticisms have included the choice of presentation of certain topics within the Éléments at the expense of others, (Note: This specific point has itself been criticized. It has been observed that it is unfair to criticize a work on a given topic for not dealing with other topics.) dislike of the method of presentation for given topics, dislike of the group's working style, and a perceived elitist mentality around Bourbaki's project and its books, especially during the collective's most productive years in the 1950s and 1960s.

Bourbaki's deliberations on the Éléments resulted in the inclusion of some topics, while others were not treated. When asked in a 1997 interview about topics left out of the Éléments, former member Pierre Cartier replied:

There is essentially no analysis beyond the foundations: nothing about partial differential equations, nothing about probability. There is also nothing about combinatorics, nothing about algebraic topology, (Note: Bourbaki has since published a book on algebraic topology.) nothing about concrete geometry. And Bourbaki never seriously considered logic. Dieudonné himself was very vocal against logic. Anything connected with mathematical physics is totally absent from Bourbaki's text.

— Pierre Cartier

Although Bourbaki had resolved to treat mathematics from its foundations, the group's eventual solution in terms of set theory was attended by several problems. Bourbaki's members were mathematicians as opposed to logicians, and therefore the collective had a limited interest in mathematical logic. As Bourbaki's members themselves said of the book on set theory, it was written "with pain and without pleasure, but we had to do it." Dieudonné personally remarked elsewhere that ninety-five percent of mathematicians "don't care a fig" for mathematical logic. In response, logician Adrian Mathias harshly criticized Bourbaki's foundational framework, noting that it did not take Gödel's results into account.

Bourbaki also influenced the New Math, a failed reform in Western mathematics education at the elementary and secondary levels, which stressed abstraction over concrete examples. During the mid-20th century, reform in basic math education was spurred by a perceived need to create a mathematically literate workforce for the modern economy, and also to compete with the Soviet Union. In France, this led to the Lichnerowicz Commission of 1967, headed by André Lichnerowicz and including some (then-current and former) Bourbaki members. Although Bourbaki members had previously (and individually) reformed math instruction at the university level, they had less direct involvement with implementation of the New Math at the primary and secondary levels. New Math reforms resulted in instructional material which was incomprehensible to both students and teachers, failing to meet the cognitive needs of younger students. The attempted reform was harshly criticized by Dieudonné and also by brief founding Bourbaki participant Jean Leray. Apart from French mathematicians, the French reforms also met with harsh criticism from Soviet-born mathematician Vladimir Arnold, who argued that in his time as a student and teacher in Moscow, the teaching of mathematics was firmly rooted in analysis and geometry, and interweaved with problems from classical mechanics; hence, the French reforms cannot be a legitimate attempt to emulate Soviet scientific education. In 1997, while speaking to a conference on mathematical teaching in Paris, he commented on Bourbaki by stating: "genuine mathematicians do not gang up, but the weak need gangs in order to survive" and suggested that Bourbaki's bonding over "super-abstractness" was similar to groups of mathematicians in the 19th century who had bonded over anti-Semitism.

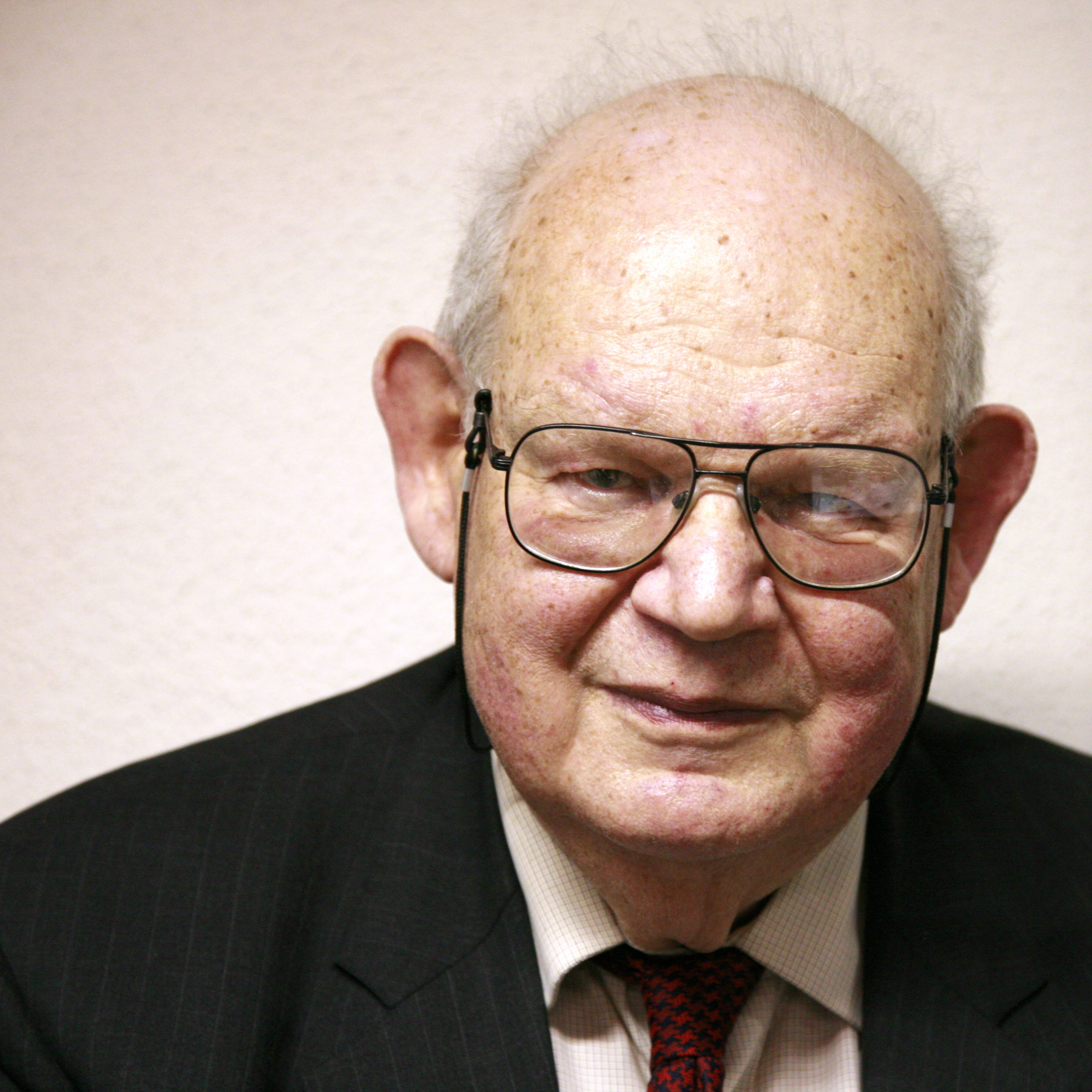
Benoit Mandelbrot was among Bourbaki's critics

Dieudonné later regretted that Bourbaki's success had contributed to a snobbery for pure mathematics in France, at the expense of applied mathematics. In an interview, he said: "It is possible to say that there was no serious applied mathematics in France for forty years after Poincaré. There was even a snobbery for pure math. When one noticed a talented student, one would tell him 'You should do pure math.' On the other hand, one would advise a mediocre student to do applied math while thinking, "It's all that he can do! ... The truth is actually the reverse. You can't do good work in applied math until you can do good work in pure math." Claude Chevalley confirmed an elitist culture within Bourbaki, describing it as "an absolute certainty of our superiority over other mathematicians." Alexander Grothendieck also confirmed an elitist mentality within Bourbaki. Some mathematicians, especially geometers and applied mathematicians, found Bourbaki's influence to be stifling. Benoit Mandelbrot's decision to emigrate to the United States in 1958 was motivated in part by a desire to escape Bourbaki's influence in France.

Several related criticisms of the Éléments have concerned its target audience and the intent of its presentation. Volumes of the Éléments begin with a note to the reader which says that the series "takes up mathematics at the beginning, and gives complete proofs" and that "the method of exposition we have chosen is axiomatic and abstract, and normally proceeds from the general to the particular." Despite the opening language, Bourbaki's intended audience are not absolute beginners in mathematics, but rather undergraduates, graduate students, and professors who are familiar with mathematical concepts. Claude Chevalley said that the Éléments are "useless for a beginner", and Pierre Cartier clarified that "The misunderstanding was that it should be a textbook for everybody. That was the big disaster."

The work is divided into two halves. While the first half—the Structures fondamentales de l’analyse—treats established subjects, the second half deals with modern research areas like commutative algebra and spectral theory. This divide in the work is related to a historical change in the intent of the treatise. The Éléments' content consists of theorems, proofs, exercises and related commentary, common material in math textbooks. Despite this presentation, the first half was not written as original research but rather as a reorganized presentation of established knowledge. In this sense, the Éléments' first half was more akin to an encyclopedia than a textbook series. As Cartier remarked, "The misunderstanding was that many people thought it should be taught the way it was written in the books. You can think of the first books of Bourbaki as an encyclopedia of mathematics... If you consider it as a textbook, it's a disaster."

The strict, ordered presentation of material in the Éléments' first half was meant to form the basis for any further additions. However, developments in modern mathematical research have proven difficult to adapt in terms of Bourbaki's organizational scheme. This difficulty has been attributed to the fluid, dynamic nature of ongoing research which, being new, is not settled or fully understood. Bourbaki's style has been described as a particular scientific paradigm which has been superseded in a paradigm shift. For example, Ian Stewart cited Vaughan Jones' novel work in knot theory as an example of topology which was done without dependence on Bourbaki's system. Bourbaki's influence has declined over time; this decline has been partly attributed to the absence of certain modern topics—such as category theory—from the treatise.

Although multiple criticisms have pointed to shortcomings in the collective's project, one has also pointed to its strength: Bourbaki was a "victim of its own success" in the sense that it accomplished what it set out to do, achieving its original goal of presenting a thorough treatise on modern mathematics. These factors prompted biographer Maurice Mashaal to conclude his treatment of Bourbaki in the following terms:

Such an enterprise deserves admiration for its breadth, for its enthusiasm and selflessness, for its strongly collective character. Despite some mistakes, Bourbaki did add a little to 'the honor of the human spirit'. In an era when sports and money are such great idols of civilization, this is no small virtue.

— Maurice Mashaal

== See also ==
- Bourbaki–Witt theorem
- Jacobson–Bourbaki theorem
- Secret society

Other collective mathematical pseudonyms

- Arthur Besse
- Blanche Descartes
- John Rainwater
- G. W. Peck

== Bibliography ==
- Aczel, Amir D. (2006). The Artist and the Mathematician: the Story of Nicolas Bourbaki, the Genius Mathematician Who Never Existed. Thunder's Mouth Press. ISBN 978-1560259312.
- Aubin, David (1997). "The Withering Immortality of Nicolas Bourbaki: A Cultural Connector at the Confluence of Mathematics, Structuralism, and the Oulipo in France" (PDF). Science in Context. 10 (2). Cambridge University Press: 297–342. doi:10.1017/S0269889700002660. S2CID 170683589.
- Beaulieu, Liliane (1993). "A Parisian Café and Ten Proto-Bourbaki Meetings (1934–1935)". The Mathematical Intelligencer. 15 (1): 27–35. doi:10.1007/BF03025255. S2CID 189888171.
- Beaulieu, Liliane (1999). "Bourbaki's Art of Memory" (PDF). Osiris. 14: 219–51. doi:10.1086/649309. S2CID 143559711.
- Borel, Armand (March 1998). "Twenty-Five Years with Nicolas Bourbaki, (1949–1973)" (PDF). Notices of the American Mathematical Society. 45 (3): 373–80.
- Bourbaki, Nicolas (1950). "The Architecture of Mathematics". American Mathematical Monthly. 57 (4): 221–32. doi:10.1080/00029890.1950.11999523. JSTOR 2305937. Presumptive author: Jean Dieudonné. Authorized translation of the book chapter L'architecture des mathématiques, appearing in English as a journal article.
- Corry, Leo (2004). "Nicolas Bourbaki: Theory of Structures". Modern Algebra and the Rise of Mathematical Structures. Springer. pp. 289–338. ISBN 978-3764370022.
- Corry, Leo (2009). "Writing the Ultimate Mathematical Textbook: Nicolas Bourbaki's Éléments de mathématique". In Robson, Eleanor; Stedall, Jacqueline (eds.). The Oxford Handbook of the History of Mathematics. Oxford University Press. pp. 565–87. ISBN 978-0199213122.
- Guedj, Denis (1985). "Nicholas Bourbaki, Collective Mathematician : an Interview with Claude Chevalley" (PDF). Mathematical Intelligencer. 7 (2). Translated by Gray, Jeremy: 18–22. doi:10.1007/BF03024169. S2CID 123548747.
- Krömer, Ralf (2006). "La "machine de Grothendieck" se fonde-t-elle seulement sur des vocables métamathématiques? Bourbaki et les catégories au cours des années cinquante". Revue d'histoire des mathématiques. 12: 119–162. doi:10.24033/rhm.38. Zbl 1177.01034.
- Mashaal, Maurice (2006). Bourbaki: a Secret Society of Mathematicians. American Mathematical Society. ISBN 978-0821839676.
- Senechal, Marjorie (1998). "The Continuing Silence of Bourbaki: an Interview with Pierre Cartier, June 18, 1997". Mathematical Intelligencer. 20: 22–28. doi:10.1007/BF03024395. S2CID 124159858.
