= Recession cone =

Set of vectors in convex analysis

In mathematics, especially convex analysis, the recession cone of a set $A$ is a cone containing all vectors such that $A$ recedes in that direction. That is, the set extends outward in all the directions given by the recession cone.

== Mathematical definition ==
Given a nonempty set $A \subset X$ for some vector space $X$, then the recession cone $\operatorname{recc}(A)$ is given by

$\operatorname{recc}(A) = \{y \in X: \forall x \in A, \forall \lambda \geq 0: x + \lambda y \in A\}.$

If $A$ is additionally a convex set then the recession cone can equivalently be defined by

$\operatorname{recc}(A) = \{y \in X: \forall x \in A: x + y \in A\}.$

If $A$ is a nonempty closed convex set then the recession cone can equivalently be defined as

$\operatorname{recc}(A) = \bigcap_{t > 0} t(A - a)$ for any choice of $a \in A.$

== Properties ==
- If $A$ is a nonempty set then $0 \in \operatorname{recc}(A)$.
- If $A$ is a nonempty convex set then $\operatorname{recc}(A)$ is a convex cone.
- If $A$ is a nonempty closed convex subset of a finite-dimensional Hausdorff space (e.g. $\mathbb{R}^d$), then $\operatorname{recc}(A) = \{0\}$ if and only if $A$ is bounded.
- If $A$ is a nonempty set then $A + \operatorname{recc}(A) = A$ where the sum denotes Minkowski addition.

== Relation to asymptotic cone ==
The asymptotic cone for $C \subseteq X$ is defined by

$C_{\infty} = \{x \in X: \exists (t_i)_{i \in I} \subset (0,\infty), \exists (x_i)_{i \in I} \subset C: t_i \to 0, t_i x_i \to x\}.$

By the definition it can easily be shown that $\operatorname{recc}(C) \subseteq C_\infty.$

In a finite-dimensional space, then it can be shown that $C_{\infty} = \operatorname{recc}(C)$ if $C$ is nonempty, closed and convex. In infinite-dimensional spaces, then the relation between asymptotic cones and recession cones is more complicated, with properties for their equivalence summarized in.

== Sum of closed sets ==
- Dieudonné's theorem: Let nonempty closed convex sets $A,B \subset X$ a locally convex space, if either $A$ or $B$ is locally compact and $\operatorname{recc}(A) \cap \operatorname{recc}(B)$ is a linear subspace, then $A - B$ is closed.
- Let nonempty closed convex sets $A,B \subset \mathbb{R}^d$ such that for any $y \in \operatorname{recc}(A) \backslash \{0\}$ then $-y \not\in \operatorname{recc}(B)$, then $A + B$ is closed.

== See also ==
- Barrier cone
