= Bourbaki dangerous bend symbol =

Typological symbol representing difficulty

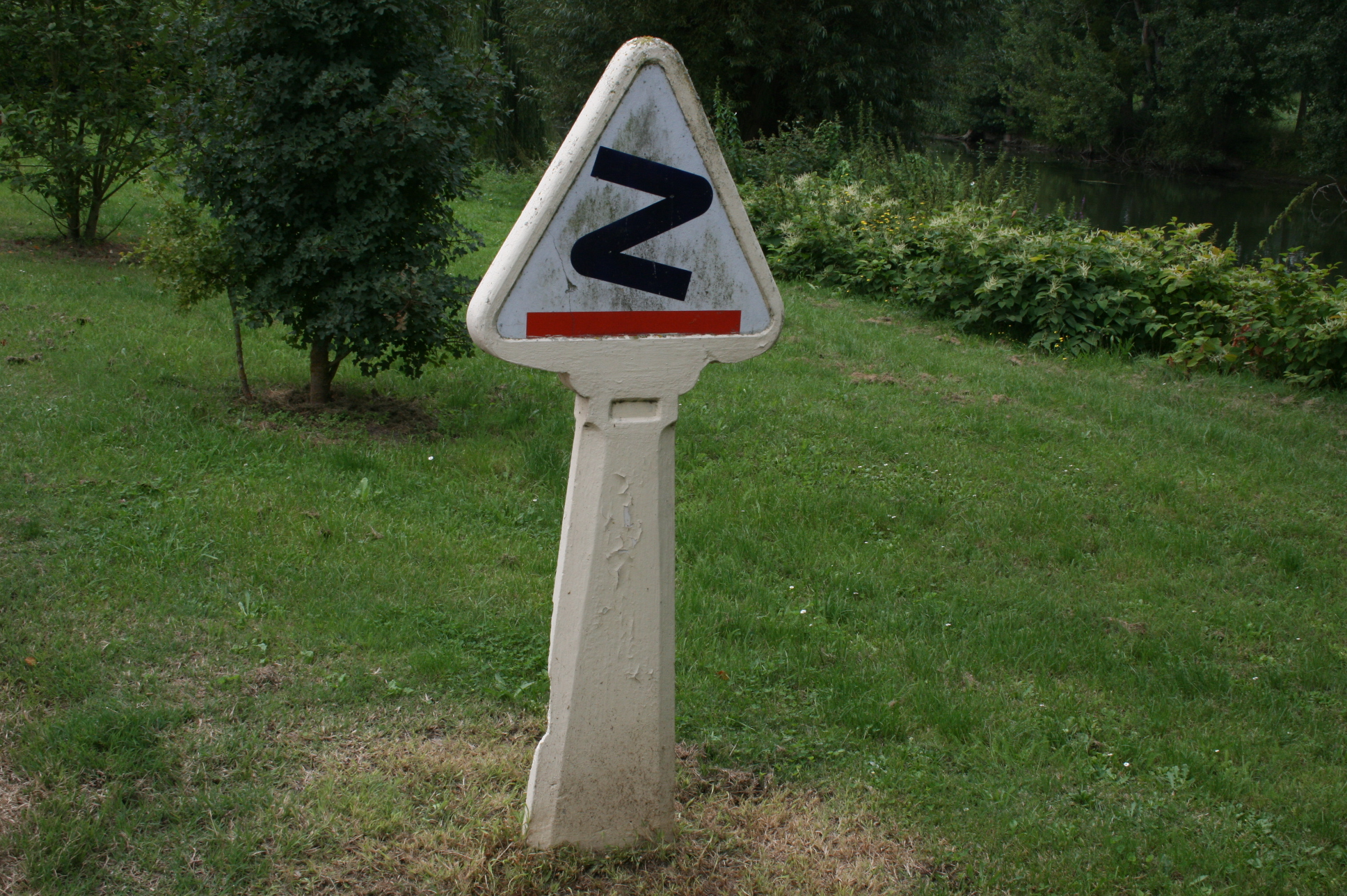
French "virages dangereux" road sign, before 1949

The dangerous bend or caution symbol ☡ (U+2621 ☡ CAUTION SIGN) was created by the Nicolas Bourbaki group of mathematicians and appears in the margins of mathematics books written by the group. It resembles a road sign that indicates a "dangerous bend" in the road ahead, and is used to mark passages tricky on a first reading or with an especially difficult argument.

Certains passages sont destinés à prémunir le lecteur contre des erreurs graves, où il risquerait de tomber; ces passages sont signalés en marge par le signe ☡ (« tournant dangereux »)

Some passages are designed to forewarn the reader against serious errors, where he risks falling; these passages are indicated in the margin with the sign ☡ ("dangerous bend")

– Nicolas Bourbaki's description of the symbol in several textbooks

== Variations ==
Others have used variations of the symbol in their books. The computer scientist Donald Knuth introduced an American-style road sign depiction in his Metafont and TeX systems, with a pair of adjacent signs indicating doubly dangerous passages.

== Typography ==
Knuth's "Dangerous Bend" sign, with yellow color added.

In the LaTeX typesetting system, Knuth's dangerous bend symbol can be produced by first loading the font manfnt (a font with extra symbols used in Knuth's TeX manual) with \usepackage{manfnt} and then typing \dbend.

There are several variations given by \lhdbend, \reversedvideodbend, \textdbend, \textlhdbend, and \textreversedvideodbend.

== See also ==
- Halmos box
