= Jean Dieudonné =

French mathematician (1906–1992)

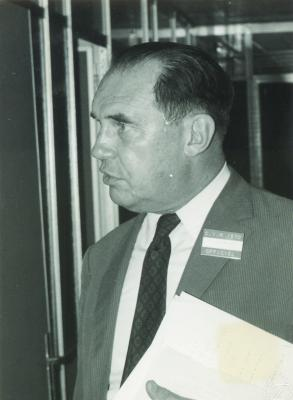
- Dieudonné in 1970
- Born: Jean Alexandre Eugène Dieudonné; 1 July 1906; Lille, France
- Died: 29 November 1992 (aged 86); Paris, France
- Education: École Normale Supérieure
- Known for: Cartan–Dieudonné theorem Dieudonné complete space Dieudonné determinant Dieudonné plank Dieudonné module Dieudonné's theorem Paracompact space
- Awards: Lester R. Ford Award (1973); Leroy P. Steele Prize (1971); Prix Francoeur (1938); Peccot Lecture (1933)
- Scientific career
- Fields: Mathematics
- Workplaces: Institut des Hautes Études Scientifiques; University of Nice; University of São Paulo; University of Nancy; University of Michigan; Northwestern University
- Doctoral advisor: Paul Montel
- Doctoral students: Alexander Grothendieck; Paulo Ribenboim

Jean Alexandre Eugène Dieudonné (French: [ʒɑ̃ alɛksɑ̃dʁ øʒɛn djødɔne]; 1 July 1906 – 29 November 1992) was a French mathematician, notable for research in abstract algebra, algebraic geometry, and functional analysis, for close involvement with the Nicolas Bourbaki pseudonymous group and the Éléments de géométrie algébrique project of Alexander Grothendieck, and as a historian of mathematics, particularly in the fields of functional analysis and algebraic topology. His work on the classical groups (the book La Géométrie des groupes classiques was published in 1955), and on formal groups, introducing what now are called Dieudonné modules, had a major effect on those fields.

He was born and brought up in Lille, with a formative stay in England where he was introduced to algebra. In 1924 he was admitted to the École Normale Supérieure, where André Weil was a classmate. He began working in complex analysis. In 1934 he was one of the group of normaliens convened by Weil, which would become 'Bourbaki'.

== Education and teaching ==
He served in the French Army during World War II, and then taught in Clermont-Ferrand until the liberation of France. After holding professorships at the University of São Paulo (1946–47), the University of Nancy (1948–1952) and the University of Michigan (1952–53), he joined the Department of Mathematics at Northwestern University in 1953, before returning to France as a founding member of the Institut des Hautes Études Scientifiques. He moved to the University of Nice to found the Department of Mathematics in 1964, and retired in 1970. He was elected as a member of the Académie des Sciences in 1968.

== Career ==
Dieudonné drafted much of the Bourbaki series of texts, the many volumes of the EGA algebraic geometry series, and nine volumes of his own Éléments d'Analyse. The first volume of the Traité is a French version of the book Foundations of Modern Analysis (1960), which had become a graduate textbook on functional analysis.

He also wrote individual monographs on Infinitesimal Calculus, Linear Algebra and Elementary Geometry, invariant theory, commutative algebra, algebraic geometry, and formal groups.

With Laurent Schwartz he supervised the early research of Alexander Grothendieck. Later from 1959 to 1964 he was at the Institut des Hautes Études Scientifiques alongside Grothendieck, and collaborating on the expository work needed to support the project of refounding algebraic geometry on the new basis of schemes.

== Selected works ==
- Sur les groupes classiques. Paris: Hermann. 1948.
- Dieudonné, Jean (1955), La géométrie des groupes classiques, Ergebnisse der Mathematik und ihrer Grenzgebiete (N.F.), Heft 5, Berlin, New York: Springer-Verlag, MR 0072144 ISBN 978-0-387-05391-2.
- 9 volumes of Éléments d'analyse (1960-1982), éd. Gauthier-Villars
  - Foundations of Modern Analysis. Academic Press. 1960.
- Algèbre linéaire et géométrie élémentaire. Hermann. 1964.; Eng. trans: Linear algebra and geometry. 1969.
- Dieudonné, Jean A. (1970). "The work of Nicolas Bourbaki". American Mathematical Monthly. 77 (2): 134–145. doi:10.2307/2317325. JSTOR 2317325. Archived from the original on 2015-07-13.
- Dieudonné, Jean A.; Carrell, James B. (1971), "Invariant theory, old and new", Advances in Mathematics, vol. 4, Boston, MA: Academic Press, pp. 1–80, doi:10.1016/0001-8708(70)90015-0, ISBN 978-0-12-215540-6, MR 0279102 (a reprint of Dieudonné, Jean A.; Carrell, James B. (1970), "Invariant theory, old and new", Advances in Mathematics, 4: 1–80, doi:10.1016/0001-8708(70)90015-0, ISSN 0001-8708, MR 0255525)
- Dieudonne, J. (Oct 1972). "Historical development of algebraic geometry" (PDF). American Mathematical Monthly. 79 (8): 827–866. doi:10.2307/2317664. JSTOR 2317664. Archived from the original (PDF) on 2016-03-03.
- Introduction to the theory of formal groups. Dekker. 1973.
- Cours de géométrie algébrique I. P.U.F. 1974.; Eng. trans: History of Algebraic Geometry. Wadsworth Inc. 1985. ISBN 9780534037239.
- Cours de géométrie algébrique II. P.U.F. 1974.
- Dieudonné, Jean Alexandre (1982), A panorama of pure mathematics, Pure and Applied Mathematics, vol. 97, London: Academic Press Inc. [Harcourt Brace Jovanovich Publishers], ISBN 978-0-12-215560-4, MR 0478177
- Dieudonné, Jean (1981), Choix d'œuvres mathématiques. Tome I (in French), Paris: Hermann, ISBN 978-2-7056-5922-6, MR 0611149
- Dieudonné, Jean (1981), Choix d'œuvres mathématiques. Tome II (in French), Paris: Hermann, ISBN 978-2-7056-5923-3, MR 0611150
- History of functional analysis. North-Holland. 1981. ISBN 9780080871608.
- Pour l'honneur de l'esprit humain: les mathématiques aujourd'hui. Hachette. 1987.
- A History of Algebraic and Differential Topology 1900-1960. Birkhäuser Boston. 1988. ISBN 9780817649074.
- Mathematics - the music of reason. Springer. 1992. ISBN 9783540533467.
