= René de Possel =

French mathematician

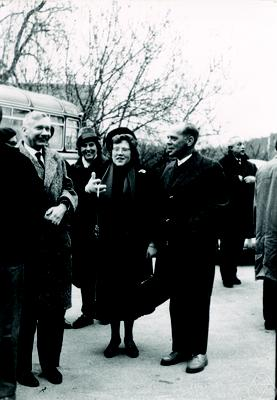
- From left to right: Hans Hornich, Hans Wittich, René De Possel. Oberwolfach, 1961.
- Born: Lucien Alexandre Charles René de Possel; February 7, 1905; Marseille, France
- Died: 1974 (aged 68–69); Paris, France
- Occupations: Mathematician, computer scientist
- Known for: Founder of Nicolas Bourbaki

Lucien Alexandre Charles René de Possel (7 February 1905 – 1974) was a French mathematician, one of the founders of the Bourbaki group, and later a pioneer computer scientist, working in particular on optical character recognition.

== Life ==
Possel was born in Marseille. He had the conventional background for a member of Bourbaki: the École Normale Supérieure, agrégation, and then study in Germany. He left Bourbaki at an early stage: there was an obvious personal matter intruding between him and André Weil who had married De Possel's ex-wife Eveline following her divorce from De Possel in 1937.

== Work ==
De Possel published an early book on game theory in 1936 (Sur la théorie mathématique des jeux de hasard et de réflexion). His later research work in computer science at the Institut Blaise Pascal was in a position of relative isolation, as the subject strove for independence and to move away from the imposed role of service provider in the field of numerical analysis. He became director there in 1960, in succession to Louis Couffignal (1902–1966), until an administrative reorganisation under the C. N. R. S. in 1969. He was a leading figure in pushing for the later Institut de Programmation. He died in Paris.
