= Jean Coulomb =

French geophysicist (1904-1999)

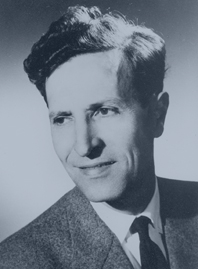

2nd President of the French Space Agency
- In office 1962–1967
- Preceded by: Pierre Auger
- Succeeded by: Jean-François Denisse

Personal details
- Born: 7 November 1904 Blida, Algeria
- Died: 26 February 1999 (aged 94) Paris, France
- Occupation: Geophysicist, mathematician
- Known for: Early member of Nicolas Bourbaki

Academic background
- Education: École normale supérieure University of Paris
- Doctoral advisor: Marcel Brillouin; Henri Villat

Jean Marie François Joseph Coulomb (7 November 1904 – 26 February 1999) was a French geophysicist and mathematician, and one of the early members of the Bourbaki group of mathematicians.

== Biography ==
Coulomb was born in Blida, Algeria. From April 1935 to 1937, he was a member of the Bourbaki group of mathematicians.

He was a professor in the Faculty of Sciences of Paris from 1941 to 1972, and director of the Institut de Physique du Globe de Paris from 1941 to 1959.

He was director general of CNRS, the French National Centre for Scientific Research from 1957 to 1962, president of CNES from 1962 to 1967, and president of the Bureau des Longitudes from 1967 to 1969.

Coulomb was the President of the Société astronomique de France (SAF), the French astronomical society, from 1958 to 1960.

From 1967 to 1971, he was also president of the International Union of Geodesy and Geophysics (IUGG), and from 1972 to 1974 of the International Council for Science (ICSU).

In 1960, he was elected to the French Academy of Sciences, and was its president from 1976 to 1977.

His work was in the fields of seismology (theory of surface waves), geomagnetism, and meteorology (atmospheric electricity and the physics of clouds).

== Awards and distinctions ==
- 1956 — Prix Charles Lagrange
- 1961 — Prix Jules Janssen
- 1971 — Prix des Trois Physiciens
- 1991 — Grand Cross of the Légion d'Honneur
- Grand Croix of the Ordre du Mérite
- Officer of the Ordre du Mérite Saharien

== Bibliography ==
- Coulomb, Jean; Loisel, Julien (1940). La physique des nuages (in French). FeniXX. ISBN 978-2-7050-0554-2.
- Coulomb, Jean (1956), Bartels, J. (ed.), "Séismométrie", Geophysik I / Geophysics I, Handbuch der Physik / Encyclopedia of Physics, vol. 10 / 47, Berlin, Heidelberg: Springer Berlin Heidelberg, pp. 24–74, Bibcode:1956HDP....47...24C, doi:10.1007/978-3-642-45855-2_2 ISBN 978-3-642-45857-6.
- Coulomb, Jean; Jobert, Georges (1963). The Physical Constitution of the Earth. Hafner Publishing Company.
- Coulomb, Jean (1972). Sea Floor Spreading and Continental Drift. Springer Science & Business Media. ISBN 978-94-010-2899-8.
- Coulomb, Jean; Jobert, Georges (1973). Traité de géophysique interne. 1. Sismologie et pesanteur (in French). Masson. ISBN 978-2-225-36300-9.
- Coulomb, Jean (1976). Traité de géophysique interne. 2. Magnétisme et géodynamique (in French). Masson. ISBN 978-2-225-42790-9.
