= Dieudonné's theorem =

In mathematics, Dieudonné's theorem, named after Jean Dieudonné, is a theorem on when the Minkowski sum of closed sets is closed.

== Statement ==
Let $X$ be a locally convex space and $A,B \subset X$ nonempty closed convex sets. If either $A$ or $B$ is locally compact and $\operatorname{recc}(A) \cap \operatorname{recc}(B)$ (where $\operatorname{recc}$ gives the recession cone) is a linear subspace, then $A - B$ is closed.
