= James B. Carrell =

American and Canadian mathematician

James Carrell
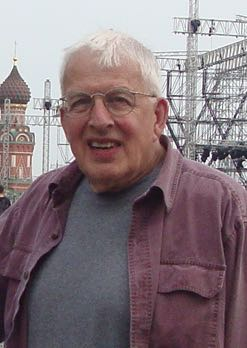
- Born: Seattle, Washington, United States
- Education: University of Washington
- Known for: Carrell–Liebmermann theorem, singularities of Schubert varieties
- Scientific career
- Fields: Mathematics
- Workplaces: University of British Columbia

James B. Carrell (born 1940) is an American and Canadian mathematician, who is currently an emeritus professor of mathematics at the University of British Columbia, Vancouver, British Columbia, Canada. His areas of research are algebraic geometry, Lie theory, transformation groups and differential geometry.

He obtained his Ph.D. at the University of Washington (Seattle) under the supervision of Allendoefer. In 1971, together with Jean Dieudonné, he received the Leroy P. Steele Prize for the article Invariant theory, old and new.

He proved theorems in Schubert calculus about singularities of Schubert varieties. The Carrell–Liebermann theorem on the zero set of a holomorphic vector field is used in complex algebraic geometry.

He is a fellow of the American Mathematical Society.
