= Treatise on Analysis =

- Author: Jean Dieudonné
- Original title: Élements d'analyse
- Language: French
- Subject: Mathematical analysis

Treatise on Analysis is a translation by Ian G. Macdonald of the nine-volume work Éléments d'analyse on mathematical analysis by Jean Dieudonné, and is an expansion of his textbook Foundations of Modern Analysis. It is a successor to the various Cours d'Analyse by Augustin-Louis Cauchy, Camille Jordan, and Édouard Goursat.

== Contents and publication history ==
=== Volume I ===
The first volume was originally a stand-alone graduate textbook with a different title. It was first written in English and later translated into French, unlike the other volumes which were first written in French. It has been republished several times and is much more common than the later volumes of the series.

The contents include

- Chapter I: Sets
- Chapter II Real numbers
- Chapter III Metric spaces
- Chapter IV The real line
- Chapter V Normed spaces
- Chapter VI Hilbert spaces
- Chapter VII Spaces of continuous functions
- Chapter VIII Differential calculus (This uses the Cauchy integral rather than the more common Riemann integral of functions.)
- Chapter IX Analytic functions (of a complex variable)
- Chapter X Existence theorems (for ordinary differential equations)
- Chapter XI Elementary spectral theory
- Dieudonné, J. (1960), Foundations of modern analysis, Pure and Applied Mathematics, vol. X, New York-London: Academic Press, MR 0120319
- Dieudonné, J. (1963), Éléments d'analyse. Tome I: Fondements de l'analyse moderne, Cahiers Scientifiques, vol. XXVIII, Paris: Gauthier-Villars, MR 0161945
- Dieudonné, J. (1968), Éléments d'analyse. Tome I: Fondements de l'analyse moderne, Cahiers Scientifiques, vol. XXVIII (2nd ed.), Paris: Gauthier-Villars, MR 0235945
- Dieudonné, J. (1969), Foundations of modern analysis., Pure and Applied Mathematics, vol. 10-I (2nd ed.), New York-London: Academic Press, ISBN 978-0122155505, MR 0349288

=== Volume II ===
The second volume includes

- Chapter XII Topology and topological algebra
- Chapter XIII Integration
- Chapter XIV Integration in locally compact groups
- Chapter XV Normed algebras and spectral theory
- Dieudonné, J. (1968), Éléments d'analyse. Tome II: Chapitres XII à XV, Cahiers Scientifiques, vol. XXXI, Paris: Gauthier-Villars, MR 0235946
- Dieudonné, J. (1970), Treatise on analysis. Vol. II, Pure and Applied Mathematics, vol. 10-II, New York-London: Academic Press, MR 0258551
- Dieudonné, J. (1976), Treatise on analysis. Vol. II, Pure and Applied Mathematics, vol. 10-II (2nd ed.), New York-London: Academic Press, ISBN 0-12-215502-5, MR 0530406

=== Volume III ===
The third volume includes chapter XVI on differential manifolds and chapter XVII on distributions and differential operators.

=== Volume IV ===
The fourth volume includes

- Chapter XVIII Differential systems
- Chapter XIX Lie groups
- Chapter XX Riemannian geometry

=== Volume V ===
Volume V consists of chapter XXI on compact Lie groups.

=== Volume VI ===
Volume VI consists of chapter XXII on harmonic analysis (mostly on locally compact groups)

=== Volume VII ===
Volume VII consists of the first part of chapter XXIII on linear functional equations. This chapter is considerably more advanced than most of the other chapters.

=== Volume VIII ===
Volume VIII consists of the second part of chapter XXIII on linear functional equations.

=== Volume IX ===
Volume IX contains chapter XXIV on elementary differential topology. Unlike the earlier volumes there is no English translation of it.

- Dieudonné, J. (1982), Éléments d'analyse. Tome IX. Chapitre XXIV, Cahiers Scientifiques, vol. XL11, Paris: Gauthier-Villars, ISBN 2-04-011499-8, MR 0658305

=== Volume X ===
Dieudonne planned a final volume containing chapter XXV on nonlinear problems, but this was never published.
