= Novikov's compact leaf theorem =

Result about foliation of compact 3-manifolds

In mathematics, Novikov's compact leaf theorem, named after Sergei Novikov, states that

A codimension-one foliation of a compact 3-manifold whose universal covering space is not contractible must have a compact leaf.

== Novikov's compact leaf theorem for S^{3} ==
Theorem: A smooth codimension-one foliation of the 3-sphere S^{3} has a compact leaf. The leaf is a torus T^{2} bounding a solid torus with the Reeb foliation.

The theorem was proved by Sergei Novikov in 1964. Earlier, Charles Ehresmann had conjectured that every smooth codimension-one foliation on S^{3} had a compact leaf, which was known to be true for all known examples; in particular, the Reeb foliation has a compact leaf that is T^{2}.

== Novikov's compact leaf theorem for any M^{3} ==
In 1965, Novikov proved the compact leaf theorem for any M^{3}:

Theorem: Let M^{3} be a closed 3-manifold with a smooth codimension-one foliation F. Suppose any of the following conditions is satisfied:

1. the fundamental group $\pi_1(M^3)$ is finite,
2. the second homotopy group $\pi_2(M^3)\ne 0$,
3. there exists a leaf $L\in F$ such that the map $\pi_1(L)\to\pi_1(M^3)$ induced by inclusion has a non-trivial kernel.

Then F has a compact leaf of genus g ≤ 1.

In terms of covering spaces:

A codimension-one foliation of a compact 3-manifold whose universal covering space is not contractible must have a compact leaf.
