= Affine manifold =

In differential geometry, an affine manifold is a differentiable manifold equipped with a flat, torsion-free connection.

Equivalently, it is a manifold that is (if connected) covered by an open subset of ${\mathbb R}^n$, with monodromy acting by affine transformations. This equivalence is an easy corollary of Cartan–Ambrose–Hicks theorem.

Equivalently, it is a manifold equipped with an atlas—called the affine structure—such that all transition functions between charts are affine transformations (that is, have constant Jacobian matrix); two atlases are equivalent if the manifold admits an atlas subjugated to both, with transitions from both atlases to a smaller atlas being affine. A manifold having a distinguished affine structure is called an affine manifold and the charts which are affinely related to those of the affine structure are called affine charts. In each affine coordinate domain the coordinate vector fields form a parallelisation of that domain, so there is an associated connection on each domain. These locally defined connections are the same on overlapping parts, so there is a unique connection associated with an affine structure. Note there is a link between linear connection (also called affine connection) and a web.

== Formal definition ==
An affine manifold $M\,$ is a real manifold with charts $\psi_i\colon U_i\to{\mathbb R}^n$ such that $\psi_i\circ\psi_j^{-1}\in \operatorname{Aff}({\mathbb R}^n)$ for all $i, j\, ,$ where $\operatorname{Aff}({\mathbb R}^n)$ denotes the group of affine transformations. In fancier words it is a (G,X)-manifold where $X=\mathbb R^n$ and $G$ is the group of affine transformations.

An affine manifold is called complete if its universal covering is homeomorphic to ${\mathbb R}^n$.

In the case of a compact affine manifold $M$, let $G$ be the fundamental group of $M$ and $\widetilde M$ be its universal cover. One can show that each $n$-dimensional affine manifold comes with a developing map $D\colon {\widetilde M}\to{\mathbb R}^n$, and a homomorphism $\varphi\colon G\to \operatorname{Aff}({\mathbb R}^n)$, such that $D$ is an immersion and equivariant with respect to $\varphi$.

A fundamental group of a compact complete flat affine manifold is called an affine crystallographic group. Classification of affine crystallographic groups is a difficult problem, far from being solved. The Riemannian crystallographic groups (also known as Bieberbach groups) were classified by Ludwig Bieberbach, answering a question posed by David Hilbert. In his work on Hilbert's 18-th problem, Bieberbach proved that any Riemannian crystallographic group contains an abelian subgroup of finite index.

=== Complex affine manifolds ===
An affine complex manifold is a complex manifold that has an atlas whose transition maps belong to the group of complex affine transformations, that is, have the form $z \mapsto A \cdot z + c$ where $n$ is the (complex) dimension of the manifold, $c\in \mathbb C^n,$ and $A$ is an invertible $n \times n$ matrix with complex entries. In other words, it is a $(G, X)$-manifold where $X=\C^n$ and $G$ is the group of complex affine transformations of $\C^n.$

== Important longstanding conjectures ==
Geometry of affine manifolds is essentially a network of longstanding conjectures; most of them proven in low dimension and some other special cases.

The most important of them are:

- Markus conjecture (1962) stating that a compact affine manifold is complete if and only if it has parallel volume. Known in dimension 2.
- Auslander conjecture (1964) stating that any affine crystallographic group contains a polycyclic subgroup of finite index. Known in dimensions up to 6, and when the holonomy of the flat connection preserves a Lorentz metric. Since every virtually polycyclic crystallographic group preserves a volume form, Auslander conjecture implies the "only if" part of the Markus conjecture.
- Chern conjecture (1955) The Euler class of an affine manifold vanishes.
