= Taut foliation =

Concept in mathematics

In mathematics, tautness is a rigidity property of foliations. A taut foliation is a codimension 1 foliation of a closed manifold with the property that every leaf meets a transverse circle. By transverse circle, is meant a closed loop that is always transverse to the leaves of the foliation.

If the foliated manifold has non-empty tangential boundary, then a codimension 1 foliation is taut if every leaf meets a transverse circle or a transverse arc with endpoints on the tangential boundary. Equivalently, by a result of Dennis Sullivan, a codimension 1 foliation is taut if there exists a Riemannian metric that makes each leaf a minimal surface. Furthermore, for compact manifolds the existence, for every leaf $L$, of a transverse circle meeting $L$, implies the existence of a single transverse circle meeting every leaf.

Taut foliations were brought to prominence by the work of William Thurston and David Gabai.

== Relation to Reebless foliations ==
Taut foliations are closely related to the concept of Reebless foliation. A taut foliation cannot have a Reeb component, since the component would act like a "dead-end" from which a transverse curve could never escape; consequently, the boundary torus of the Reeb component has no transverse circle puncturing it. A Reebless foliation can fail to be taut but the only leaves of the foliation with no puncturing transverse circle must be compact, and in particular, homeomorphic to a torus.

== Properties ==
The existence of a taut foliation implies various useful properties about a closed 3-manifold. For example, a closed, orientable 3-manifold, which admits a taut foliation with no sphere leaf, must be irreducible, covered by $\mathbb R^3$, and have negatively curved fundamental group.

== Rummler–Sullivan theorem ==
By a theorem of Hansklaus Rummler and Dennis Sullivan, the following conditions are equivalent for transversely orientable codimension one foliations $\left(M,{\mathcal{F}}\right)$ of closed, orientable, smooth manifolds M:

- $\mathcal{F}$ is taut;
- there is a flow transverse to $\mathcal{F}$ which preserves some volume form on M;
- there is a Riemannian metric on M for which the leaves of $\mathcal{F}$ are least area surfaces.
