= Web (differential geometry) =

In mathematics, a web permits an intrinsic characterization in terms of Riemannian geometry of the additive separation of variables in the Hamilton–Jacobi equation.

== Formal definition ==
An orthogonal web (also called an orthogonal grid or Ricci grid) on a Riemannian manifold (M,g) of dimension n is a set $\mathcal S = (\mathcal S^1,\dots,\mathcal S^n)$ of n pairwise transversal and orthogonal foliations of connected submanifolds of codimension 1. Note that two submanifolds of codimension 1 are orthogonal iff their normal vectors are orthogonal, and that in the case of a nondefinite metric, orthogonality does not imply transversality.

=== Remark ===
Since vector fields can be visualized as stream-lines of a stationary flow or as Faraday’s lines of force, a non-vanishing vector field in space generates a space-filling system of lines through each point, known to mathematicians as a congruence (i.e., a local foliation). Ricci’s idea was to fill an n-dimensional Riemannian manifold with n congruences orthogonal to each other, i.e., a local orthogonal grid.

== Differential geometry of webs ==
A systematic study of webs was started by Blaschke in the 1930s. He extended the same group-theoretic approach to web geometry.

=== Classical definition ===
Let $M=X^{nr}$ be a differentiable manifold of dimension N=nr. A d-web W(d,n,r) codimension r in an open set $D\subset X^{nr}$ is a set of d foliations of codimension r which are in general position.

In the notation W(d,n,r) the number d is the number of foliations forming a web, r is the web codimension, and n is the ratio of the dimension nr of the manifold M and the web codimension. Of course, one may define a d-web of codimension r without having r as a divisor of the dimension of the ambient manifold.

== See also ==
- Foliation
- Parallelization (mathematics)
