= (G, X)-manifold =

In geometry, if X is a manifold with an action of a topological group G by analytical diffeomorphisms, the notion of a (G, X)-structure on a topological space is a way to formalise it being locally isomorphic to X with its G-invariant structure; spaces with a (G, X)-structure are always manifolds and are called (G, X)-manifolds. This notion is often used with G being a Lie group and X a homogeneous space for G. Foundational examples are hyperbolic manifolds and affine manifolds.

== Definition and examples ==
=== Formal definition ===
Let $X$ be a connected differentiable manifold and $G$ be a subgroup of the group of diffeomorphisms of $X$ which act analytically in the following sense:

if $g_1, g_2 \in G$ and there is a nonempty open subset $U \subset X$ such that $g_1, g_2$ are equal when restricted to $U$ then $g_1 = g_2$

(this definition is inspired by the analytic continuation property of analytic diffeomorphisms on an analytic manifold).

A $(G, X)$-structure on a topological space $M$ is a manifold structure on $M$ whose atlas's charts have values in $X$ and transition maps belong to $G$. This means that there exists:

- a covering of $M$ by open sets $U_i, i \in I$ (i.e. $M = \bigcup_{i \in I} U_i$);
- open embeddings $\varphi_i : U_i \to X$ called charts;

such that every transition map $\varphi_i \circ \varphi_j^{-1} : \varphi_j(U_i\cap U_j) \to \varphi_i(U_i \cap U_j)$ is the restriction of a diffeomorphism in $G$.

Two such structures $(U_i, \varphi_i), (V_j, \psi_j)$ are equivalent when they are contained in a maximal one, equivalently when their union is also a $(G, X)$ structure (i.e. the maps $\varphi_i \circ \psi_j^{-1}$ and $\psi_j \circ \varphi_i^{-1}$ are restrictions of diffeomorphisms in $G$).

=== Riemannian examples ===
If $G$ is a Lie group and $X$ a Riemannian manifold with a faithful action of $G$ by isometries then the action is analytic. Usually one takes $G$ to be the full isometry group of $X$. Then the category of $(G, X)$ manifolds is equivalent to the category of Riemannian manifolds which are locally isometric to $X$ (i.e. every point has a neighbourhood isometric to an open subset of $X$).

Often the examples of $X$ are homogeneous under $G$, for example one can take $X = G$ with a left-invariant metric. A particularly simple example is $X = \R^n$ and $G$ the group of euclidean isometries. Then a $(G,X)$ manifold is simply a flat manifold.

A particularly interesting example is when $X$ is a Riemannian symmetric space, for example hyperbolic space. The simplest such example is the hyperbolic plane, whose isometry group is isomorphic to $G = \mathrm{PGL}_2(\R)$.

=== Pseudo-Riemannian examples ===
When $X$ is Minkowski space and $G$ the Lorentz group the notion of a $(G, X)$-structure is the same as that of a flat Lorentzian manifold.

=== Other examples ===
When $X$ is the affine space and $G$ the group of affine transformations then one gets the notion of an affine manifold.

When $X = \mathbb P^n(\R)$ is the n-dimensional real projective space and $G = \mathrm{PGL}_{n+1}(\R)$ one gets the notion of a projective structure.

== Developing map and completeness ==
=== Developing map ===
Let $M$ be a $(G,X)$-manifold which is connected (as a topological space). The developing map is a map from the universal cover $\tilde M$ to $X$ which is only well-defined up to composition by an element of $G$.

A developing map is defined as follows: fix $p\in \tilde M$ and let $q \in \tilde M$ be any other point, $\gamma$ a path from $p$ to $q$, and $\varphi: U \to X$ (where $U$ is a small enough neighbourhood of $p$) a map obtained by composing a chart of $M$ with the projection $\tilde M \to M$. We may use analytic continuation along $\gamma$ to extend $\varphi$ so that its domain includes $q$. Since $\tilde M$ is simply connected the value of $\varphi(q)$ thus obtained does not depend on the original choice of $\gamma$, and we call the (well-defined) map $\varphi: \tilde M \to X$ a developing map for the $(G,X)$-structure. It depends on the choice of base point and chart, but only up to composition by an element of $G$.

=== Monodromy ===
Given a developing map $\varphi$, the monodromy or holonomy of a $(G,X)$-structure is the unique morphism $h : \pi_1(M) \to G$ which satisfies

$$\forall \gamma \in \pi_1(M), p\in \tilde M : \varphi(\gamma\cdot p) = h(\gamma)\cdot \varphi(p)$$.

It depends on the choice of a developing map but only up to an inner automorphism of $G$.

=== Complete (G,X)-structures ===
A $(G,X)$ structure is said to be complete if it has a developing map which is also a covering map (this does not depend on the choice of developing map since they differ by a diffeomorphism). For example, if $X$ is simply connected the structure is complete if and only if the developing map is a diffeomorphism.

=== Examples ===
==== Riemannian (G,X)-structures ====
If $X$ is a Riemannian manifold and $G$ its full group of isometry, then a $(G,X)$-structure is complete if and only if the underlying Riemannian manifold is geodesically complete (equivalently metrically complete). In particular, in this case if the underlying space of a $(G,X)$-manifold is compact then the latter is automatically complete.

In the case where $X$ is the hyperbolic plane the developing map is the same map as given by the Uniformisation Theorem.

==== Other cases ====
In general compactness of the space does not imply completeness of a $(G,X)$-structure. For example, an affine structure on the torus is complete if and only if the monodromy map has its image inside the translations. But there are many affine tori which do not satisfy this condition, for example any quadrilateral with its opposite sides glued by an affine map yields an affine structure on the torus, which is complete if and only if the quadrilateral is a parallelogram.

Interesting examples of complete, noncompact affine manifolds are given by the Margulis spacetimes.

== (G,X)-structures as connections ==
In the work of Charles Ehresmann $(G, X)$-structures on a manifold $M$ are viewed as flat Ehresmann connections on fiber bundles with fiber $X$ over $M$, whose monodromy maps lie in $G$.
