= Solid torus =

3-dimensional object

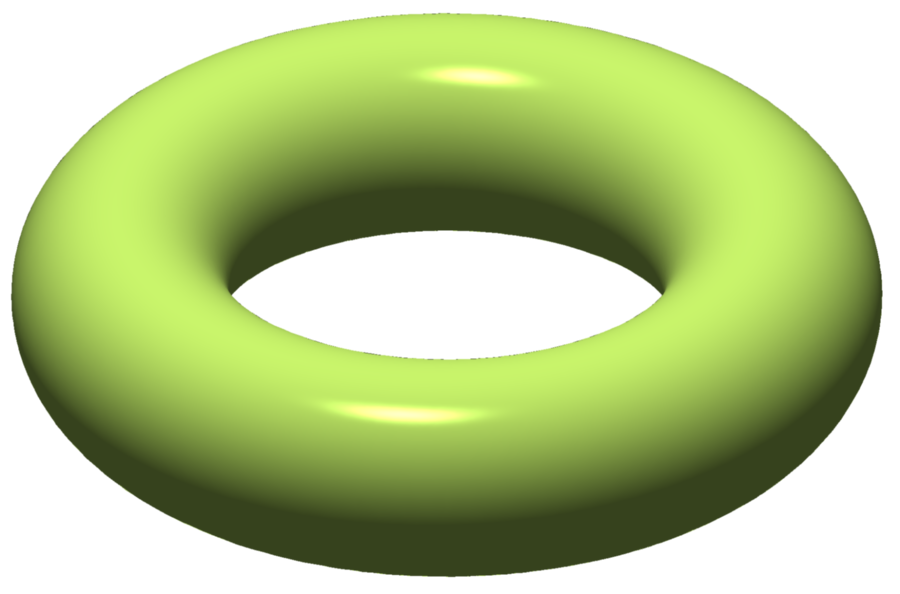
Solid torus

In mathematics, a solid torus is the solid formed by sweeping a disk around a circle. As a topological space, it is homeomorphic to the Cartesian product $S^1 \times D^2$ of the disk and the circle, endowed with the product topology.

A standard way to visualize a solid torus is as a toroid, embedded in 3-space. However, it should be distinguished from a torus, a surface which has the same visual appearance: the torus is the two-dimensional space on the boundary of a toroid, while the solid torus includes also the compact interior space enclosed by the torus. A solid torus is a torus plus the region inside the torus, with a non-zero volume. Real-world objects that approximate a solid torus include O-rings, non-inflatable lifebuoys, ring doughnuts, and bagels.

== Topological properties ==
The solid torus is a connected, compact, orientable 3-dimensional manifold with boundary. The boundary is homeomorphic to $S^1 \times S^1$, the ordinary torus.

Since the disk $D^2$ is contractible, the solid torus has the homotopy type of a circle, $S^1$. Therefore the fundamental group and homology groups are isomorphic to those of the circle:
$$\begin{align}
\pi_1\left(S^1 \times D^2\right) &\cong \pi_1\left(S^1\right) \cong \mathbb{Z}, \\
H_k\left(S^1 \times D^2\right) &\cong H_k\left(S^1\right) \cong \begin{cases}
\mathbb{Z} & \text{if } k = 0, 1, \\
0          & \text{otherwise}.
\end{cases}
\end{align}$$

== See also ==
- Cheerios
- Hyperbolic Dehn surgery
- Reeb foliation
- Whitehead manifold
- Doughnut
