= Parallelization (mathematics) =

In mathematics, a parallelization of a manifold $M\,$ of dimension n is a set of n global smooth linearly independent vector fields.

== Formal definition ==
Given a manifold $M\,$ of dimension n, a parallelization of $M\,$ is a set $\{X_1, \dots,X_n\}$ of n smooth vector fields defined on all of $M\,$ such that for every $p\in M\,$ the set $\{X_1(p), \dots,X_n(p)\}$ is a basis of $T_pM\,$, where $T_pM\,$ denotes the fiber over $p\,$ of the tangent vector bundle $TM\,$.

A manifold is called parallelizable whenever it admits a parallelization.

== Examples ==
- Every Lie group is a parallelizable manifold.
- The product of parallelizable manifolds is parallelizable.
- Every affine space, considered as manifold, is parallelizable.

== Properties ==
Proposition. A manifold $M\,$ is parallelizable iff there is a diffeomorphism $\phi \colon TM \longrightarrow M\times {\mathbb R^n}\,$ such that the first projection of $\phi\,$ is $\tau_{M}\colon TM \longrightarrow M\,$ and for each $p\in M\,$ the second factor—restricted to $T_pM\,$—is a linear map $\phi_{p} \colon T_pM \rightarrow {\mathbb R^n}\,$.

In other words, $M\,$ is parallelizable if and only if $\tau_{M}\colon TM \longrightarrow M\,$ is a trivial bundle. For example, suppose that $M\,$ is an open subset of ${\mathbb R^n}\,$, i.e., an open submanifold of ${\mathbb R^n}\,$. Then $TM\,$ is equal to $M\times {\mathbb R^n}\,$, and $M\,$ is clearly parallelizable.

== See also ==
- Chart (topology)
- Differentiable manifold
- Frame bundle
- Orthonormal frame bundle
- Principal bundle
- Connection (mathematics)
- G-structure
- Web (differential geometry)
