= Reeb foliation =

In mathematics, the Reeb foliation is a particular foliation of the 3-sphere, introduced by the French mathematician Georges Reeb (1920–1993).

It is based on dividing the sphere into two solid tori, along a 2-torus: see Clifford torus. Each of the solid tori is then foliated internally, in codimension 1, and the dividing torus surface forms one more leaf.

By Novikov's compact leaf theorem, every smooth foliation of the 3-sphere includes a compact torus leaf, bounding a solid torus foliated in the same way.

== Illustrations ==
2-dimensional section of Reeb foliation

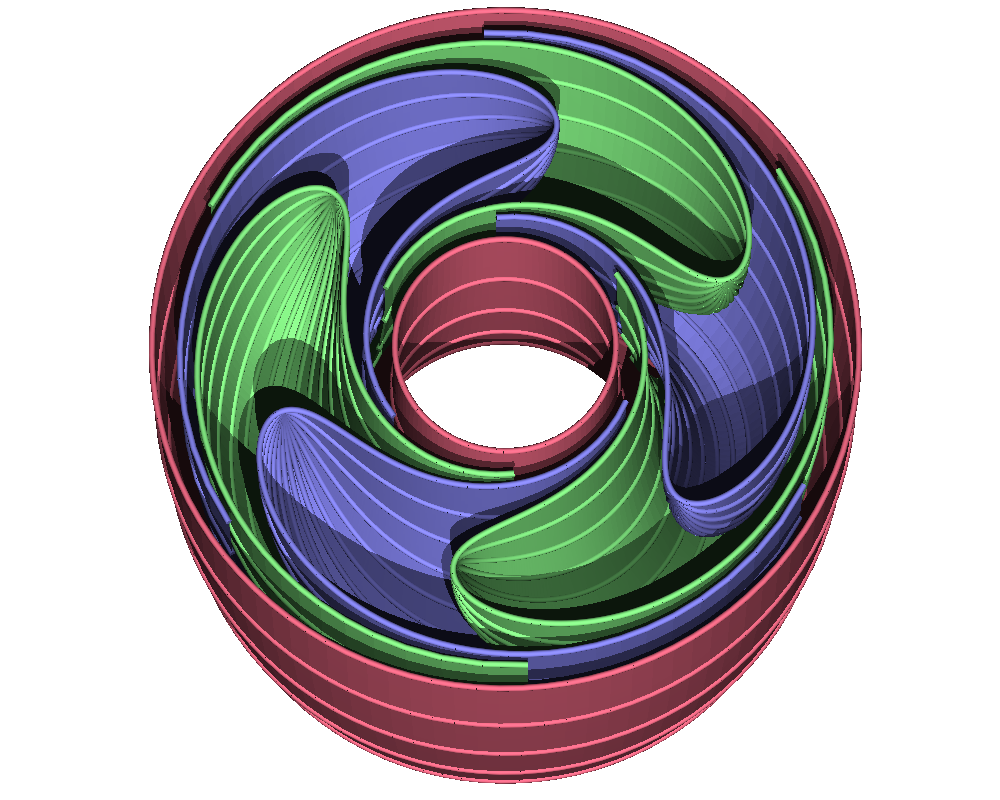
3-dimensional model of Reeb foliation
