= Foliation =

In mathematics, a partition of a manifold into submanifolds

2-dimensional section of the Reeb foliation

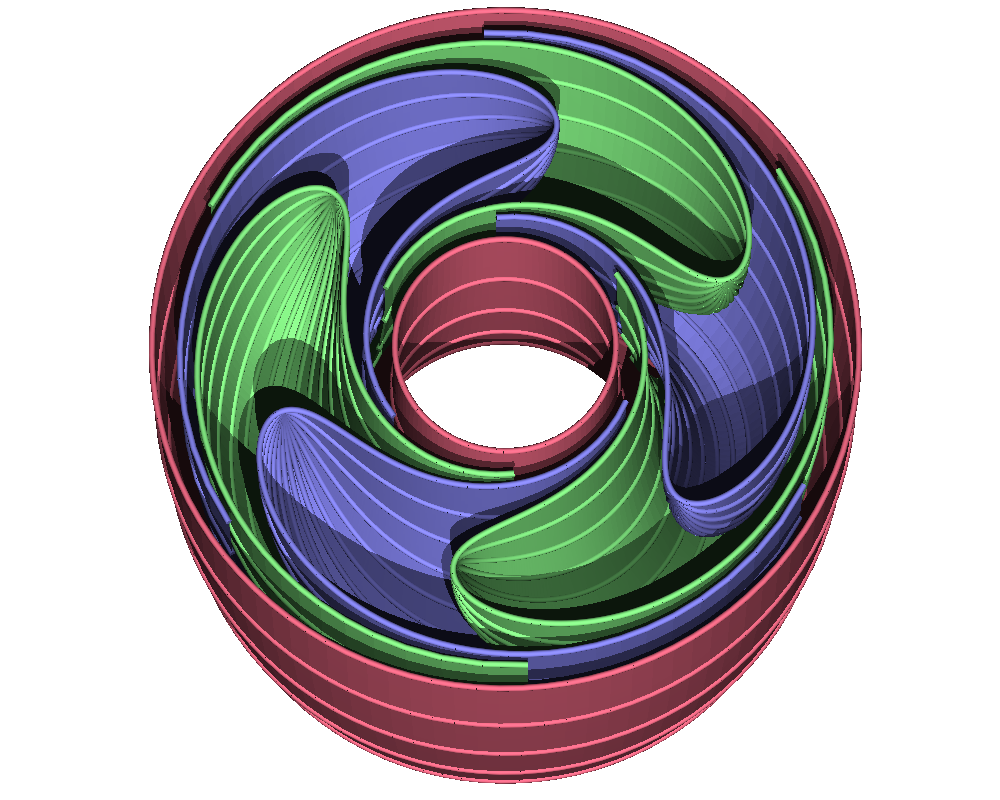
3-dimensional model of the Reeb foliation

In mathematics, a p-dimensional foliation is a partition of a manifold into submanifolds, all of the same dimension p, locally modeled on the decomposition of R^{n} into the p-dimensional planes cut out by the equations $x_{p+1} = a_{p+1}, \ldots, x_n = a_n$. The submanifolds are called the leaves of the foliation.

The 3-sphere has a famous codimension-1 foliation called the Reeb foliation.

The submanifolds are required to be connected and injectively immersed, but they are not required to be embedded. For example, if m is a fixed irrational number, the torus $\mathbb R^2 / \mathbb Z^2$ is foliated by the set of straight lines in the torus of slope m. Each line is dense in the torus and is injectively immersed but not embedded.

If the manifold and the submanifolds are required to have a piecewise-linear, differentiable (of class C^{r}), or analytic structure then one defines piecewise-linear, differentiable, or analytic foliations, respectively.

The level sets of a smooth real-valued function on a manifold with no critical points form a codimension 1 foliation on the manifold. For example, in general relativity, spacetimes with some number of spatial dimensions and 1 time dimension are often foliated as the level sets of a smooth function whose gradient is timelike, so that the leaves are spacelike hypersurfaces. Every codimension 1 foliation locally arises this way, but generally does not arise this way globally. For example, a codimension-1 foliation of a closed manifold cannot be given by the level sets of a smooth function, since a smooth function on a closed manifold necessarily has critical points at its maxima and minima.

== Foliated charts and atlases ==
In order to give a more precise definition of foliation, it is necessary to define some auxiliary elements.

A 3-dimensional foliated chart with n = 3 and q = 1. The plaques are 2-dimensional and the transversals are 1-dimensional.

A rectangular neighborhood in R^{n} is an open subset of the form B = J_{1} × ⋅⋅⋅ × J_{n}, where J_{i} is a (possibly unbounded) relatively open interval in the ith coordinate axis. If J_{1} is of the form (a,0], it is said that B has boundary

$$\partial B = \left \{ \left(0,x^2, \ldots, x^n \right ) \in B \right \}.$$

In the following definition, coordinate charts are considered that have values in R^{p} × R^{q}, allowing the possibility of manifolds with boundary and (convex) corners.

A foliated chart on the n-manifold M of codimension q is a pair (U,φ), where U ⊆ M is open and $\varphi: U \to B_{\tau} \times B_{\pitchfork}$ is a diffeomorphism, $B_{\pitchfork}$ being a rectangular neighborhood in R^{q} and $B_{\tau}$ a rectangular neighborhood in R^{p}. The set P_{y} = φ^{−1}(B_{τ} × {y}), where $y \in B_{\pitchfork}$, is called a plaque of this foliated chart. For each x ∈ B_{τ}, the set S_{x} = φ^{−1}({x} × $B_{\pitchfork}$) is called a transversal of the foliated chart. The set ∂_{τ}U = φ^{−1}(B_{τ} × (∂$B_{\pitchfork}$)) is called the tangential boundary of U and $\partial_{\pitchfork}U$ = φ^{−1}((∂B_{τ}) × $B_{\pitchfork}$) is called the transverse boundary of U.

The foliated chart is the basic model for all foliations, the plaques being the leaves. The notation B_{τ} is read as "B-tangential" and $B_{\pitchfork}$ as "B-transverse". There are also various possibilities. If both $B_{\pitchfork}$ and B_{τ} have empty boundary, the foliated chart models codimension-q foliations of n-manifolds without boundary. If one, but not both of these rectangular neighborhoods has boundary, the foliated chart models the various possibilities for foliations of n-manifolds with boundary and without corners. Specifically, if ∂$B_{\pitchfork}$ ≠ ∅ = ∂B_{τ}, then ∂U = ∂_{τ}U is a union of plaques and the foliation by plaques is tangent to the boundary. If ∂B_{τ} ≠ ∅ = ∂$B_{\pitchfork}$, then ∂U = $\partial_{\pitchfork}U$ is a union of transversals and the foliation is transverse to the boundary. Finally, if ∂$B_{\pitchfork}$ ≠ ∅ ≠ ∂B_{τ}, this is a model of a foliated manifold with a corner separating the tangential boundary from the transverse boundary.

(a) Foliation tangent to the boundary ∂$B_{\pitchfork}$ ≠ ∅ = ∂B_{τ}; (b) Foliation transverse to the boundary ∂B_{τ} ≠ ∅ = ∂$B_{\pitchfork}$; (c) Foliation with a corner separating the tangential boundary from the transverse boundary ∂$B_{\pitchfork}$ ≠ ∅ ≠ ∂B_{τ}.

A foliated atlas of codimension q and class C^{r} (0 ≤ r ≤ ∞) on the n-manifold M is a C^{r}-atlas $\mathcal{U} = \{(U_{\alpha}, \varphi_{\alpha})\mid \alpha \in A\}$ of foliated charts of codimension q which are coherently foliated in the sense that, whenever P and Q are plaques in distinct charts of $\mathcal{U}$, then P ∩ Q is open both in P and Q.

A useful way to reformulate the notion of coherently foliated charts is to write for w ∈ U_{α} ∩ U_{β}

$$\varphi_{\alpha} (w) = \left ( x_{\alpha} (w), y_{\alpha} (w) \right ) \in B_{\tau}^{\alpha} \times B_{\pitchfork}^{\alpha},$$
$$\varphi_{\beta} (w) = \left ( x_{\beta} (w), y_{\beta} (w) \right ) \in B_{\tau}^{\beta} \times B_{\pitchfork}^{\beta}.$$

The notation (U_{α},φ_{α}) is often written (U_{α},x_{α},y_{α}), with

$$x_{\alpha} = \left (x_{\alpha}^1, \dots,x_{\alpha}^p \right ),$$
$$y_{\alpha} = \left (y_{\alpha}^1, \dots,y_{\alpha}^q \right ).$$

On φ_{β}(U_{α} ∩ U_{β}) the coordinates formula can be changed as

$$g_{\alpha \beta} \left ( x_{\beta},y_{\beta} \right ) = \varphi_{\alpha} \circ \varphi_{\beta}^{-1} \left ( x_{\beta}, y_{\beta} \right ) = \left ( x_{\alpha} \left ( x_{\beta}, y_{\beta} \right ), y_{\alpha} \left ( x_{\beta}, y_{\beta} \right ) \right ).$$

Plaques of U_{α} each meet two plaques of U_{β}.

The condition that (U_{α},x_{α},y_{α}) and (U_{β},x_{β},y_{β}) be coherently foliated means that, if P ⊂ U_{α} is a plaque, the connected components of P ∩ U_{β} lie in (possibly distinct) plaques of U_{β}. Equivalently, since the plaques of U_{α} and U_{β} are level sets of the transverse coordinates y_{α} and y_{β}, respectively, each point z ∈ U_{α} ∩ U_{β} has a neighborhood in which the formula

$$y_\alpha = y_\alpha(x_\beta, y_\beta) = y_\alpha(y_\beta)$$

is independent of x_{β}.

The main use of foliated atlases is to link their overlapping plaques to form the leaves of a foliation. For this and other purposes, the general definition of foliated atlas above is a bit clumsy. One problem is that a plaque of (U_{α},φ_{α}) can meet multiple plaques of (U_{β},φ_{β}). It can even happen that a plaque of one chart meets infinitely many plaques of another chart. However, no generality is lost in assuming the situation to be much more regular as shown below.

Two foliated atlases $\mathcal{U}$ and $\mathcal{V}$ on M of the same codimension and smoothness class C^{r} are coherent $\left ( \mathcal{U} \thickapprox \mathcal{V} \right )$ if $\mathcal{U} \cup \mathcal{V}$ is a foliated C^{r}-atlas. Coherence of foliated atlases is an equivalence relation.

Proof

Reflexivity and symmetry are immediate. To prove transitivity let $\mathcal{U} \thickapprox \mathcal{V}$ and $\mathcal{V} \thickapprox \mathcal{W}$. Let (U_{α},x_{α},y_{α}) ∈ $\mathcal{U}$ and (W_{λ},x_{λ},y_{λ}) ∈ $\mathcal{W}$ and suppose that there is a point w ∈ U_{α} ∩ W_{λ}. Choose (V_{δ},x_{δ},y_{δ}) ∈ $\mathcal{V}$ such that w ∈ V_{δ}. By the above remarks, there is a neighborhood N of w in U_{α} ∩ V_{δ} ∩ W_{λ} such that

$$y_\delta = y_\delta( y_\lambda) \quad \text{on} \quad \varphi_\lambda ( N ),$$
$$y_\alpha = y_\alpha(y_\delta) \quad \text{on} \quad \varphi_\delta ( N ),$$

and hence

$$y_{\alpha} = y_\alpha \left ( y_\delta( y_\lambda) \right ) \quad \text{on} \quad \varphi_\delta ( N ).$$

Since w ∈ U_{α} ∩ W_{λ} is arbitrary, it can be concluded that y_{α}(x_{λ},y_{λ}) is locally independent of x_{λ}. It is thus proven that $\mathcal{U} \thickapprox \mathcal{W}$, hence that coherence is transitive.

Sample charts in a regular foliated atlas.

Plaques and transversals defined above on open sets are also open. But one can speak also of closed plaques and transversals. Namely, if (U,φ) and (W,ψ) are foliated charts such that $\overline{U}$ (the closure of U) is a subset of W and φ = ψ|U then, if $\varphi(U) = B_{\tau} \times B_{\pitchfork},$ it can be seen that $\psi|\overline{U}$, written $\overline{\varphi}$, carries $\overline{U}$ diffeomorphically onto $\overline{B}_{\tau} \times \overline{B}_{\pitchfork}.$

A foliated atlas is said to be regular if

1. for each α ∈ A, $\overline{U}_{\alpha}$ is a compact subset of a foliated chart (W_{α},ψ_{α}) and φ_{α} = ψ_{α}|U_{α};
2. the cover {U_{α} | α ∈ A} is locally finite;
3. if (U_{α},φ_{α}) and (U_{β},φ_{β}) are elements of the foliated atlas, then the interior of each closed plaque P ⊂ $\overline{U}_{\alpha}$ meets at most one plaque in $\overline{U}_{\beta}.$

By property (1), the coordinates x_{α} and y_{α} extend to coordinates $\overline{x}_{\alpha}$ and $\overline{y}_{\alpha}$ on $\overline{U}_{\alpha}$ and one writes $\overline{\varphi}_{\alpha} = \left (\overline{x}_{\alpha},\overline{y}_{\alpha} \right ).$ Property (3) is equivalent to requiring that, if U_{α} ∩ U_{β} ≠ ∅, the transverse coordinate changes $\overline{y}_{\alpha} = \overline{y}_{\alpha} \left ( \overline{x}_{\beta}, \overline{y}_{\beta} \right )$ be independent of $\overline{x}_{\beta}.$ That is

$$\overline{g}_{\alpha \beta} = \overline{\varphi}_{\alpha} \circ \overline{\varphi}_{\beta}^{-1} : \overline{\varphi}_{\beta} \left ( \overline{U}_{\alpha} \cap \overline{U}_{\beta} \right ) \rightarrow \overline{\varphi}_{\alpha} \left ( \overline{U}_{\alpha} \cap \overline{U}_{\beta} \right )$$

has the formula

$$\overline{g}_{\alpha \beta} \left ( \overline{x}_{\beta}, \overline{y}_{\beta} \right ) = \left ( \overline{x}_{\alpha} \left ( \overline{x}_{\beta}, \overline{y}_{\beta} \right ), \overline{y}_{\alpha} \left ( \overline{y}_{\beta} \right ) \right ).$$

Similar assertions hold also for open charts (without the overlines). The transverse coordinate map y_{α} can be viewed as a submersion

$$y_{\alpha} : U_{\alpha} \rightarrow \mathbb{R}^q$$

and the formulas y_{α} = y_{α}(y_{β}) can be viewed as diffeomorphisms

$$\gamma_{\alpha \beta} : y_{\beta} \left ( U_{\alpha} \cap U_{\beta} \right ) \rightarrow y_{\alpha} \left ( U_{\alpha} \cap U_{\beta} \right ).$$

These satisfy the cocycle conditions. That is, on y_{δ}(U_{α} ∩ U_{β} ∩ U_{δ}),

$$\gamma_{\alpha \delta} = \gamma_{\alpha \beta} \circ \gamma_{\beta \delta}$$

and, in particular,

$$\gamma_{\alpha \alpha} \equiv y_{\alpha} \left ( U_{\alpha} \right ),$$
$$\gamma_{\alpha \beta} = \gamma_{\beta \alpha}^{-1}.$$

Using the above definitions for coherence and regularity it can be proven that every foliated atlas has a coherent refinement that is regular.

Proof

Fix a metric on M and a foliated atlas $\mathcal{W}.$ Passing to a subcover, if necessary, one can assume that $\mathcal{W} = \left \{ W_j,\psi_j \right \}_{j=1}^l$ is finite. Let ε > 0 be a Lebesgue number for $\mathcal{W}.$ That is, any subset X ⊆ M of diameter < ε lies entirely in some W_{j}. For each x ∈ M, choose j such that x ∈ W_{j} and choose a foliated chart (U_{x}, φ_{x}) such that

x ∈ U_{x} ⊆ $\overline{U}_x$ ⊂ W_{j},
φ_{x} = ψ_{j}|U_{x},
diam(U_{x}) < ε/2.

Suppose that U_{x} ⊂ W_{k}, k ≠ j, and write ψ_{k} = (x_{k},y_{k}) as usual, where y_{k} : W_{k} → R^{q} is the transverse coordinate map. This is a submersion having the plaques in W_{k} as level sets. Thus, y_{k} restricts to a submersion y_{k} : U_{x} → R^{q}.

This is locally constant in x_{j}; so choosing U_{x} smaller, if necessary, one can assume that y_{k}|$\overline{U}_x$ has the plaques of $\overline{U}_x$ as its level sets. That is, each plaque of W_{k} meets (hence contains) at most one (compact) plaque of $\overline{U}_x$. Since 1 < k < l < ∞, one can choose U_{x} so that, whenever U_{x} ⊂ W_{k}, distinct plaques of $\overline{U}_x$ lie in distinct plaques of W_{k}. Pass to a finite subatlas $\mathcal{U} = \left \{U_i,\varphi_i \right \}_{i=1}^N$ of {(U_{x},φ_{x}) | x ∈ M}. If U_{i} ∩ U_{j} ≠ 0, then diam(U_{i} ∪ U_{j}) < ε, and so there is an index k such that $\overline{U}_i \cup \overline{U}_j \subseteq W_k.$ Distinct plaques of $\overline{U}_i$ (respectively, of $\overline{U}_j$) lie in distinct plaques of W_{k}. Hence each plaque of $\overline{U}_i$ has interior meeting at most one plaque of $\overline{U}_j$ and vice versa. By construction, $\mathcal{U}$ is a coherent refinement of $\mathcal{W}$ and is a regular foliated atlas.

If M is not compact, local compactness and second countability allows one to choose a sequence $\left \{ K_i \right \}_{i=0}^{\infty}$ of compact subsets such that K_{i} ⊂ int K_{i+1} for each i ≥ 0 and $M = \bigcup_{i=1}^{\infty} K_i.$ Passing to a subatlas, it is assumed that $\mathcal{W} = \left \{ W_j, \psi_j \right \}_{j=0}^{\infty}$ is countable and a strictly increasing sequence $\left \{ n_l \right \}_{l=0}^{\infty}$ of positive integers can be found such that $\mathcal{W}_l = \left \{ W_j, \psi_j \right \}_{j=0}^{n_l}$ covers K_{l}. Let δ_{l} denote the distance from K_{l} to ∂K_{l+1} and choose ε_{l} > 0 so small that ε_{l} < min{δ_{l}/2,ε_{l-1}} for l ≥ 1, ε_{0} < δ_{0}/2, and ε_{l} is a Lebesgue number for $\mathcal{W}_l$ (as an open cover of K_{l}) and for $\mathcal{W}_{l+1}$ (as an open cover of K_{l+1}). More precisely, if X ⊂ M meets K_{l} (respectively, K_{l+1}) and diam X < ε_{l}, then X lies in some element of $\mathcal{W}_l$ (respectively, $\mathcal{W}_{l+1}$). For each x ∈ K_{l} $\diagdown$ int K_{l-1}, construct (U_{x},φ_{x}) as for the compact case, requiring that $\overline{U}_x$ be a compact subset of W_{j} and that φ_{x} = ψ_{j}|U_{x}, some j ≤ n_{l}. Also, require that diam$\overline{U}_x$ < ε_{l}/2. As before, pass to a finite subcover $\left \{U_i,\varphi_i \right \}_{i=n_{l-1} + 1}^{n_l}$ of K_{l} $\diagdown$ int K_{l-1}. (Here, it is taken n_{−1} = 0.) This creates a regular foliated atlas $\mathcal{U} = \left \{U_i,\varphi_i \right \}_{i=1}^{\infty}$ that refines $\mathcal{W}$ and is coherent with $\mathcal{W}.$.

== Foliation definitions ==
Several alternative definitions of foliation exist depending on the way through which the foliation is achieved. The most common way to achieve a foliation is through decomposition reaching to the following

Decomposition through the coordinates function x : U→R^{n}.

Definition. A p-dimensional, class C^{r} foliation of an n-dimensional manifold M is a decomposition of M into a union of disjoint connected submanifolds {L_{α}}_{α∈A}, called the leaves of the foliation, with the following property: Every point in M has a neighborhood U and a system of local, class C^{r} coordinates x=(x^{1}, ⋅⋅⋅, x^{n}) : U→R^{n} such that for each leaf L_{α}, the components of U ∩ L_{α} are described by the equations x^{p+1}=constant, ⋅⋅⋅, x^{n}=constant. A foliation is denoted by $\mathcal{F}$={L_{α}}_{α∈A}.

The notion of leaves allows for an intuitive way of thinking about a foliation. For a slightly more geometrical definition, a p-dimensional foliation $\mathcal{F}$ of an n-manifold M may be thought of as simply a collection {M_{a}} of pairwise-disjoint, connected, immersed p-dimensional submanifolds (the leaves of the foliation) of M, such that for every point x in M, there is a chart $(U,\varphi)$ with U homeomorphic to R^{n} containing x such that every leaf, M_{a}, meets U in either the empty set or a countable collection of subspaces whose images under $\varphi$ in $\varphi (M_a \cap U)$ are p-dimensional affine subspaces whose first n − p coordinates are constant.

Locally, every foliation is a submersion allowing the following

Definition. Let M and Q be manifolds of dimension n and q≤n respectively, and let f : M→Q be a submersion, that is, suppose that the rank of the function differential (the Jacobian) is q. It follows from the implicit function theorem that ƒ induces a codimension-q foliation on M where the leaves are defined to be the components of f^{−1}(x) for x ∈ Q.

This definition describes a dimension-p foliation $\mathcal{F}$ of an n-dimensional manifold M that is a covered by charts U_{i} together with maps

$$\varphi_i:U_i \to \mathbb{R}^n$$

such that for overlapping pairs U_{i}, U_{j} the transition functions φ_{ij} : R^{n} → R^{n} defined by

$$\varphi_{ij} =\varphi_j \varphi_i^{-1}$$

take the form

$$\varphi_{ij}(x,y) = (\varphi_{ij}^1(x),\varphi_{ij}^2(x,y))$$

where x denotes the first q = n − p coordinates, and y denotes the last p co-ordinates. That is,

$$\begin{align}
\varphi_{ij}^1:{} &\mathbb{R}^q\to\mathbb{R}^q \\
\varphi_{ij}^2:{} &\mathbb{R}^n\to\mathbb{R}^p
\end{align}$$

The splitting of the transition functions φ_{ij} into $\varphi_{ij}^1(x)$ and $\varphi_{ij}^2(x,y)$ as a part of the submersion is completely analogous to the splitting of $\overline{g}_{\alpha \beta}$ into $\overline{y}_{\alpha} \left ( \overline{y}_{\beta} \right )$ and $\overline{x}_{\alpha} \left ( \overline{x}_{\beta}, \overline{y}_{\beta} \right )$ as a part of the definition of a regular foliated atlas. This makes possible another definition of foliations in terms of regular foliated atlases. To this end, one has to prove first that every regular foliated atlas of codimension q is associated to a unique foliation $\mathcal{F}$ of codimension q.

Proof

Let $\mathcal{U} = \left \{U_a,\varphi_{\alpha} \right \}_{\alpha \in A}$ be a regular foliated atlas of codimension q. Define an equivalence relation on M by setting x ~ y if and only if either there is a $\mathcal{U}$-plaque P_{0} such that x,y ∈ P_{0} or there is a sequence L = {P_{0},P_{1},⋅⋅⋅,P_{p}} of $\mathcal{U}$-plaques such that x ∈ P_{0}, y ∈ P_{p}, and P_{i} ∩ P_{i-1} ≠ ∅ with 1 ≤ i ≤ p. The sequence L will be called a plaque chain of length p connecting x and y. In the case that x,y ∈ P_{0}, it is said that {P_{0}} is a plaque chain of length 0 connecting x and y. The fact that ~ is an equivalence relation is clear. It is also clear that each equivalence class L is a union of plaques. Since $\mathcal{U}$-plaques can only overlap in open subsets of each other, L is locally a topologically immersed submanifold of dimension n − q. The open subsets of the plaques P ⊂ L form the base of a locally Euclidean topology on L of dimension n − q and L is clearly connected in this topology. It is also trivial to check that L is Hausdorff. The main problem is to show that L is second countable. Since each plaque is 2nd countable, the same will hold for L if it is shown that the set of $\mathcal{U}$-plaques in L is at most countably infinite. Fix one such plaque P_{0}. By the definition of a regular, foliated atlas, P_{0} meets only finitely many other plaques. That is, there are only finitely many plaque chains {P_{0},P_{i}} of length 1. By induction on the length p of plaque chains that begin at P_{0}, it is similarly proven that there are only finitely many of length ≤ p. Since every $\mathcal{U}$-plaque in L is, by the definition of ~, reached by a finite plaque chain starting at P_{0}, the assertion follows.

As shown in the proof, the leaves of the foliation are equivalence classes of plaque chains of length ≤ p which are also topologically immersed Hausdorff p-dimensional submanifolds. Next, it is shown that the equivalence relation of plaques on a leaf is expressed in equivalence of coherent foliated atlases in respect to their association with a foliation. More specifically, if $\mathcal{U}$ and $\mathcal{V}$ are foliated atlases on M and if $\mathcal{U}$ is associated to a foliation $\mathcal{F}$ then $\mathcal{U}$ and $\mathcal{V}$ are coherent if and only if $\mathcal{V}$ is also associated to $\mathcal{F}$.

Proof

If $\mathcal{V}$ is also associated to $\mathcal{F}$, every leaf L is a union of $\mathcal{V}$-plaques and of $\mathcal{U}$-plaques. These plaques are open subsets in the manifold topology of L, hence intersect in open subsets of each other. Since plaques are connected, a $\mathcal{U}$-plaque cannot intersect a $\mathcal{V}$-plaque unless they lie in a common leaf; so the foliated atlases are coherent. Conversely, if we only know that $\mathcal{U}$ is associated to $\mathcal{F}$ and that $\mathcal{V} \approx \mathcal{U}$, let Q be a $\mathcal{V}$-plaque. If L is a leaf of $\mathcal{F}$ and w ∈ L ∩ Q, let P ∈ L be a $\mathcal{U}$-plaque with w ∈ P. Then P ∩ Q is an open neighborhood of w in Q and P ∩ Q ⊂ L ∩ Q. Since w ∈ L ∩ Q is arbitrary, it follows that L ∩ Q is open in Q. Since L is an arbitrary leaf, it follows that Q decomposes into disjoint open subsets, each of which is the intersection of Q with some leaf of $\mathcal{F}$. Since Q is connected, L ∩ Q = Q. Finally, Q is an arbitrary $\mathcal{V}$-plaque, and so $\mathcal{V}$ is associated to $\mathcal{F}$.

It is now obvious that the correspondence between foliations on M and their associated foliated atlases induces a one-to-one correspondence between the set of foliations on M and the set of coherence classes of foliated atlases or, in other words, a foliation $\mathcal{F}$ of codimension q and class C^{r} on M is a coherence class of foliated atlases of codimension q and class C^{r} on M. By Zorn's lemma, it is obvious that every coherence class of foliated atlases contains a unique maximal foliated atlas. Thus,

Definition. A foliation of codimension q and class C^{r} on M is a maximal foliated C^{r}-atlas of codimension q on M.

In practice, a relatively small foliated atlas is generally used to represent a foliation. Usually, it is also required this atlas to be regular.

In the chart U_{i}, the stripes x = constant match up with the stripes on other charts U_{j}. These submanifolds piece together from chart to chart to form maximal connected injectively immersed submanifolds called the leaves of the foliation.

If one shrinks the chart U_{i} it can be written as U_{ix} × U_{iy}, where U_{ix} ⊂ R^{n−p}, U_{iy} ⊂ R^{p}, U_{iy} is homeomorphic to the plaques, and the points of U_{ix} parametrize the plaques in U_{i}. If one picks y_{0} in U_{iy}, then U_{ix} × {y_{0}} is a submanifold of U_{i} that intersects every plaque exactly once. This is called a local transversal section of the foliation. Note that due to monodromy global transversal sections of the foliation might not exist.

The case r = 0 is rather special. Those C^{0} foliations that arise in practice are usually "smooth-leaved". More precisely, they are of class C^{r,0}, in the following sense.

Definition. A foliation $\mathcal{F}$ is of class C^{r,k}, r > k ≥ 0, if the corresponding coherence class of foliated atlases contains a regular foliated atlas {U_{α},x_{α},y_{α}}_{α∈A} such that the change of coordinate formula

$$g_{\alpha \beta}(x_\beta, y_\beta) = ( x_\alpha( x_\beta, y_\beta), y_\alpha ( y_\beta)).$$

is of class C^{k}, but x_{α} is of class C^{r} in the coordinates x_{β} and its mixed x_{β} partials of orders ≤ r are C^{k} in the coordinates (x_{β},y_{β}).

The above definition suggests the more general concept of a foliated space or abstract lamination. One relaxes the condition that the transversals be open, relatively compact subsets of R^{q}, allowing the transverse coordinates y_{α} to take their values in some more general topological space Z. The plaques are still open, relatively compact subsets of R^{p}, the change of transverse coordinate formula y_{α}(y_{β}) is continuous and x_{α}(x_{β},y_{β}) is of class C^{r} in the coordinates x_{β} and its mixed x_{β} partials of orders ≤ r are continuous in the coordinates (x_{β},y_{β}). One usually requires M and Z to be locally compact, second countable and metrizable. This may seem like a rather wild generalization, but there are contexts in which it is useful.

== Holonomy ==
Let (M, $\mathcal{F}$) be a foliated manifold. If L is a leaf of $\mathcal{F}$ and s is a path in L, one is interested in the behavior of the foliation in a neighborhood of s in M. Intuitively, an inhabitant of the leaf walks along the path s, keeping an eye on all of the nearby leaves. As they (hereafter denoted by s(t)) proceed, some of these leaves may "peel away", getting out of visual range, others may suddenly come into range and approach L asymptotically, others may follow along in a more or less parallel fashion or wind around L laterally, etc. If s is a loop, then s(t) repeatedly returns to the same point s(t_{0}) as t goes to infinity and each time more and more leaves may have spiraled into view or out of view, etc. This behavior, when appropriately formalized, is called the holonomy of the foliation.

Holonomy is implemented on foliated manifolds in various specific ways: the total holonomy group of foliated bundles, the holonomy pseudogroup of general foliated manifolds, the germinal holonomy groupoid of general foliated manifolds, the germinal holonomy group of a leaf, and the infinitesimal holonomy group of a leaf.

=== Foliated bundles ===
The easiest case of holonomy to understand is the total holonomy of a foliated bundle. This is a generalization of the notion of a Poincaré map.

A cross section N and first return map f where M = S^{1} × D^{2} and N = D^{2}.

The term "first return (recurrence) map" comes from the theory of dynamical systems. Let Φ_{t} be a nonsingular C^{r} flow (r ≥ 1) on the compact n-manifold M. In applications, one can imagine that M is a cyclotron or some closed loop with fluid flow. If M has a boundary, the flow is assumed to be tangent to the boundary. The flow generates a 1-dimensional foliation $\mathcal{F}$. If one remembers the positive direction of flow, but otherwise forgets the parametrization (shape of trajectory, velocity, etc.), the underlying foliation $\mathcal{F}$ is said to be oriented. Suppose that the flow admits a global cross section N. That is, N is a compact, properly embedded, C^{r} submanifold of M of dimension n – 1, the foliation $\mathcal{F}$ is transverse to N, and every flow line meets N. Because the dimensions of N and of the leaves are complementary, the transversality condition is that

$$T_y (M) = T_y(\mathcal{F}) \oplus T_y(N) \text{ for each } y\in N.$$

Let y ∈ N and consider the ω-limit set ω(y) of all accumulation points in M of all sequences $\left \{\Phi_{t_k}(y)\right\}_{k=1}^\infty$, where t_{k} goes to infinity. It can be shown that ω(y) is compact, nonempty, and a union of flow lines. If $z = \lim_{k \rightarrow \infty} \Phi_{t_k} \in \omega(y),$ there is a value t* ∈ R such that Φ_{t*}(z) ∈ N and it follows that

$$\lim_{k \to \infty} \Phi_{t_k + t^\ast} (y) = \Phi_{t^\ast}(z) \in N.$$

Since N is compact and $\mathcal{F}$ is transverse to N, it follows that the set {t > 0 | Φ_{t}(y) ∈ N} is a monotonically increasing sequence $\{\tau_k(y)\}_{k=1}^\infty$ that diverges to infinity.

As y ∈ N varies, let τ(y) = τ_{1}(y), defining in this way a positive function τ ∈ C^{r}(N) (the first return time) such that, for arbitrary y ∈ N, Φ_{t}(y) ∉ N, 0 < t < τ(y), and Φ_{τ(y)}(y) ∈ N.

Define f : N → N by the formula f(y) = Φ_{τ(y)}(y). This is a C^{r} map. If the flow is reversed, exactly the same construction provides the inverse f^{−1}; so f ∈ Diff^{r}(N). This diffeomorphism is the first return map and τ is called the first return time. While the first return time depends on the parametrization of the flow, it should be evident that f depends only on the oriented foliation $\mathcal{F}$. It is possible to reparametrize the flow Φ_{t}, keeping it nonsingular, of class C^{r}, and not reversing its direction, so that τ ≡ 1.

The assumption that there is a cross section N to the flow is very restrictive, implying that M is the total space of a fiber bundle over S^{1}. Indeed, on R × N, define ~_{f} to be the equivalence relation generated by

$$(t,y) \sim_f (t-1,f(y)).$$

Equivalently, this is the orbit equivalence for the action of the additive group Z on R × N defined by

$$k \cdot (t,y) = (t - k,f^k(y) ),$$

for each k ∈ Z and for each (t,y) ∈ R × N. The mapping cylinder of f is defined to be the C^{r} manifold

$$M_f = (\mathbb{R} \times N)/{\sim_f}.$$

By the definition of the first return map f and the assumption that the first return time is τ ≡ 1, it is immediate that the map

$$\Phi : \mathbb{R} \times N \rightarrow M.$$

defined by the flow, induces a canonical C^{r} diffeomorphism

$$\varphi : M_f \rightarrow M.$$

If we make the identification M_{f} = M, then the projection of R × N onto R induces a C^{r} map

$$\pi : M \rightarrow \mathbb{R} / \mathbb{Z} = S^1$$

that makes M into the total space of a fiber bundle over the circle. This is just the projection of S^{1} × D^{2} onto S^{1}. The foliation $\mathcal{F}$ is transverse to the fibers of this bundle and the bundle projection π, restricted to each leaf L, is a covering map π : L → S^{1}. This is called a foliated bundle.

Take as basepoint x_{0} ∈ S^{1} the equivalence class 0 + Z; so π^{−1}(x_{0}) is the original cross section N. For each loop s on S^{1}, based at x_{0}, the homotopy class [s] ∈ π_{1}(S^{1},x_{0}) is uniquely characterized by deg s ∈ Z. The loop s lifts to a path in each flow line and it should be clear that the lift s_{y} that starts at y ∈ N ends at f^{k}(y) ∈ N, where k = deg s. The diffeomorphism f^{k} ∈ Diff^{r}(N) is also denoted by h_{s} and is called the total holonomy of the loop s. Since this depends only on [s], this is a definition of a homomorphism

$$h : \pi_1(S^1,x_0) \rightarrow \operatorname{Diff}^{\,r}(N),$$

called the total holonomy homomorphism for the foliated bundle.

Using fiber bundles in a more direct manner, let (M,$\mathcal{F}$) be a foliated n-manifold of codimension q. Let π : M → B be a fiber bundle with q-dimensional fiber F and connected base space B. Assume that all of these structures are of class C^{r}, 0 ≤ r ≤ ∞, with the condition that, if r = 0, B supports a C^{1} structure. Since every maximal C^{1} atlas on B contains a C^{∞} subatlas, no generality is lost in assuming that B is as smooth as desired. Finally, for each x ∈ B, assume that there is a connected, open neighborhood U ⊆ B of x and a local trivialization

$$\begin{matrix}
\pi^{-1}(U) & \xrightarrow{\varphi} & U\times{F} \\
\scriptstyle{\pi} \Bigg\downarrow & {\qquad} & \Bigg\downarrow{\scriptstyle{p}} \\
U & \xrightarrow{\text{id}} & U
\end{matrix}$$

where φ is a C^{r} diffeomorphism (a homeomorphism, if r = 0) that carries $\mathcal{F} \mid \pi^{-1}(U)$ to the product foliation {U × {y}}_{y ∈ F}. Here, $\mathcal{F} \mid \pi^{-1}(U)$ is the foliation with leaves the connected components of L ∩ π^{−1}(U), where L ranges over the leaves of $\mathcal{F}$. This is the general definition of the term "foliated bundle" (M,$\mathcal{F}$,π) of class C^{r}.

$\mathcal{F}$ is transverse to the fibers of π (it is said that $\mathcal{F}$ is transverse to the fibration) and that the restriction of π to each leaf L of $\mathcal{F}$ is a covering map π : L → B. In particular, each fiber F_{x} = π^{−1}(x) meets every leaf of $\mathcal{F}$. The fiber is a cross section of $\mathcal{F}$ in complete analogy with the notion of a cross section of a flow.

The foliation $\mathcal{F}$ being transverse to the fibers does not, of itself, guarantee that the leaves are covering spaces of B. A simple version of the problem is a foliation of R^{2}, transverse to the fibration

$$\pi : \mathbb{R}^2 \rightarrow \mathbb{R},$$
$$\pi(x,y) = x,$$

but with infinitely many leaves missing the y-axis. In the respective figure, it is intended that the "arrowed" leaves, and all above them, are asymptotic to the axis x = 0. One calls such a foliation incomplete relative to the fibration, meaning that some of the leaves "run off to infinity" as the parameter x ∈ B approaches some x_{0} ∈ B. More precisely, there may be a leaf L and a continuous path s : [0,a) → L such that lim_{t→a−}π(s(t)) = x_{0} ∈ B, but lim_{t→a−}s(t) does not exist in the manifold topology of L. This is analogous to the case of incomplete flows, where some flow lines "go to infinity" in finite time. Although such a leaf L may elsewhere meet π^{−1}(x_{0}), it cannot evenly cover a neighborhood of x_{0}, hence cannot be a covering space of B under π. When F is compact, however, it is true that transversality of $\mathcal{F}$ to the fibration does guarantee completeness, hence that $(M,\mathcal{F},\pi)$ is a foliated bundle.

There is an atlas $\mathcal{U}$ = {U_{α},x_{α}}_{α∈A} on B, consisting of open, connected coordinate charts, together with trivializations φ_{α} : π^{−1}(U_{α}) → U_{α} × F that carry $\mathcal{F}$|π^{−1}(U_{α}) to the product foliation. Set W_{α} = π^{−1}(U_{α}) and write φ_{α} = (x_{α},y_{α}) where (by abuse of notation) x_{α} represents x_{α} $\circ$ π and y_{α} : π^{−1}(U_{α}) → F is the submersion obtained by composing φ_{α} with the canonical projection U_{α} × F → F.

The atlas $\mathcal{W}$ = {W_{α},x_{α},y_{α}}_{α∈A} plays a role analogous to that of a foliated atlas. The plaques of W_{α} are the level sets of y_{α} and this family of plaques is identical to F via y_{α}. Since B is assumed to support a C^{∞} structure, according to the Whitehead theorem one can fix a Riemannian metric on B and choose the atlas $\mathcal{U}$ to be geodesically convex. Thus, U_{α} ∩ U_{β} is always connected. If this intersection is nonempty, each plaque of W_{α} meets exactly one plaque of W_{β}. Then define a holonomy cocycle $\gamma = \left \{ \gamma_{\alpha \beta} \right \}_{\alpha,\beta \in A}$ by setting

$$\gamma_{\alpha \beta} = y_\alpha \circ y_\beta^{-1} : F \rightarrow F.$$

== Examples ==
=== Flat space ===
Consider an n-dimensional space, foliated as a product by subspaces consisting of points whose first n − p coordinates are constant. This can be covered with a single chart. The statement is essentially that R^{n} = R^{n−p} × R^{p} with the leaves or plaques R^{p} being enumerated by R^{n−p}. The analogy is seen directly in three dimensions, by taking n = 3 and p = 2: the 2-dimensional leaves of a book are enumerated by a (1-dimensional) page number.

=== Bundles ===
A rather trivial example of foliations are products M = B × F, foliated by the leaves F_{b} = {b} × F, b ∈ B. (Another foliation of M is given by B_{f} = B × { f } , f ∈ F.)

A more general class are flat G-bundles with G = Homeo(F) for a manifold F. Given a representation ρ : π_{1}(B) → Homeo(F), the flat Homeo(F)-bundle with monodromy ρ is given by $M=\left(\widetilde{B}\times F\right)/\pi_1B$, where π_{1}(B) acts on the universal cover $\widetilde{B}$ by deck transformations and on F by means of the representation ρ.

Flat bundles fit into the framework of fiber bundles. A map π : M → B between manifolds is a fiber bundle if there is a manifold F such that each b ∈ B has an open neighborhood U such that there is a homeomorphism $\varphi:\pi^{-1}(U)\to U\times F$ with $\pi = p_1 \varphi$, with p_{1} : U × F → U projection to the first factor. The fiber bundle yields a foliation by fibers $F_b:=\pi^{-1}(\{b\}), b\in B$. Its space of leaves L is homeomorphic to B, in particular L is a Hausdorff manifold.

=== Coverings ===
If M → N is a covering map between manifolds, and F is a foliation on N, then it pulls back to a foliation on M. More generally, if the map is merely a branched covering, where the branch locus is transverse to the foliation, then the foliation can be pulled back.

=== Submersions ===
If M^{n} → N^{q}, (q ≤ n) is a submersion of manifolds, it follows from the inverse function theorem that the connected components of the fibers of the submersion define a codimension q foliation of M. Fiber bundles are an example of this type.

An example of a submersion, which is not a fiber bundle, is given by

$$\begin{cases} f:[-1,1]\times \mathbb{R}\to \mathbb{R} \\f(x,y)=(x^2-1) e^y\end{cases}$$

This submersion yields a foliation of [−1, 1] × R which is invariant under the Z-actions given by

$$z(x, y)= (x,y+n ), \quad \text{or} \quad z(x, y)=\left((-1)^nx, y\right)$$

for (x, y) ∈ [−1, 1] × R and n ∈ Z. The induced foliations of Z \ ([−1, 1] × R) are called the 2-dimensional Reeb foliation (of the annulus) resp. the 2-dimensional nonorientable Reeb foliation (of the Möbius band). Their leaf spaces are not Hausdorff.

=== Reeb foliations ===
Define a submersion

$$\begin{cases} f:D^{n}\times \mathbb{R}\to \mathbb{R} \\ f(r,\theta,t):=(r^2-1)e^t\end{cases}$$

where (r, θ) ∈ [0, 1] × S^{n−1} are cylindrical coordinates on the n-dimensional disk D^{n}. This submersion yields a foliation of D^{n} × R which is invariant under the Z-actions given by

$$z(x,y)=(x,y+z)$$

for (x, y) ∈ D^{n} × R, z ∈ Z. The induced foliation of Z \ (D^{n} × R) is called the n-dimensional Reeb foliation. Its leaf space is not Hausdorff.

For n = 2, this gives a foliation of the solid torus which can be used to define the Reeb foliation of the 3-sphere by gluing two solid tori along their boundary. Foliations of odd-dimensional spheres S^{2n+1} are also explicitly known.

=== Lie groups ===
If G is a Lie group, and H is a Lie subgroup, then G is foliated by cosets of H. When H is closed in G, the quotient space G/H is a smooth (Hausdorff) manifold turning G into a fiber bundle with fiber H and base G/H. This fiber bundle is actually principal, with structure group H.

=== Lie group actions ===
Let G be a Lie group acting smoothly on a manifold M. If the action is a locally free action or free action, then the orbits of G define a foliation of M.

=== Linear and Kronecker foliations ===
If $\tilde{X}$ is a nonsingular (i.e., nowhere zero) vector field, then the local flow defined by $\tilde{X}$ patches together to define a foliation of dimension 1. Indeed, given an arbitrary point x ∈ M, the fact that $\tilde{X}$ is nonsingular allows one to find a coordinate neighborhood (U,x^{1},...,x^{n}) about x such that

$$- \varepsilon < x^i < \varepsilon, \quad 1 \le i \le n,$$

and

$$\frac{\partial}{\partial x^1} = \tilde{X}\mid_U.$$

Geometrically, the flow lines of $\tilde{X} \mid_U$ are just the level sets

$$x^i = c^i, \quad 2 \le i \le n,$$

where all $|c^i| < \varepsilon.$ Since by convention manifolds are second countable, leaf anomalies like the "long line" are precluded by the second countability of M itself. The difficulty can be sidestepped by requiring that $\tilde{X}$ be a complete field (e.g., that M be compact), hence that each leaf be a flow line.

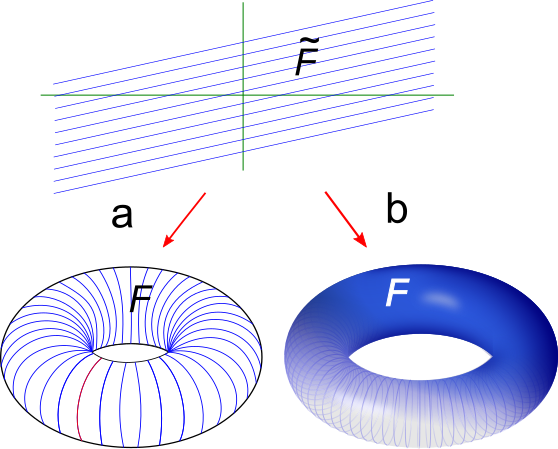
The linear foliation $\mathcal{\tilde{F}}$ on R^{2} passes to the foliation $\mathcal{F}$ on T^{2}. a) the slope is rational (linear foliation); b) the slope is irrational (Kronecker foliation).

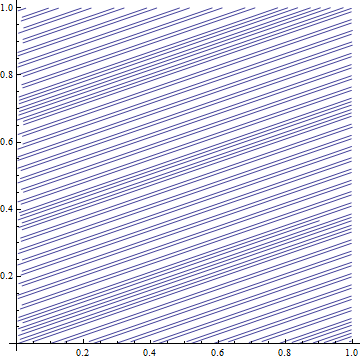
Irrational rotation on a 2-torus.

An important class of 1-dimensional foliations on the torus T^{2} are derived from projecting constant vector fields on T^{2}. A constant vector field

$$\tilde{X} \equiv \begin{bmatrix}a \\ b \end{bmatrix}$$

on R^{2} is invariant by all translations in R^{2}, hence passes to a well-defined vector field X when projected on the torus T^{2}= R^{2}/Z^{2}. It is assumed that a ≠ 0. The foliation $\mathcal{\tilde{F}}$ on R^{2} produced by $\tilde{X}$ has as leaves the parallel straight lines of slope θ = b/a. This foliation is also invariant under translations and passes to the foliation $\mathcal{F}$ on T^{2} produced by X.

Each leaf of $\mathcal{\tilde{F}}$ is of the form

$$\tilde{L} = \{(x_0 + ta,y_0 + tb)\}_{t \in \mathbb{R}}.$$

If the slope is rational then all leaves are closed curves homeomorphic to the circle. In this case, one can take a,b ∈ Z. For fixed t ∈ R, the points of $\tilde{L}$ corresponding to values of t ∈ t_{0} + Z all project to the same point of T^{2}; so the corresponding leaf L of $\mathcal{F}$ is an embedded circle in T^{2}. Since L is arbitrary, $\mathcal{F}$ is a foliation of T^{2} by circles. It follows rather easily that this foliation is actually a fiber bundle π : T^{2} → S^{1}. This is known as a linear foliation.

When the slope θ = b/a is irrational, the leaves are noncompact, homeomorphic to the non-compactified real line, and dense in the torus (cf Irrational rotation). The trajectory of each point (x_{0},y_{0}) never returns to the same point, but generates an "everywhere dense" winding about the torus, i.e. approaches arbitrarily close to any given point. Thus the closure to the trajectory is the entire two-dimensional torus. This case is named Kronecker foliation, after Leopold Kronecker and his

Kronecker's Density Theorem. If the real number θ is distinct from each rational multiple of π, then the set {e^{inθ} | n ∈ Z} is dense in the unit circle.

Proof

To see this, note first that, if a leaf $\tilde{L}$ of $\mathcal{\tilde{F}}$ does not project one-to-one into T^{2}, there must be a real number t ≠ 0 such that ta and tb are both integers. But this would imply that b/a ∈ Q. In order to show that each leaf L of $\mathcal{F}$ is dense in T^{2}, it is enough to show that, for every v ∈ R^{2}, each leaf $\tilde{L}$ of $\mathcal{\tilde{F}}$ achieves arbitrarily small positive distances from suitable points of the coset v + Z^{2}. A suitable translation in R^{2} allows one to assume that v = 0; so the task is reduced to showing that $\tilde{L}$ passes arbitrarily close to suitable points (n,m) ∈ Z^{2}. The line $\tilde{L}$ has slope-intercept equation

$$y = \theta x + c.$$

So it will suffice to find, for arbitrary η > 0, integers n and m such that

$$|\theta n + c - m| < \eta.$$

Equivalently, c ∈ R being arbitrary, one is reduced to showing that the set {θn − m}_{m,n∈Z} is dense in R. This is essentially the criterion of Eudoxus that θ and 1 be incommensurable (i.e., that θ be irrational).

A similar construction using a foliation of R^{n} by parallel lines yields a 1-dimensional foliation of the n-torus R^{n}/Z^{n} associated with the linear flow on the torus.

=== Suspension foliations ===
A flat bundle has not only its foliation by fibres but also a foliation transverse to the fibers, whose leaves are

$$L_f:= \left\{p\left(\tilde{b},f\right): \tilde{b}\in\widetilde{B}\right\}, \quad \mbox{ for }f\in F,$$

where $p:\widetilde{B}\times F\to M$ is the canonical projection. This foliation is called the suspension of the representation ρ : π_{1}(B) → Homeo(F).

In particular, if B = S^{1} and $\varphi:F\to F$ is a homeomorphism of F, then the suspension foliation of $\varphi$ is defined to be the suspension foliation of the representation ρ : Z → Homeo(F) given by ρ(z) = Φ^{z}. Its space of leaves is L = $\mathcal{F}$/~, where x ~ y whenever y = Φ^{n}(x) for some n ∈ Z.

The simplest example of foliation by suspension is a manifold X of dimension q. Let f : X → X be a bijection. One defines the suspension M = S^{1} ×_{f} X as the quotient of [0,1] × X by the equivalence relation (1,x) ~ (0,f(x)).

M = S^{1} ×_{f} X = [0,1] × X

Then automatically M carries two foliations: $\mathcal{F}$_{2} consisting of sets of the form F_{2,t} = {(t,x)_{~} : x ∈ X} and $\mathcal{F}$_{1} consisting of sets of the form F_{2,x_{0}} = {(t,x) : t ∈ [0,1] ,x ∈ O_{x_{0}}}, where the orbit O_{x_{0}} is defined as

O_{x_{0}} = {..., f^{−2}(x_{0}), f^{−1}(x_{0}), x_{0}, f(x_{0}), f^{2}(x_{0}), ...},

where the exponent refers to the number of times the function f is composed with itself. Note that O_{x_{0}} = O_{f(x_{0})} = O_{f^{−2}(x_{0})}, etc., so the same is true for F_{1,x_{0}}. Understanding the foliation $\mathcal{F}$_{1} is equivalent to understanding the dynamics of the map f. If the manifold X is already foliated, one can use the construction to increase the codimension of the foliation, as long as f maps leaves to leaves.

The Kronecker foliations of the 2-torus are the suspension foliations of the rotations R_{α} : S^{1} → S^{1} by angle α ∈ [0, 2π).

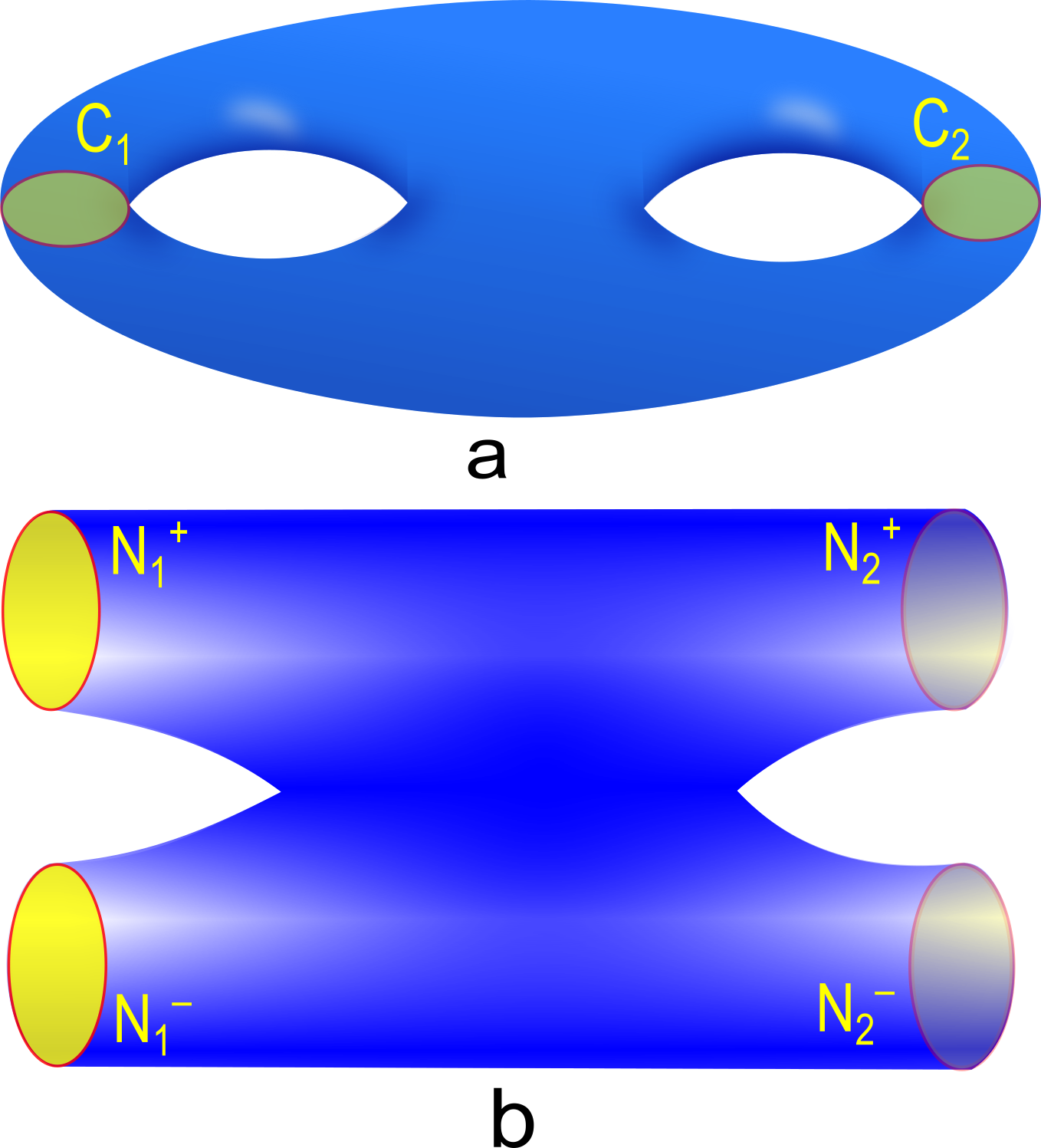
Suspension of 2-holed torus after cutting and re-gluing. a) Two-holed torus with the sections to be cut; b) the geometric figure after cutting with the four faces.

More specifically, if Σ = Σ_{2} is the two-holed torus with C^{1},C^{2} ∈ Σ the two embedded circles let $\mathcal{F}$ be the product foliation of the 3-manifold M = Σ × S^{1} with leaves Σ × {y}, y ∈ S^{1}. Note that N_{i} = C_{i} × S^{1} is an embedded torus and that $\mathcal{F}$ is transverse to N_{i}, i = 1,2. Let Diff_{+}(S^{1}) denote the group of orientation-preserving diffeomorphisms of S^{1} and choose f_{1},f_{2} ∈ Diff_{+}(S^{1}). Cut M apart along N_{1} and N_{2}, letting $N_i^{+}$ and $N_i^{-}$ denote the resulting copies of N_{i}, i = 1,2. At this point one has a manifold M' = Σ' × S_{1} with four boundary components $\left \{N_i^{\pm} \right \}_{i=1,2}.$ The foliation $\mathcal{F}$ has passed to a foliation $\mathcal{F^{\prime}}$ transverse to the boundary ∂M' , each leaf of which is of the form Σ' × {y}, y ∈ S^{1}.

This leaf meets ∂M' in four circles $C_i^{\pm} \times \{y\} \subset N_i^{\pm}.$ If z ∈ C_{i}, the corresponding points in $C_i^{\pm}$ are denoted by z^{±} and $N_i^{-}$ is "reglued" to $N_i^{+}$ by the identification

$$(z^{-},y) \equiv (z^{+},f_i(y)), \quad i = 1,2.$$

Since f_{1} and f_{2} are orientation-preserving diffeomorphisms of S^{1}, they are isotopic to the identity and the manifold obtained by this regluing operation is homeomorphic to M. The leaves of $\mathcal{F^{\prime}}$, however, reassemble to produce a new foliation $\mathcal{F}$(f_{1},f_{2}) of M. If a leaf L of $\mathcal{F}$(f_{1},f_{2}) contains a piece Σ' × {y_{0}}, then

$$L = \bigcup_{g \in G} \Sigma^{\prime} \times \{ g (y_0) \},$$

where G ⊂ Diff_{+}(S^{1}) is the subgroup generated by {f_{1},f_{2}}. These copies of Σ' are attached to one another by identifications

(z^{−},g(y_{0})) ≡ (z^{+},f_{1}(g(y_{0}))) for each z ∈ C_{1},
(z^{−},g(y_{0})) ≡ (z^{+},f_{2}(g(y_{0}))) for each z ∈ C_{2},

where g ranges over G. The leaf is completely determined by the G-orbit of y_{0} ∈ S^{1} and can he simple or immensely complicated. For instance, a leaf will be compact precisely if the corresponding G-orbit is finite. As an extreme example, if G is trivial (f_{1} = f_{2} = id_{S^{1}}), then $\mathcal{F}$(f_{1},f_{2}) = $\mathcal{F}$. If an orbit is dense in S^{1}, the corresponding leaf is dense in M. As an example, if f_{1} and f_{2} are rotations through rationally independent multiples of 2π, every leaf will be dense. In other examples, some leaf L has closure $\bar{L}$ that meets each factor {w} × S^{1} in a Cantor set. Similar constructions can be made on Σ × I, where I is a compact, nondegenerate interval. Here one takes f_{1},f_{2} ∈ Diff_{+}(I) and, since ∂I is fixed pointwise by all orientation-preserving diffeomorphisms, one gets a foliation having the two components of ∂M as leaves. When one forms M' in this case, one gets a foliated manifold with corners. In either case, this construction is called the suspension of a pair of diffeomorphisms and is a fertile source of interesting examples of codimension-one foliations.

== Foliations and integrability ==
There is a close relationship, assuming everything is smooth, with vector fields: given a vector field X on M that is never zero, its integral curves will give a 1-dimensional foliation. (i.e. a codimension n − 1 foliation).

This observation generalises to the Frobenius theorem, saying that the necessary and sufficient conditions for a distribution (i.e. an n − p dimensional subbundle of the tangent bundle of a manifold) to be tangent to the leaves of a foliation, is that the set of vector fields tangent to the distribution are closed under Lie bracket. One can also phrase this differently, as a question of reduction of the structure group of the tangent bundle from GL(n) to a reducible subgroup.

The conditions in the Frobenius theorem appear as integrability conditions; and the assertion is that if those are fulfilled the reduction can take place because local transition functions with the required block structure exist. For example, in the codimension 1 case, we can define the tangent bundle of the foliation as ker(α), for some (non-canonical) α ∈ Ω^{1} (i.e. a non-zero co-vector field). A given α is integrable iff α ∧ dα = 0 everywhere.

There is a global foliation theory, because topological constraints exist. For example, in the surface case, an everywhere non-zero vector field can exist on an orientable compact surface only for the torus. This is a consequence of the Poincaré–Hopf index theorem, which shows the Euler characteristic will have to be 0. There are many deep connections with contact topology, which is the "opposite" concept, requiring that the integrability condition is never satisfied.

== Existence of foliations ==
Haefliger (1970) gave a necessary and sufficient condition for a distribution on a connected non-compact manifold to be homotopic to an integrable distribution. Thurston (1974, 1976) showed that any compact manifold with a distribution has a foliation of the same dimension.

== See also ==
- G-structure – Structure group sub-bundle on a tangent frame bundle
- Haefliger structure – Generalization of a foliation closed under taking pullbacks.
- Lamination – Partitioned topological space
- Reeb foliation.
- Taut foliation – Concept in mathematics
