= List of things named after Élie Cartan =

These are things named after Élie Cartan (9 April 1869 – 6 May 1951), a French mathematician.

== Mathematics and physics ==
- Cartan calculus
- Cartan connection, Cartan connection applications
- Cartan's criterion
- Cartan decomposition
- Cartan's equivalence method
- Cartan formalism (physics)
- Cartan involution
- Cartan's magic formula
- Cartan relations
  - Cartan map
- Cartan matrix
- Cartan pair
- Cartan subalgebra
- Cartan subgroup
- Cartan's method of moving frames
- Cartan's theorem, a name for the closed-subgroup theorem
- Cartan's theorem, a name for the theorem on highest weights
- Cartan's theorem, a name for Lie's third theorem
- Einstein–Cartan theory
  - Einstein–Cartan–Evans theory
- Cartan–Ambrose–Hicks theorem
- Cartan–Brauer–Hua theorem
- Cartan–Dieudonné theorem
- Cartan–Hadamard manifold
- Cartan–Hadamard theorem
- Cartan–Iwahori decomposition
- Cartan-Iwasawa-Malcev theorem
- Cartan–Kähler theorem
- Cartan–Karlhede algorithm
- Cartan–Weyl theory
  - Cartan–Weyl basis
- Cartan–Killing form
- Cartan–Kuranishi prolongation theorem
- CAT(k) space
- Maurer–Cartan form
- Newton–Cartan theory
- Stokes–Cartan theorem, the generalized fundamental theorem of calculus, proven by Cartan (in its general form), also known as Stokes' theorem although Stokes neither formulated nor proved it.

== Other ==
- Cartan (crater)
- Élie Cartan Prize

Note some are after Henri Cartan, a son of É. Cartan; e.g.,

- Cartan's lemma (potential theory)
- Cartan seminar
- Cartan's theorems A and B
- Cartan–Eilenberg resolution
