= Société mathématique de France =

Professional society of French mathematicians

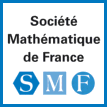
The logo of the SMF

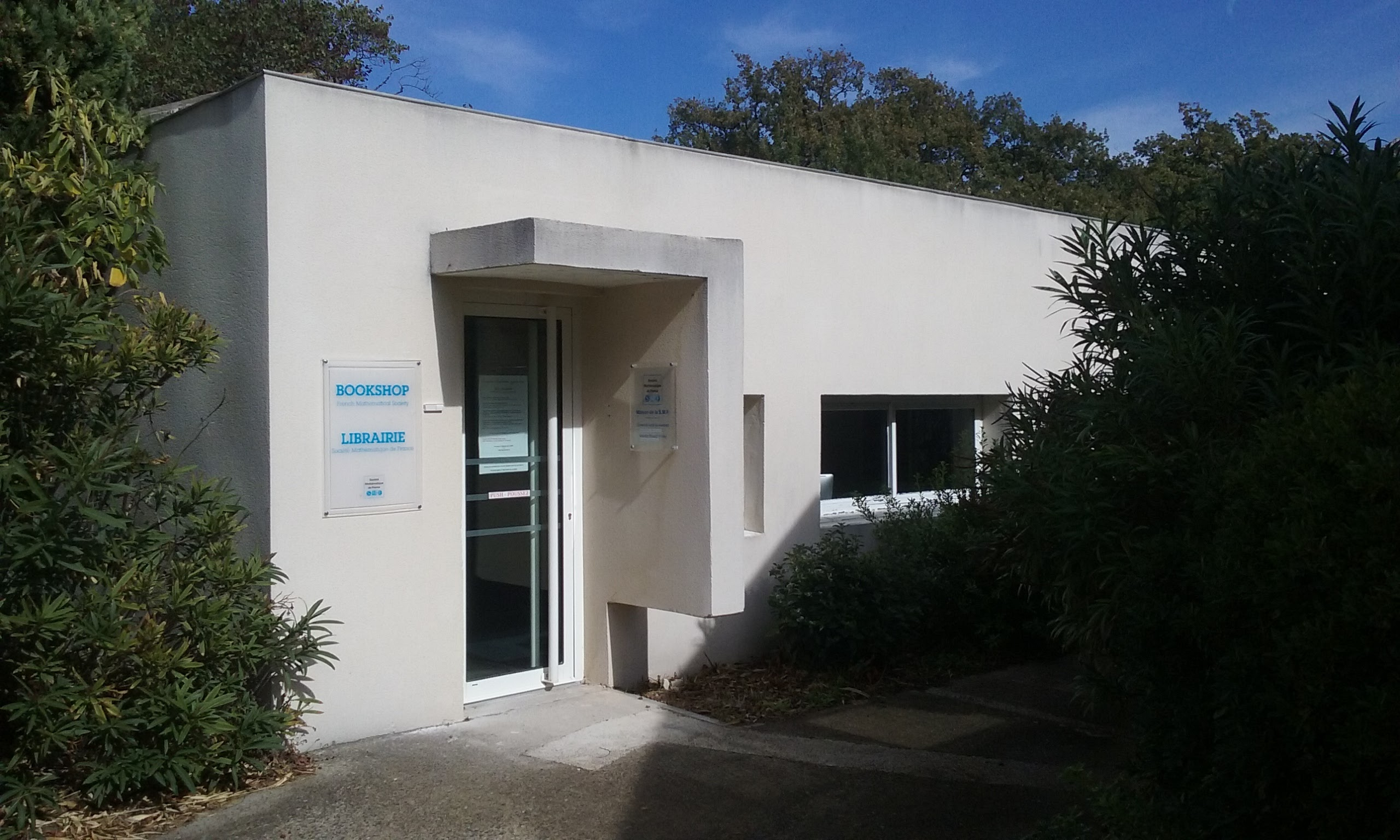
The Maison de la SMF in Luminy, Marseille, France.

The Société mathématique de France (SMF) is the main professional society of French mathematicians.

The society was founded in 1872 by Émile Lemoine and is one of the oldest mathematical societies in existence. It publishes several academic journals: Annales scientifiques de l'École normale supérieure, Astérisque, Bulletin de la Société Mathématique de France, Gazette de la Société mathématique de France, Mémoires de la Société mathématique de France, Panoramas et Synthèses, and Revue d'histoire des mathématiques.

== List of presidents ==
- 1873: Michel Chasles
- 1874: Laffon de Ladebat
- 1875: Irénée-Jules Bienaymé
- 1876: Jules de La Gournerie (1814–1883)
- 1877: Amédée Mannheim
- 1878: Jean Gaston Darboux
- 1879: Pierre Ossian Bonnet
- 1880: Camille Jordan
- 1881: Edmond Laguerre
- 1882: Georges Henri Halphen
- 1883: Eugène Rouché
- 1884: Émile Picard
- 1885: Paul Appell
- 1886: Henri Poincaré
- 1887: Georges Fouret
- 1888: Charles-Ange Laisant
- 1889: Désiré André
- 1890: Julien Haton de La Goupillière
- 1891: Édouard Collignon
- 1892: Eugène Vicaire
- 1893: Georges Humbert
- 1894: Henry Picquet
- 1895: Édouard Goursat
- 1896: Gabriel Koenigs
- 1897: Émile Picard
- 1898: Léon Lecornu
- 1899: Emile Guyou (1843–1915)
- 1900: Henri Poincaré
- 1901: Maurice d’Ocagne
- 1902: Louis Raffy
- 1903: Paul Painlevé
- 1904: Emmanuel Carvallo
- 1905: Émile Borel
- 1906: Jacques Hadamard
- 1907: Emile Blutel
- 1908: Raoul Perrin
- 1909: Charles Bioche
- 1910: Raoul Bricard
- 1911: Lucien Lévy
- 1912: Marie Henri Andoyer
- 1913: François Cosserat
- 1914: Ernest Vessiot
- 1915: Élie Cartan
- 1916: Maurice Fouché
- 1917: Claude Guichard
- 1918: Edmond Maillet
- 1919: Henri Lebesgue
- 1920: Jules Drach
- 1921: Auguste Boulanger
- 1922: Eugène Cahen
- 1923: Paul Appell
- 1924: Paul Lévy
- 1925: Paul Montel
- 1926: Pierre Fatou
- 1927: Bertrand de Defontviolant
- 1928: Alexandre Thybaut
- 1929: André Auric
- 1930: Émile Jouguet
- 1931: Arnaud Denjoy
- 1932: Gaston Julia
- 1933: Alfred-Marie Liénard
- 1934: Jean Chazy
- 1935: Maurice Fréchet
- 1936: René Garnier
- 1937: Joseph Pérès
- 1938: Georges Valiron
- 1939: Henri Vergne
- 1940: ?
- 1941: Théophile Got
- 1942: Charles Platrier
- 1943: Bertrand Gambier
- 1944: Jacques Chapelon
- 1945: Georges Darmois
- 1946: Jean Favard
- 1947: Albert Châtelet
- 1948: Maurice Janet
- 1949: Roger Brard
- 1950: Henri Cartan
- 1951: André Lamothe
- 1952: Marie-Louise Dubreil-Jacotin
- 1953: Szolem Mandelbrojt
- 1954: Jean Leray
- 1955: André Marchaud
- 1956: Maurice Roy
- 1957: André Marchaud
- 1958: Paul Dubreil
- 1959: André Lichnerowicz
- 1960: Marcel Brelot
- 1961: Gustave Choquet
- 1962: Laurent Schwartz
- 1963: Pierre Lelong
- 1964: Jean Dieudonné
- 1965: Charles Ehresmann
- 1966: André Revuz
- 1967: Georges Reeb
- 1968: René Thom
- 1969: Charles Pisot
- 1970: Jean-Pierre Serre
- 1971: Jean Cerf
- 1972–1973: Jean-Pierre Kahane
- 1974: Georges Poitou
- 1975: Yvette Amice
- 1976: Claude Godbillon
- 1977: Jacques Neveu
- 1978: Jean-Louis Koszul
- 1979–1980: Marcel Berger
- 1981: Michel Hervé
- 1982–1983: Christian Houzel
- 1984: Jean-Louis Verdier
- 1985: Bernard Malgrange
- 1986–1987: Jean-François Méla
- 1988: Michel Demazure
- 1989: Gérard Schiffmann
- 1990–1992: Jean-Pierre Bourguignon
- 1992–1994: Daniel Barlet
- 1994–1996: Rémy Langevin
- 1996–1998: Jean-Jacques Risler
- 1998–2001: Mireille Martin-Deschamps
- 2001–2004: Michel Waldschmidt
- 2004–2007: Marie-Françoise Roy
- 2007–2010: Stéphane Jaffard
- 2010–2012: Bernard Helffer
- 2012–2013: Aline Bonami
- 2013–2016: Marc Peigné
- 2016–2019: Stéphane Seuret
- 2020–2024: Fabien Durand
- 2024- : Isabelle Gallagher

== See also ==
- European Mathematical Society
- Centre International de Rencontres Mathématiques
- List of mathematical societies
