= Yvette Amice =

French mathematician (1936–1993)

- Born: 4 June 1936
- Died: 4 July 1993 (aged 57); Passy, Haute-Savoie, France
- Education: University of Paris
- Scientific career
- Fields: Number theory
- Institutions: University of Poitiers; University of Bordeaux; Paris Diderot University
- Thesis: Interpolation $p$-adique (1964)
- Doctoral advisor: Charles Pisot

Yvette Amice (4 June 1936 – 4 July 1993) was a French mathematician who carried out research in the areas of number theory and p-adic analysis. The Amice transform and Amice theorem for p-adic functions are named after her. She headed academic societies and was the second woman president of the Société mathématique de France. In addition to her academic work, she promoted recognition of women mathematicians and their achievements.

== Biography ==
=== Early life and education ===
Born on 4 June 1936, following her father's death from war injuries, she was brought up by her mother, a school teacher, in Indre et Loire.

Amice studied mathematics at the École normale supérieure de jeunes filles in Sèvres, from 1956, earning her agrégation in 1959. She became an assistant at the Faculté des sciences de Paris until 1964, when she completed a state doctorate under the supervision of André Weil and Charles Pisot. Her dissertation was titled p-adic interpolation (French: Interpolation p-adique). (Note: The BNF includes a catalogue entry for Amice's Interpolation p-adique. It was published in Paris by Gauthier-Villars in 1965. Her thesis for Sc. math. in 1964, it was first published in the Bulletin de la Société mathématique de France, T. 92, in 1964.) Her doctoral work addressed p-adic zeta functions and the arithmetic of local fields. Her procedure (now known as Amice theorem) generalized Mahler's theorem.

In 1965, she gave one of the Peccot Lectures (for distinguished mathematicians under 30 years old) at the Collège de France.

=== Career ===
On completing her doctorate, Amice became maître de conférences (lecturer) at the University of Poitiers. In 1966, she was appointed professor at the University of Bordeaux and gave the Cours Peccot lecture series at the Collège de France. She was an advisor to Jean Fresnel (1967) and Daniel Barksy (1974).

Amice returned to Poitiers in 1968, then in 1970 became one of the founding professors of Paris Diderot University, where she was vice president from 1978 to 1981. She was director of a seminar on number theory at the university.

She participated in a number of significant bodies, including the CCU (1968–1976) and the CBESER (1976–1983). She headed the mathematics training and research unit (UFR) at Paris VII (1975.1978), after which she became responsible for all teaching at Paris VII (1978–1981).

In 1975 she became president of the Société mathématique de France. She had been one of three vice-presidents to the society in 1974, and was the only woman on the 25-member council. She was the second woman president of the society, after Marie-Louise Dubreil-Jacotin in 1952. The third woman president, Mireille Martin-Deschamps, did not achieve that role until 1988. As president of the Société mathématique, together with Georges Poitou, she created the Centre International de Rencontres Mathématiques which was founded in Luminy, Marseille, in the early 1980s. Together with Jean Giraud. she was also instrumental in creating the SCFCIEM, the French subcommission of the International Commission on Mathematical Instruction.

Amice died from cancer in Passy, Haute-Savoie, on 4 July 1993, aged 57, following a decade-long illness.

== Advocacy ==
Amice was a supporter of the role of women in science at a time when academic posts were reserved principally for men. She maintained that women scientists and mathematicians should no longer be considered an exception to the general rule. As a result, she actively advocated for the support of women in a number of relevant committees and high-level academic bodies.

== Textbook ==
Amice was the author of a textbook on the p-adic number system, Les nombres p-adiques (Presses Universitaires de France, 1975). Various reviews at the time of release considered it to be a well-written introduction to p-adic analysis covering discussion of p-adic numbers, non-archimedean fields and Banach spaces, analytic functions, and rationality theorems.

== Honours and awards ==
In 1963, Amice was awarded the Albert Châtelet Medal for her works in p-adic analysis.

She was decorated as a knight of the Legion of Honour in January 1991.

In 2026, Amice was announced as one of 72 historical women in STEM whose names have been proposed to be added to the 72 men already celebrated on the Eiffel Tower. The plan was conceived by a student and tour guide named Bernard Rigaud and it was taken up by Sorbonne University's President Nathalie Drach-Temam. and it was announced by the Mayor of Paris, Anne Hidalgo following the recommendations of a committee led by Isabelle Vauglin of Femmes et Sciences and Jean-François Martins, representing the operating company which runs the Eiffel Tower.
