= Cartan's lemma =

In mathematics, Cartan's lemma refers to a number of results named after either Élie Cartan or his son Henri Cartan:

- In exterior algebra: Suppose that v_{1}, ..., v_{p} are linearly independent elements of a vector space V and w_{1}, ..., w_{p} are such that

$$v_1\wedge w_1 + \cdots + v_p\wedge w_p = 0$$

in ΛV. Then there are scalars h_{ij} = h_{ji} such that

$$w_i = \sum_{j=1}^p h_{ij}v_j.$$

- In several complex variables: Let a_{1} < a_{2} < a_{3} < a_{4} and b_{1} < b_{2} and define rectangles in the complex plane C by

$$\begin{align}
K_1 &= \{ z_1=x_1+iy_1 | a_2 < x_1 < a_3, b_1 < y_1 < b_2\} \\
K_1' &= \{ z_1=x_1+iy_1 | a_1 < x_1 < a_3, b_1 < y_1 < b_2\} \\
K_1'' &= \{ z_1=x_1+iy_1 | a_2 < x_1 < a_4, b_1 < y_1 < b_2\}
\end{align}$$

so that $K_1 = K_1'\cap K_1''$. Let K_{2}, ..., K_{n} be simply connected domains in C and let

$$\begin{align}
K &= K_1\times K_2\times\cdots \times K_n\\
K' &= K_1'\times K_2\times\cdots \times K_n\\
K'' &= K_1''\times K_2\times\cdots \times K_n
\end{align}$$

so that again $K = K'\cap K''$. Suppose that F(z) is a complex analytic matrix-valued function on a rectangle K in C^{n} such that F(z) is an invertible matrix for each z in K. Then there exist analytic functions $F'$ in $K'$ and $F''$ in $K''$ such that

$$F(z) = F'(z)F''(z)$$

in K.

- In potential theory, a result that estimates the Hausdorff measure of the set on which a logarithmic Newtonian potential is small. See Cartan's lemma (potential theory).
