= Dolomieu =

- Déodat Gratet de Dolomieu, French geologist.
- Dolomieu, Isère, commune in the Isère department in southeastern France.
