= Peccot Lectures =

Mathematics course at the Collège de France

The Peccot Lecture (Cours Peccot in French) is a semester-long mathematics course given at the Collège de France. Each course is given by a mathematician under 30 years old who has distinguished themselves by their promising work. The course consists in a series of conferences during which the laureate exposes their recent research works.

Being a Peccot lecturer is a distinction that often foresees an exceptional scientific career. Several future recipients of the Fields Medal, Abel Prize, members of the French Academy of Sciences, and professors at the Collège de France are among the laureates. Some of the most illustrious recipients include Émile Borel and the Fields medalists Laurent Schwartz, Jean-Pierre Serre, or Alain Connes.

Some Peccot lectures may additionally be granted – exceptionally and irregularly – the Peccot prize or the Peccot–Vimont prize.

== History ==
The Peccot lectures are among several manifestations organized at the Collège de France which are funded and managed by bequests from the family of Claude-Antoine Peccot, a young mathematician who died while aged 20. Several successive donations to the foundation (in 1886, 1894, and 1897) by Julie Anne Antoinette Peccot and Claudine Henriette Marguerite Lafond (widow Vimont) – respectively the mother and the godmother of Claude-Antoine Peccot – first allowed to create annual stipend, followed by annual lectureship appointments, awarded to mathematicians under 30 who have proved promising. Since 1918, the Peccot lectures have been enlarged to two or three mathematicians each year.

== Laureates ==
=== Laureates of the Peccot lecture and prize who subsequently obtained the Fields medal ===
- Laurent Schwartz: Peccot lecture and prize 1945–1946, Fields medal 1950
- Jean-Pierre Serre: Peccot lecture and prize 1954–1955, Fields medal 1954
- Alexandre Grothendieck: Peccot lecture 1957–1958, Fields medal 1966
- Pierre Deligne: Peccot lecture 1971–1972, Fields medal 1978
- Alain Connes: Peccot lecture and prize 1975–76, Fields medal 1982
- Pierre-Louis Lions: Peccot lecture 1983–1984, Fields medal 1994
- Jean-Christophe Yoccoz: Peccot lecture 1987–1988, Fields medal 1994
- Laurent Lafforgue: Peccot lecture and prize 1995–1996, Fields medal 2002
- Wendelin Werner: Peccot lecture 1998–1999, Fields medal 2006
- Cédric Villani: Peccot lecture and prize 2002–2003, Fields medal 2010
- Artur Avila: Peccot lecture 2004–2005, Fields medal 2014
- Alessio Figalli: Peccot lecture 2011–2012, Fields medal 2018
- Peter Scholze: Peccot lecture and prize 2012–2013, Fields medal 2018
- Hugo Duminil-Copin: Peccot lecture 2014–2015, Fields medal 2022

=== All Peccot lectures ===
Laureates of the Peccot lectures
Year	Name	Title of the lecture
1899–1902	Émile Borel	Three years in a row: Étude des fonctions entières, Étude des séries à termes positifs et des intégrales définies à éléments positifs, Étude des fonctions méromorphes
1902–1903	Henri Lebesgue	Définition de l’intégrale
1903–1904	René Baire	Leçons sur les fonctions discontinues
1904–1905	Henri Lebesgue	Séries trigonométriques
1905–1906	Guillaume Servant	Sur la déformation des surfaces et sur quelques problèmes qui s’y rattachent
1906–1907	Pierre Boutroux	Quelques points de la théorie des équations différentielles
1907–1908	Pierre Boutroux	Sur l’inversion des fonctions entières
1908–1909	Ludovic Zoretti	Les points singuliers des fonctions analytiques
1909–1910	Émile Traynard	Étude des fonctions abéliennes, principales propriétés des surfaces hyperelliptiques
1910–1911	Louis Rémy	Théorie des intégrales doubles et des intégrales de différentielles totales attachées aux surfaces algébriques
1911–1912	Jean Chazy	Leçons sur les équations différentielles à points critiques fixes
1911–1912	Albert Châtelet	Théorie des modules de points
1912–1913	Arnaud Denjoy	Théorie des fonctions entières canoniques d’ordre infini
1913–1914	Maurice Gevrey	Équations aux dérivées partielles du type parabolique, des problèmes aux limites et de la nature des solutions
1913–1914	René Garnier	Équations différentielles dont les intégrales ont leurs points critiques fixes et le problème de Riemann pour les équations linéaires
1914–1915	René Garnier	Systèmes différentiels dont les intégrales ont leurs points critiques fixes
1917–1918	Gaston Julia	Théorie des nombres
1918–1919	Georges Giraud	Sur les fonctions automorphes d’un nombre quelconque de variables
1918–1919	Paul Lévy	Sur les fonctions de lignes et les équations aux dérivées fonctionnelles
1919–1920	Léon Brillouin	Théorie des solides et des liquides en liaison avec la théorie du corps noir
1919–1920	Gaston Julia	Études des points singuliers essentiels isolés des fonctions uniformes
1920–1921	Maurice Janet	Théorie générale des systèmes d’équations aux dérivées partielles
1921–1922	René Thiry	
1922–1923	Torsten Carleman	Les fonctions quasi analytiques
1922–1923	Robert Deltheil	Notions de probabilité élémentaire, les probabilités continues envisagées au point de vue fonctionnel; questions de maximum et de minimum
1923–1924	René Lagrance	Sur le calcul différentiel absolu
1924–1925	Marcel Légaut	Étude géométrique des systèmes de points dans un plan, application à la théorie des courbes gauches algébriques
1925–1926	Henri Milloux	Sur le théorème d'Émile Picard
1927–1928	Joseph Kampé de Fériet	Sur quelques applications des fonctions modulaires à la théorie des fonctions analytiques
1927–1928	Yves Rocard	Progrès récents de la théorie cinétique des gaz et applications
1928–1929	Szolem Mandelbrojt	Quelques recherches modernes dans la théorie des fonctions analytiques
1929–1930	Jean Favard	
1930–1931	Wladimir Bernstein	Résultats acquis sur la distribution des singularités des séries de Dirichlet
1931–1932	Jean Delsarte	Les groupes de transformations linéaires dans l’espace de Hilbert
1932–1933	Henri Cartan	Sur quelques problèmes de la théorie des fonctions analytiques de plusieurs variables complexes
1932–1933	André Weil	Arithmétique sur les variétés algébriques
1933–1934	Jean Dieudonné	Recherches modernes sur les zéros des polynômes
1933–1934	Paul Dubreil	Quelques propriétés générales des variétés algébriques
1934–1935	René de Possel	Sur certaines théories de la mesure et de l’intégrale
1934–1935	Jean Leray	Équations fonctionnelles, théorie générale et applications
1935–1936	Marie-Louise Dubreil-Jacotin	Les ondes de type permanent à deux dimensions dans les fluides incompressibles
1936–1937	Georges Bourion	Série de Taylor à structure lacunaire
1936–1937	Jean-Louis Destouches	Mécanique des systèmes: théorie ondulatoire relativiste
1937–1938	Jacques Solomon	Problèmes récents de la théorie des quanta : neutrons, neutrinos et photons
1937–1938	Claude Chevalley	Théorie des corps et systèmes hypercomplexes
1938–1939	Frédéric Marty	La théorie des hypergroupes et ses applications récentes
1940–1941	Claude Chabauty	Équations diophantiennes
1941–1942	Gérard Pétiau	Études de quelques équations d’ondes corpusculaires
1942–1943	Marie-Antoinette Tonnelat	Les théories unitaires de la lumière et de la gravitation
1942–1943	Jean Ville	La théorie de la corrélation, applications récentes
1943–1944	Jacques Dufresnoy	Sur quelques points de la théorie des fonctions méromorphes
1943–1944	Hubert Delange	Quelques applications d’un principe de la théorie du potentiel
1944–1945	André Lichnerowicz	Sur l’intégration des équations d’Einstein
1945–1946	Jacqueline Ferrand	Problèmes de frontière dans la représentation conforme
1945–1946	Laurent Schwartz	Une extension de la dérivation et de la transformation de Fourier
1946–1947	Gustave Choquet	Propriétés topologiques des fonctions, applications à la géométrie et à l’analyse
1948–1949	Roger Apéry	La géométrie algébrique et les idéaux
1949–1950	Jacques Deny	Problèmes de la théorie du potentiel
1950–1951	Jean-Louis Koszul	La cohomologie des espaces fibrés différentiables
1950–1951	Evry Schatzman	La structure interne des étoiles et des planètes
1951–1952	Roger Godement	Fonctions sphériques et groupes de Lie semi–simples
1951–1952	Michel Hervé	Problèmes particuliers sur les fonctions de deux variables complexes, itération, fonctions automorphes
1952–1953	Jean Combes	Fonctions analytiques sur une surface de Riemann
1953–1954	Yvonne Fourès-Bruhat	Le problème de Cauchy pour les systèmes d’équations hyperboliques du second ordre non linéaires
1954–1955	Jean-Pierre Serre	Cohomologie et géométrie algébrique
1955–1956	Maurice Roseau	Les fonctions pseudo-analytiques, application à la mécanique des fluides
1955–1956	Paul Malliavin	Analyse harmonique d’un opérateur différentiel
1956–1957	Jean-Pierre Kahane	Sur quelques problèmes d’analyse harmonique
1957–1958	Marcel Berger	Espaces symétriques affines
1957–1958	Alexandre Grothendieck	Classes de Chern et théorème de Riemann-Roch pour les faisceaux algébriques cohérents
1958–1959	Jacques-Louis Lions	Équations différentielles opérationnelles
1958–1959	Bernard Malgrange	Sur les fonctions moyenne-périodiques de plusieurs variables
1959–1960	François Bruhat	Distributions et représentations des groupes
1960–1961	Pierre Cartier	Cohomologie galoisienne et diviseurs sur une variété algébrique
1961–1962	Jacques Neveu	Théorie unifiée des processus de Markov sur un espace dénombrable d’états
1962–1963	Jean-Paul Benzécri	Statistique et structure des langues naturelles, essai de synthèse mathématique
1962–1963	Philippe Nozières	Application de la théorie des champs à l’étude des liquides de Fermi et de Bose au zéro absolu
1963–1964	Paul-André Meyer	Théorie des surmartingales
1964–1965	Pierre Gabriel	Fondements de la topologie simpliciale
1964–1965	Marcel Froissart	Théorème asymptotiques en théorie des particules élémentaires
1965–1966	Yvette Amice	Analyse p-adique
1966–1967	Jean Ginibre	Sur le problème de la limite thermodynamique en mécanique statistique
1966–1967	Michel Demazure	Algèbres de Lie filtrées
1967–1968	Uriel Frisch	Les fonctions parastochastiques
1967–1968	Pierre Grisvard	Sur quelques types d’équations opérationnelles, applications à certains problèmes aux limites en équations aux dérivées partielles
1968–1969	Michel Raynaud	Variétés abéliennes sur un corps local
1968–1969	Claude Morlet	Automorphismes et plongements de variétés
1968–1969	Yves Meyer	Nombres de Pisot et nombres de Salem en analyse harmonique
1969–1970	Roger Temam	Quelques nouvelles méthodes de résolution d’équations aux dérivées partielles linéaires et non linéaires
1969–1970	Gabriel Mokobodzki	Quelques structures algébriques de la théorie du potentiel
1970–1971	Jean-Pierre Ferrier	Application à l’analyse complexe du calcul symbolique de Waelbroeck
1970–1971	Hervé Jacquet	Fonctions automorphes et produits eulériens
1970–1971	Gérard Schiffmann	Théorie de Hecke d’après Jacquet-Langlands
1971–1972	Pierre Deligne	Les immeubles des groupes de tresses généralisés
1971–1972	Louis Boutet de Monvel	Problèmes aux limites pour les opérateurs pseudo-différentiels et étude de l’analyticité
1972–1973	François Laudenbach	Topologie de la dimension 3 : homotopie et isotopie
1972–1973	Jean-Michel Bony	Hyperfonctions et équations aux dérivées partielles
1973–1974	Haïm Brézis	Les semi–groupes de contractions non linéaires
1973–1974	Michel Duflo	La formule de Plancherel pour les groupes de Lie résolubles exponentiels
1973–1974	Jean Zinn–Justin	Étude des théories de jauge au moyen de méthodes fonctionnelles
1974–1975	Robert Roussarie	Modèles locaux de formes différentielles et de champs de vecteurs
1974–1975	Jean-Marc Fontaine	Groupes p-divisibles sur les corps locaux
1974–1975	André Neveu	Modèles duaux de résonances pour les interactions fortes
1975–1976	Alain Connes	Sur la classification des algèbres de von Neumann et de leurs automorphismes
1975–1976	Bernard Teissier	Sur la géométrie des singularités analytiques
1976–1977	Luc Tartar	Problèmes d’homogénéisation dans les équations aux dérivées partielles
1976–1977	Michel Waldschmidt	Nombres transcendants et groupes algébriques
1977–1978	Jean Lannes	Formes quadratiques et variétés
1977–1978	Arnaud Beauville	Surfaces de type général
1978–1979	Bernard Gaveau	Problèmes non linéaires en analyse complexe
1978–1979	Grégory Choodnovsky	Diophantine analysis problems in transcendence theory and applications
1979–1980	Gilles Robert	Unités elliptiques et séries d’Eisentein
1980–1981	Michel Talagrand	Compacts de fonctions mesurables et applications
1980–1981	Gilles Pisier	Séries de Fourier aléatoires, processus gaussiens et applications à l’analyse harmonique
1980–1981	Christophe Soulé	K–théorie et valeurs de fonctions zêta
1981–1982	Jean-Luc Brylinski	Systèmes différentiels et groupes algébriques
1981–1982	Jean–Bernard Baillon	Quelques applications de la géométrie des espaces de Banach à l’analyse fonctionnelle
1982–1983	Jean-Loup Waldspurger	Valeurs de certaines fonctions L-automorphes en leur centre de symétrie
1983–1984	Pierre-Louis Lions	Méthode de concentration-compacité en calcul des variations
1983–1984	Guy Henniart	Sur les conjectures de Langlands
1983–1984	Laurent Clozel	Changement de base pour les formes automorphes sur le groupe linéaire
1984–1985	Joseph Oesterlé	Démonstration de la conjecture de Bieberbach d’après Louis de Branges
1985–1986	Jean-Pierre Demailly	Critères géométriques d’algébricité pour les variétés analytiques complexes
1987–1988	Jean-Lin Journé	Opérateur d’intégrales singulières et applications
1987–1988	Jean-Claude Sikorav	Questions de géométrie symplectique
1988–1989	Bernard Larrouturou	Problèmes non linéaires en théorie de la combustion : modélisation, analyse et résolution numérique
1989–1990	Jean-Benoît Bost	Principe d’Oka et K–théorie des algèbres de Banach non commutatives
1989–1990	Jean-François Le Gall	Quelques propriétés du mouvement brownien et de ses points multiples, applications à l’analyse et à la physique
1989–1990	Benoît Perthame	Quelques équations cinétiques et leurs limites fluides
1990–1991	Claude Viterbo	Systèmes hamiltoniens, topologie symplectique et fonctions génératrices
1990–1991	Olivier Mathieu	Techniques de caractéristique finie appliquées aux représentations en caractéristique zéro
1991–1992	Fabrice Bethuel	EDP non linéaires en théorie des cristaux liquides et en géométrie
1991–1992	Noam Elkies	Elliptic surfaces and lattices
1991–1992	Claire Voisin	Variations de structure de Hodge et cycles algébriques des hypersurfaces
1992–1993	François Golse	Limites hydrodynamiques de modèles cinétiques
1993–1994	Ricardo Perez-Marco	
1993–1994	Marc Rosso	Points fixes indifférents et difféomorphismes analytiques du cercle
1994–1995	Loïc Merel	L’arithmétique des jacobiennes de courbes modulaires
1994–1995	Eric Séré	Problèmes variationnels non compacts et systèmes hamiltoniens
1995–1996	Laurent Lafforgue	Chtoucas de Drinfeld et conjecture de Ramanujan-Petersson
1996–1997	Christophe Breuil	Cohomologie log-cristalline et cohomologie étale de torsion
1996–1997	Christine Lescop	Autour de l’invariant de Casson
1997–1998	Andrei Moroianu	Géométrie spinorielle et groupes d’holonomie
1998–1999	Philippe Michel	Sur les zéros des fonctions L des formes modulaires, méthodes analytiques, exposants d’intersection
1998–1999	Wendelin Werner	Invariance conforme et mouvement brownien plan
1999–2000	Emmanuel Grenier	Quelques problèmes de stabilité en mécanique des fluides
1999–2000	Raphaël Rouquier	Catégories de représentations modulaires de groupes finis: approches géométriques
2000–2001	Vincent Lafforgue	K–théorie bivariante pour les algèbres de Banach et conjecture de Baum–Connes, dynamique des homéomorphismes de surfaces
2000–2001	Frédéric Le Roux	Versions topologiques du théorème de la fleur de Leau et du théorème de la variété stable
2001–2002	Denis Auroux	Techniques approximativement holomorphes et invariants des variétés symplectiques
2001–2002	Thierry Bodineau	Quelques aspects mathématiques de la coexistence de phases
2002–2003	Franck Barthe	Extensions du théorème de Brunn-Minkowski, conséquences géométriques et entropiques
2002–2003	Cédric Villani	Propriétés qualitatives des solutions de l’équation de Boltzmann
2003–2004	Laurent Fargues	Cohomologie des espaces de modules de groupes p-divisibles et correspondances de Langlands locales
2003–2004	Laure Saint-Raymond	Méthodes mathématiques pour l’étude des limites hydrodynamiques
2004–2005	Artur Avila	Dynamique des cocycles quasi périodiques et spectres de l’opérateur presque-Mathieu
2004–2005	Stefaan Vaes	Coactions de groupes quantiques et facteurs de type III
2005–2006	Laurent Berger	Représentations galoisiennes et analyse p-adique
2005–2006	Emmanuel Breuillard	Propriétés qualitatives des groupes discrets
2006–2007	Erwan Rousseau	Hyperbolicité des variétés complexes
2006–2007	Jérémie Szeftel	Problèmes mathématiques autour de la conjecture de courbure L2 pour les équations d’Einstein
2007–2008	Karine Beauchard	Contrôle d’équations de Schrödinger
2007–2008	Gaëtan Chenevier	Variétés de Hecke des groupes unitaires et représentations galoisiennes
2008–2009	Joseph Ayoub	Motifs, réalisations et groupes de Galois motiviques
2008–2009	Julien Dubedat	Systèmes invariants conformes: chemins et champs
2009–2010	Antoine Touzé	Invariants, cohomologie et représentations fonctorielles des groupes algébriques
2010–2011	Sylvain Arlot	Sélection de modèles et sélection d’estimateurs pour l’apprentissage statistique
2010–2011	Anne–Laure Dalibard	Quelques problèmes de couches limites en mécanique des fluides
2011–2012	Alessio Figalli	Stabilité dans les inégalités fonctionnelles, transport optimal et EDP
2011–2012	Vincent Pilloni	Variété de Hecke et cohomologie cohérente
2012–2013	Valentin Feray	Approche duale des représentations du groupe symétrique
2012–2013	Christophe Garban	Autour de la percolation presque-critique et de l’arbre couvrant minimal dans le plan
2012–2013	Peter Scholze	A p-adic analogue of Riemann’s classification of complex abelian varieties
2013–2014	François Charles	Quelques progrès récents sur la géométrie arithmétique des surfaces
2013–2014	Nicolas Rougerie	Théorèmes de de Finetti, limites de champ moyen et condensation de Bose–Einstein
2014–2015	Hugo Duminil-Copin	Geometric representations of low dimensional spin systems
2014–2015	Gabriel Dospinescu	Autour de la correspondance de Langlands locale p-adique pour $\mathrm{GL}_2({\mathbf Q}_p)$
2015–2016	Nicolas Curien	Épluchage des cartes planaires aléatoires
2016–2017	Marco Robalo	Géométrie algébrique dérivée et les invariants de Gromov-Witten
2016–2017	Raphael Beuzart-Plessis	Factorisations de périodes et formules de Plancherel
2016–2017	Olivier Taïbi	Motifs sur Q de conducteur 1 du point de vue automorphe
2017–2018	Yannick Bonthonneau	Analyse microlocale semi–classique sur des variétés à pointes
2017–2018	Camille Horbez	Géométrie asymptotique du groupe des automorphismes extérieurs d'un groupe libre
2018–2019	Jacek Jendrej	Théorème du seuil et bulles en interaction pour l'équation wave maps critique
2019–2020	Najib Idrissi	Homotopie réelle des espaces de configuration
2019–2020	Thomas Leblé	Aspects microscopiques des systèmes à interaction logarithmique
2019–2020	Irène Waldspurger	Optimisation non convexe pour la reconstruction de matrices de rang faible

== See also ==
- List of mathematics awards
