= Cartan decomposition =

Generalized matrix decomposition for Lie groups and Lie algebras

In mathematics, the Cartan decomposition is a decomposition of a semisimple Lie group or Lie algebra, which plays an important role in their structure theory and representation theory. It generalizes the polar decomposition or singular value decomposition of matrices. Its history can be traced to the 1880s work of Élie Cartan and Wilhelm Killing.

== Cartan involutions on Lie algebras ==
Let $\mathfrak{g}$ be a real semisimple Lie algebra and let $B(\cdot,\cdot)$ be its Killing form. An involution on $\mathfrak{g}$ is a Lie algebra automorphism $\theta$ of $\mathfrak{g}$ whose square is equal to the identity. Such an involution is called a Cartan involution on $\mathfrak{g}$ if $B_\theta(X,Y) := -B(X,\theta Y)$ is a positive definite bilinear form.

Two involutions $\theta_1$ and $\theta_2$ are considered equivalent if they differ only by an inner automorphism.

Any real semisimple Lie algebra has a Cartan involution, and any two Cartan involutions are equivalent.

=== Examples ===
- A Cartan involution on $\mathfrak{sl}_n(\mathbb{R})$ is defined by $\theta(X)=-X^T$, where $X^T$ denotes the transpose matrix of $X$.
- The identity map on $\mathfrak{g}$ is an involution. It is the unique Cartan involution of $\mathfrak{g}$ if and only if the Killing form of $\mathfrak{g}$ is negative definite or, equivalently, if and only if $\mathfrak{g}$ is the Lie algebra of a compact semisimple Lie group.
- Let $\mathfrak{g}$ be the complexification of a real semisimple Lie algebra $\mathfrak{g}_0$, then complex conjugation on $\mathfrak{g}$ is an involution on $\mathfrak{g}$. This is the Cartan involution on $\mathfrak{g}$ if and only if $\mathfrak{g}_0$ is the Lie algebra of a compact Lie group.
- The following maps are involutions of the Lie algebra $\mathfrak{su}(n)$ of the special unitary group SU(n):
  1. The identity involution $\theta_1(X) = X$, which is the unique Cartan involution in this case.
  2. Complex conjugation, expressible as $\theta_2 (X) = - X^T$ on $\mathfrak{su}(2)$.
  3. If $n = p+q$ is odd,
    $$\theta_3 (X) = \begin{pmatrix} I_p & 0 \\ 0 & -I_q \end{pmatrix} X \begin{pmatrix} I_p & 0 \\ 0 & -I_q \end{pmatrix}$$
    . The involutions (1), (2) and (3) are equivalent, but not equivalent to the identity involution since
    $$\begin{pmatrix} I_p & 0 \\ 0 & -I_q \end{pmatrix} \notin \mathfrak {{su}}(n)$$.
  4. If $n = 2m$ is even, there is also
    $$\theta_4 (X) = \begin{pmatrix} 0 & I_m \\ -I_m & 0 \end{pmatrix} X^T \begin{pmatrix} 0 & I_m \\ -I_m & 0 \end{pmatrix}$$.

== Cartan pairs ==
Let $\theta$ be an involution on a Lie algebra $\mathfrak{g}$. Since $\theta^2=1$, the linear map $\theta$ has the two eigenvalues $\pm1$. If $\mathfrak{k}$ and $\mathfrak{p}$ denote the eigenspaces corresponding to +1 and -1, respectively, then $\mathfrak{g} = \mathfrak{k}\oplus\mathfrak{p}$. Since $\theta$ is a Lie algebra automorphism, the Lie bracket of two of its eigenspaces is contained in the eigenspace corresponding to the product of their eigenvalues. It follows that

$[\mathfrak{k}, \mathfrak{k}] \subseteq \mathfrak{k}$, $[\mathfrak{k}, \mathfrak{p}] \subseteq \mathfrak{p}$, and $[\mathfrak{p}, \mathfrak{p}] \subseteq \mathfrak{k}$.

Thus $\mathfrak{k}$ is a Lie subalgebra, while any subalgebra of $\mathfrak{p}$ is commutative.

Conversely, a decomposition $\mathfrak{g} = \mathfrak{k}\oplus\mathfrak{p}$ with these extra properties determines an involution $\theta$ on $\mathfrak{g}$ that is $+1$ on $\mathfrak{k}$ and $-1$ on $\mathfrak{p}$.

Such a pair $(\mathfrak{k}, \mathfrak{p})$ is also called a Cartan pair of $\mathfrak{g}$, and $(\mathfrak{g},\mathfrak{k})$ is called a symmetric pair. This notion of a Cartan pair here is not to be confused with the distinct notion involving the relative Lie algebra cohomology $H^*(\mathfrak{g},\mathfrak{k})$.

The decomposition $\mathfrak{g} = \mathfrak{k}\oplus\mathfrak{p}$ associated to a Cartan involution is called a Cartan decomposition of $\mathfrak{g}$. The special feature of a Cartan decomposition is that the Killing form is negative definite on $\mathfrak{k}$ and positive definite on $\mathfrak{p}$. Furthermore, $\mathfrak{k}$ and $\mathfrak{p}$ are orthogonal complements of each other with respect to the Killing form on $\mathfrak{g}$.

== Cartan decomposition on the Lie group level ==
Let $G$ be a non-compact semisimple Lie group and $\mathfrak{g}$ its Lie algebra. Let $\theta$ be a Cartan involution on $\mathfrak{g}$ and let $(\mathfrak{k},\mathfrak{p})$ be the resulting Cartan pair. Let $K$ be the analytic subgroup of $G$ with Lie algebra $\mathfrak{k}$. Then:

- There is a Lie group automorphism $\Theta$ with differential $\theta$ at the identity that satisfies $\Theta^2=1$.
- The subgroup of elements fixed by $\Theta$ is $K$; in particular, $K$ is a closed subgroup.
- The mapping $K\times\mathfrak{p} \rightarrow G$ given by $(k,X) \mapsto k\cdot \mathrm{exp}(X)$ is a diffeomorphism.
- The subgroup $K$ is a maximal compact subgroup of $G$, whenever the center of G is finite.

The automorphism $\Theta$ is also called the global Cartan involution, and the diffeomorphism $K\times\mathfrak{p} \rightarrow G$ is called the global Cartan decomposition. If we write $P=\mathrm{exp}(\mathfrak{p})\subset G$ this says that the product map $K\times P \rightarrow G$ is a diffeomorphism so $G=KP$.

For the general linear group, $X \mapsto (X^{-1})^T$ is a Cartan involution.

A refinement of the Cartan decomposition for symmetric spaces of compact or noncompact type states that the maximal Abelian subalgebras $\mathfrak{a}$ in $\mathfrak{p}$ are unique up to conjugation by $K$. Moreover,

$$\displaystyle{\mathfrak{p}= \bigcup_{k\in K} \mathrm{Ad}\, k \cdot \mathfrak{a}}
\qquad\text{and}\qquad
\displaystyle{P= \bigcup_{k\in K} \mathrm{Ad}\, k \cdot A}$$

where $A = e^\mathfrak{a}$.

In the compact and noncompact case the global Cartan decomposition thus implies

$$G = KP = KAK,$$

Geometrically the image of the subgroup $A$ in $G/K$ is a totally geodesic submanifold.

== Relation to polar decomposition ==
Consider $\mathfrak{gl}_n(\mathbb{R})$ with the Cartan involution $\theta(X)=-X^T$. Then $\mathfrak{k}=\mathfrak{so}_n(\mathbb{R})$ is the real Lie algebra of skew-symmetric matrices, so that $K=\mathrm{SO}(n)$, while $\mathfrak{p}$ is the subspace of symmetric matrices. Thus the exponential map is a diffeomorphism from $\mathfrak{p}$ onto the space of positive definite matrices. Up to this exponential map, the global Cartan decomposition is the polar decomposition of a matrix. The polar decomposition of an invertible matrix is unique.

== See also ==
- Lie group decompositions
