= Cartan's theorem =

Cartan's theorem may refer to several mathematical results by Élie Cartan:

- Closed-subgroup theorem, 1930, that any closed subgroup of a Lie group is a Lie subgroup
- Theorem of the highest weight, that the irreducible representations of Lie algebras or Lie groups are classified by their highest weights
- Lie's third theorem, an equivalence between Lie algebras and simply-connected Lie groups

== See also ==
- Cartan's theorems A and B, c.1931 results by Henri Cartan concerning a coherent sheaf on a Stein manifold
- Cartan's lemma, several results by Élie or Henri Cartan
- Cartan–Dieudonné theorem, a result on orthogonal transformations and reflections
