= Mohsen Hashtroodi =

Iranian mathematician (1907–1976)

- محسن هشترودی
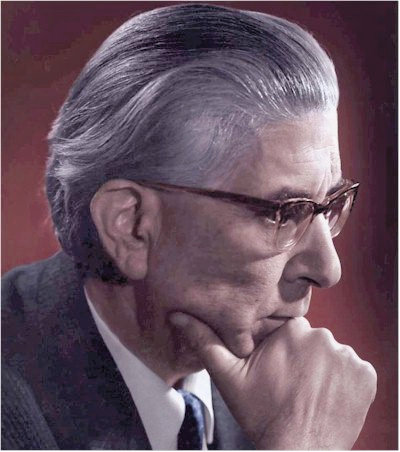
- Born: 12 January 1907; Tabriz, Iran
- Died: 4 September 1976 (aged 69); Tehran, Iran
- Education: University of Paris (Sorbonne)
- Known for: Hachtroudi connection
- Scientific career
- Fields: Differential geometry
- Workplaces: University of Tehran; University of Tabriz; Institute for Advanced Study
- Doctoral advisor: Élie Cartan

Mohsen Hashtroodi (محسن هشترودی; also transliterated Hachtroudi or Hashtroudi) was an Iranian mathematician, public intellectual, and popular lecturer. A student of Élie Cartan, he worked in differential geometry; his doctoral work led to what is now called the Hachtroudi connection.

== Life ==
Hashtroodi was born in Tabriz on 12 January 1907, received his primary education there, and moved to Tehran where he completed secondary school at the Dār al-Fonūn in 1925. He subsequently went to France on a government scholarship to study mathematics at the Sorbonne, earning a licence (1935) and a doctorat d’État (1937) under Élie Cartan. His thesis, Les espaces d’éléments à connexion projective normale, was published by Hermann (Actualités scientifiques et industrielles, no. 505) and is available online.

Back in Iran he taught at Dānešsarā-ye ʿāli and the University of Tehran (professor, 1941). He later served as president of the University of Tabriz (1951) and as dean of science at the University of Tehran (1957).

He was a member at the Institute for Advanced Study (School of Mathematics), Princeton, in October–December 1951. He attended several International Congresses of Mathematicians, including 1950 (Cambridge, Massachusetts), 1954 (Amsterdam), and 1958 (Edinburgh).

Hashtroodi married Robāb Modiri in 1944; they had three children (Faranak, Faribā, and Ramin). He died in Tehran on 4 September 1976 and is buried at Behesht-e Zahra cemetery, Tehran.

== Selected works ==
- Les espaces d’éléments à connexion projective normale (Paris: Hermann, 1937).
- Les espaces normaux (Tehran, 1945).
- Les connexions normales, affines et weyliennes (Tehran, 1948).
- Sur les espaces de Riemann, de Weyl et de Schouten (Tehran, 1956).

== Legacy ==
The Iranian Mathematical Society awards the Hashtroudi Award in geometry and topology in his honour.
