= French mathematical seminars =

French mathematical seminars have been an important type of institution combining research and exposition, active since the beginning of the twentieth century.

From 1909 to 1937, the Séminaire Hadamard gathered many participants (f. i. André Weil) around the presentation of international research papers and work in progress. The Séminaire Julia focussed on yearly themes and impulsed the Bourbaki movement. The Séminaire Nicolas Bourbaki is the most famous, but is atypical in a number of ways: it attempts to cover, if selectively, the whole of pure mathematics, and its talks are now, by convention, reports and surveys on research by someone not directly involved. More standard is a working group organised around a specialist area, with research talks given and written up "from the horse's mouth".

Historically speaking, the Séminaire Cartan of the late 1940s and early 1950s, around Henri Cartan, was one of the most influential. Publication in those days was by means of the duplicated exemplaire (limited distribution and not peer-reviewed). The seminar model was tested, almost to destruction, by the SGA series of Alexander Grothendieck.

== Notable seminars ==
- Séminaire Bourbaki, still current, general; Nicolas Bourbaki
- Séminaire Brelot-Choquet-Deny (from 1957), potential theory; Marcel Brelot, Gustave Choquet, Jacques Deny
- Séminaire Cartan, homological algebra, sheaf theory, several complex variables; Henri Cartan and his students
- Séminaire Châtelet-Dubreil, Dubreil, Dubreil-Pisot, from 1951, abstract algebra
- Séminaire Chevalley, algebraic geometry, late 1950s
- Séminaire Delange-Pisot, then Delange-Pisot-Poitou, from 1959, number theory
- Séminaire Ehresmann, differential geometry and category theory; Charles Ehresmann
- Séminaire Grothendieck, from 1957, became Grothendieck's Séminaire de Géométrie Algébrique
- Séminaire Janet, differential equations
- Séminaire Kahane
- Séminaire Lelong, several complex variables
- Séminaire Schwartz, functional analysis; Laurent Schwartz

== See also ==
- Colloquium
- Congress
- Convention (meeting)
- Scientific journal
- Seminar
- Plenary session
- Poster session
- Professional conference
- Symposium (academic)
- Webinar (a seminar attended through the internet)
