= Cartan–Eilenberg resolution =

In homological algebra, the Cartan–Eilenberg resolution is in a sense, a resolution of a chain complex. It can be used to construct hyper-derived functors. It is named in honor of Henri Cartan and Samuel Eilenberg.

== Definition ==
Let $\mathcal{A}$ be an Abelian category with enough projectives, and let $A_{*}$ be a chain complex with objects in $\mathcal{A}$. Then a Cartan–Eilenberg resolution of $A_{*}$ is an upper half-plane double complex $P_{*,*}$ (i.e., $P_{p,q} = 0$ for $q < 0$) consisting of projective objects of $\mathcal{A}$ and an "augmentation" chain map $\varepsilon \colon P_{p,*} \to A_p$ such that

- If $A_{p} = 0$ then the p-th column is zero, i.e. $P_{p, q} = 0$ for all q.
- For any fixed column $P_{p, *}$,
  - The complex of boundaries $B_p(P, d^h) := d^h(P_{p+1. *})$ obtained by applying the horizontal differential to $P_{p+1, *}$ (the $p+1$st column of $P_{*,*}$) forms a projective resolution $B_p(\varepsilon): B_p(P, d^h) \to B_p(A)$ of the boundaries of $A_p$.
  - The complex $H_p(P, d^h)$ obtained by taking the homology of each row with respect to the horizontal differential forms a projective resolution $H_p(\varepsilon): H_p(P, d^h) \to H_p(A)$ of degree p homology of $A$.

It can be shown that for each p, the column $P_{p, *}$ is a projective resolution of $A_{p}$.

There is an analogous definition using injective resolutions and cochain complexes.

The existence of Cartan–Eilenberg resolutions can be proved via the horseshoe lemma.

=== Hyper-derived functors ===
Given a right exact functor $F \colon \mathcal{A} \to \mathcal{B}$, one can define the left hyper-derived functors of $F$ on a chain complex $A_{*}$ by

- Constructing a Cartan–Eilenberg resolution $\varepsilon: P_{*, *} \to A_{*}$,
- Applying the functor $F$ to $P_{*, *}$, and
- Taking the homology of the resulting total complex.

Similarly, one can also define right hyper-derived functors for left exact functors.

== See also ==
- Hyperhomology
