= Marie-Antoinette Tonnelat =

French physicist (1912–1980)

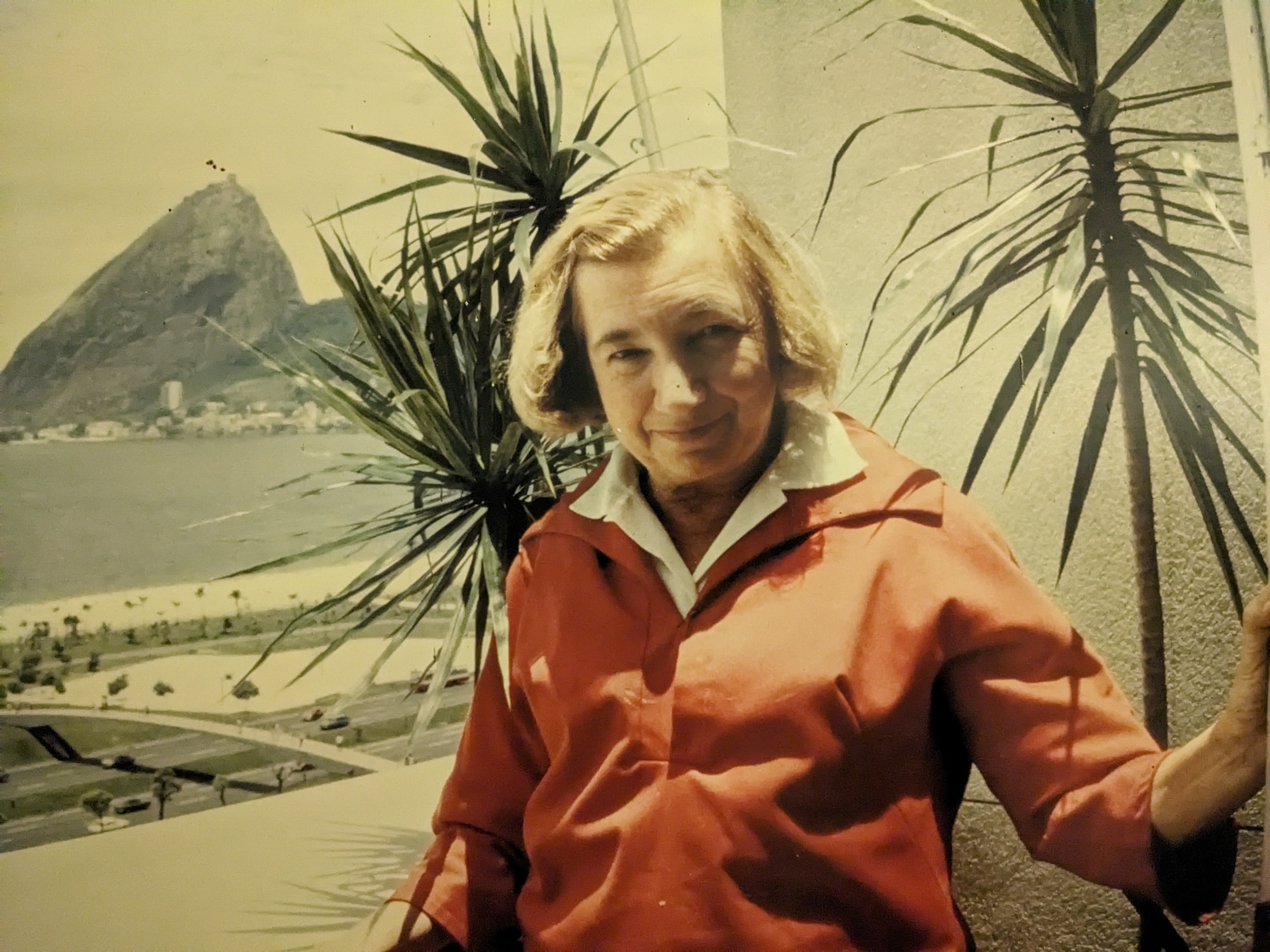
- circa 1978
- Born: Marie-Antoinette Baudot; March 5, 1912; Charolles, France
- Died: December 3, 1980 (aged 68); Paris, France
- Education: Institut Henri Poincaré
- Spouse: Jacques Tonnelat
- Awards: Peccot Lectures (1943); Prix d'Académie (1972)
- Scientific career
- Fields: Theoretical physics Relativistic quantum mechanics Theory of relativity History of physics
- Workplaces: CNRS; Université de Paris
- Thesis: Sur la théorie du photon dans un espace de Riemann (1941)
- Doctoral advisor: Louis de Broglie

Signature
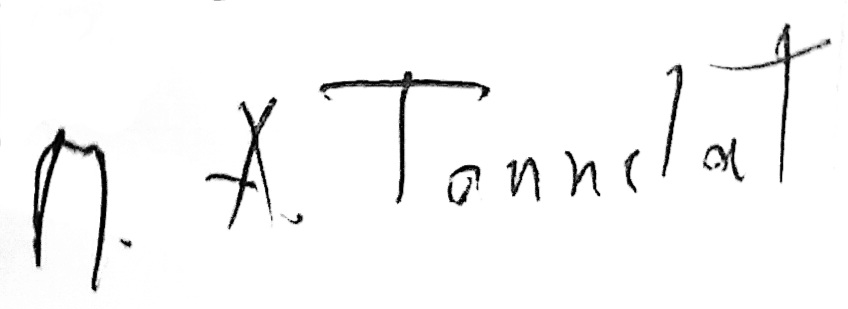

Marie-Antoinette Tonnelat, née Baudot (French: [maʁi ɑ̃twanɛt tɔnla]; March 5, 1912 – December 3, 1980), was a French theoretical physicist. Her physics research focused on relativistic quantum mechanics under the influence of gravity. With the help of Albert Einstein and Erwin Schrödinger, she attempted to propose one of the first unified field theories. She is also known for her work on the history of special and general relativity.

== Early years and education ==
Marie-Antoinette Baudot was born on March 5, 1912, in Charolles, a commune in the Southern Burgundy region of France. She began her education at the Lycée de Chalon-sur-Saône and finished her secondary education at Lycée Louis-le-Grand. She studied Thomism at the Institut catholique de Paris for her bachelor’s degree in philosophy. She also earned a degree in the sciences at the University of Sorbonne in Paris.

In 1935, Tonnelat pursued a doctorate in theoretical physics under physicist Louis de Broglie at the Institut Henri Poincaré. In 1941, she finished her doctoral thesis titled On the Theory of the Photon in a Riemannian space. The same year she married fellow physicist Jacques Tonnelat and took his surname, becoming known as Marie-Antoinette Tonnelat. In 1945 she became a researcher at the French National Center for Scientific Research (CNRS).

== Research with de Broglie ==
Tonnelat's research focused on the field of relativistic spin-particles under the influence of a gravitational field. With de Broglie's neutrino theory of light, Tonnelat arrived at particles with maximal spin 2 from massive spin 1 particles, or photons. Spin 2 corresponded to the graviton. With her knowledge of the Klein-Gordon equation, Maxwell's equations, and the linearised version of the equation for Einstein spaces, she examined the theory for a particle with spin 2 and called it "a unitary formalism". She published a paper in the early 1940s in which she established the standard commutation relations for the quantized spin-2 field. De Broglie supported her research in unified field theory, but he himself stayed away from it and chose not to be directly involved with her studies.

Although her papers were eventually published at the French Academy of Sciences, her work was subject to delays due to World War II and the German occupation of France in the early 1940s.

== Professional career ==
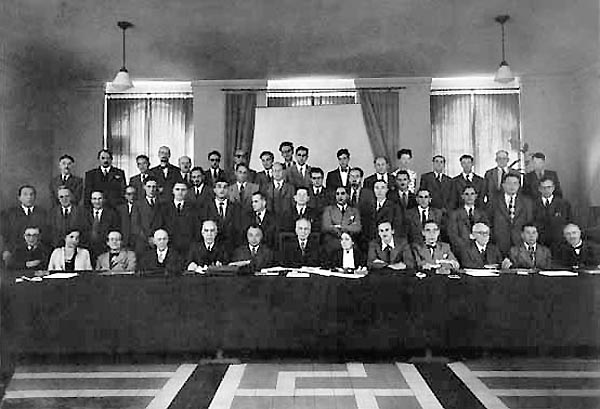
The 1948 Solvay Conference. The front row, left to right begins: John Cockcroft, Marie-Antoinette Tonnelat and Erwin Schrödinger. The other woman present is Lise Meitner

Tonnelat spent much of her career as an educator. After the war, Tonnelat spent some time at the Dublin Institute for Advanced Studies with scientist Erwin Schrödinger to focus on furthering the earlier research she had done under de Broglie's supervision. She began to examine the concept of unitary formalism that comes from emerging spin-2 particles. Her time with Schrödinger inspired her interest in the relativity theory and sparked her correspondence with Albert Einstein as well. Her goal was to create one unified theory using the concepts and ideas discovered by Einstein and Schrödinger.

In 1953, just prior to Einstein's death, Marie-Antoinette Tonnelat was invited to Princeton University. She spoke about the topic at the International Congress for the History of Science in Jerusalem. She gave many lectures throughout her career about her work related to the theory of relativity.

In 1956, she became a chaired professor of physical theories at the Faculty of Science at the University of Paris. In parallel, from 1949, she delivered a lecture series on the history of physical theories at the l'Institut d'Histoire des Sciences at the University of Paris (directed by Gaston Bachelard) for twenty years, having earned a diploma in the subject there.

In 1965, she published a second book on unified field theories that focused on the development of research in the field. Only one chapter referred to her own research relating to Einstein and Schrödinger, but the book contained a few references to the doctoral theses that she had been the adviser for. Tonnelat's work was mainly concerned with establishing a connection between classic and quantum field theory. She introduced an alternative theory of gravitation (linear gravity), which she had studied in 1960.

In the 1960s, Tonnelat was a nominator for the Nobel Prize in Physics. She proposed Louis Néel in 1960 and Alfred Kastler in 1965.

In 1980, Marie-Antoinette Tonnelat's deteriorating health made it difficult for her to continue giving her lectures. She died on 3 December 1980, shortly after giving her last lecture.

She left an unpublished work about the history of theories of light and colour.

== Personal life ==
In 1941, Marie-Antoinette Baudot married physicist Jacques Tonnelat. The couple had three children.

== Honours and awards ==
Tonnelat became a Peccot Lecturer and Laureate of the Collège de France in 1943. Her talk was entitled "Unitary theories of light and gravitation" (French: Les théories unitaires de la lumière et de la gravitation). She was awarded the Pierson–Perrin Prize (1946) and the Henri Poincaré Award (1971) by French Academy of Sciences.

Tonnelat received the Prix d'Académie of the Académie Française in 1972 for her book History of the Principle of Relativity (French: Histoire du principe de la Relativité). The prize is awarded for outstanding publications.

Tonnelat was elected as a member of the International Academy of the History of Science in 1973.

In 2026, Tonnelat was announced as one of 72 historical women in STEM whose names have been proposed to be added to the 72 men already celebrated on the Eiffel Tower. The plan was announced by the Mayor of Paris, Anne Hidalgo following the recommendations of a committee led by Isabelle Vauglin of Femmes et Sciences and Jean-François Martins, representing the operating company which runs the Eiffel Tower.
