= Jean Cerf =

French mathematician (born 1928)

- Born: 1928 (age 97–98)
- Education: École Normale Supérieure
- Known for: Cerf theory Pseudoisotopy theorem
- Awards: prix Servant (1970)
- Scientific career
- Fields: Mathematics
- Workplaces: University of Lille; University of Paris XI
- Doctoral advisor: Henri Cartan
- Doctoral students: Alain Chenciner

Jean Cerf (born 1928) is a French mathematician, specializing in topology.

== Education and career ==
Jean Cerf was born in Strasbourg, France, in 1928. He studied at the École Normale Supérieure, graduating in sciences in 1947. After passing his agrégation in mathematics in 1950, he obtained a doctorate with thesis supervised by Henri Cartan. Cerf became a maître de conférences at the University of Lille and was later appointed a professor at the University of Paris XI. He was also a director of research at CNRS.

Cerf's research deals with differential topology, cobordism, and symplectic topology. In 1966 he was an Invited Speaker at the ICM in Moscow. In 1968 Cerf proved that every orientation-preserving diffeomorphism of $S^3$ is isotopic to the identity. In 1970 Cerf proved the pseudo-isotopy theorem for simply connected manifolds. In 1970 he was awarded the prix Servant, together with Bernard Malgrange and André Néron (for independent work). 1971 he was the president of the Société Mathématique de France.

== Selected publications ==
- " Groupes d'automorphismes et groupes de difféomorphismes des variétés compactes de dimension 3." Bull. Soc. Math. France 87 (1959): 319–329.
- "Topologie de certains espaces de plongements." Bull. Soc. Math. France 89, no. 196 (1961): 227–380.
- "Théorèmes de fibration des espaces de plongements. Applications." Séminaire Henri Cartan 15 (1962): 1–13.
- "Travaux de Smale sur la structure des variétés." Seminaire Bourbaki 7 (1962): 113–128.
- "La nullité de Γ_{4}, généralisation du théorème de Schönflies pour S^{2}." In Sur les difféomorphismes de la sphère de dimension trois (Γ4= O), pp. 1–10. Springer, Berlin, Heidelberg, 1968. doi:10.1007/BFb0060396
- "La stratification naturelle des espaces de fonctions différentiables réelles et le théoreme de la pseudo-isotopie." Publications Mathématiques de l'Institut des Hautes Études Scientifiques 39, no. 1 (1970): 7–170. doi:10.1007/BF02684687
