= Cerf theory =

Study of smooth real-valued functions on manifold and their singularities

In mathematics, at the junction of singularity theory and differential topology, Cerf theory is the study of families of smooth real-valued functions

$$f\colon M \to \R$$

on a smooth manifold $M$, their generic singularities and the topology of the subspaces these singularities define, as subspaces of the function space. The theory is named after Jean Cerf, who initiated it in the late 1960s.

== An example ==
Marston Morse proved that, provided $M$ is compact, any smooth function $f\colon M \to \R$ can be approximated by a Morse function. Thus, for many purposes, one can replace arbitrary functions on $M$ by Morse functions.

As a next step, one could ask, 'if you have a one-parameter family of functions which start and end at Morse functions, can you assume the whole family is Morse?' In general, the answer is no. Consider, for example, the one-parameter family of functions on $M=\mathbb R$ given by

$$f_t(x)=(1/3)x^3-tx.$$

At time $t=-1$, it has no critical points, but at time $t=1$, it is a Morse function with two critical points at $x=\pm 1$.

Cerf showed that a one-parameter family of functions between two Morse functions can be approximated by one that is Morse at all but finitely many degenerate times. The degeneracies involve a birth/death transition of critical points, as in the above example when, at $t=0$, an index 0 and index 1 critical point are created as $t$ increases.

== A stratification of an infinite-dimensional space ==
Returning to the general case where $M$ is a compact manifold, let $\operatorname{Morse}(M)$ denote the space of Morse functions on $M$, and $\operatorname{Func}(M)$ the space of real-valued smooth functions on $M$. Morse proved that $\operatorname{Morse}(M) \subset \operatorname{Func}(M)$ is an open and dense subset in the $C^\infty$ topology.

For the purposes of intuition, here is an analogy. Think of the Morse functions as the top-dimensional open stratum in a stratification of $\operatorname{Func}(M)$ (we make no claim that such a stratification exists, but suppose one does). Notice that in stratified spaces, the co-dimension 0 open stratum is open and dense. For notational purposes, reverse the conventions for indexing the stratifications in a stratified space, and index the open strata not by their dimension, but by their co-dimension. This is convenient since $\operatorname{Func}(M)$ is infinite-dimensional if $M$ is not a finite set. By assumption, the open co-dimension 0 stratum of $\operatorname{Func}(M)$ is $\operatorname{Morse}(M)$, i.e.: $\operatorname{Func}(M)^0=\operatorname{Morse}(M)$. In a stratified space $X$, frequently $X^0$ is disconnected. The essential property of the co-dimension 1 stratum $X^1$ is that any path in $X$ which starts and ends in $X^0$ can be approximated by a path that intersects $X^1$ transversely in finitely many points, and does not intersect $X^i$ for any $i>1$.

Thus Cerf theory is the study of the positive co-dimensional strata of $\operatorname{Func}(M)$, i.e.: $\operatorname{Func}(M)^i$ for $i>0$. In the case of

$$f_t(x)=x^3-tx$$,

only for $t=0$ is the function not Morse, and

$$f_0(x)=x^3$$

has a cubic degenerate critical point corresponding to the birth/death transition.

== A single time parameter, statement of theorem ==
The Morse Theorem asserts that if $f \colon M \to \mathbb R$ is a Morse function, then near a critical point $p$ it is conjugate to a function $g \colon \mathbb R^n \to \mathbb R$ of the form

$$g(x_1,x_2,\dotsc,x_n) = f(p) + \epsilon_1 x_1^2 + \epsilon_2 x_2^2 + \dotsb + \epsilon_n x_n^2$$

where $\epsilon_i \in \{\pm 1\}$.

Cerf's one-parameter theorem asserts the essential property of the co-dimension one stratum.

Precisely, if $f_t \colon M \to \mathbb R$ is a one-parameter family of smooth functions on $M$ with $t \in [0,1]$, and $f_0, f_1$ Morse, then there exists a smooth one-parameter family $F_t \colon M \to \mathbb R$ such that $F_0 = f_0, F_1 = f_1$, $F$ is uniformly close to $f$ in the $C^k$-topology on functions $M \times [0,1] \to \mathbb R$. Moreover, $F_t$ is Morse at all but finitely many times. At a non-Morse time the function has only one degenerate critical point $p$, and near that point the family $F_t$ is conjugate to the family

$$g_t(x_1,x_2,\dotsc,x_n) = f(p) + x_1^3+\epsilon_1 tx_1 + \epsilon_2 x_2^2 + \dotsb + \epsilon_n x_n^2$$

where $\epsilon_i \in \{\pm 1\}, t \in [-1,1]$. If $\epsilon_1 = -1$ this is a one-parameter family of functions where two critical points are created (as $t$ increases), and for $\epsilon_1 = 1$ it is a one-parameter family of functions where two critical points are destroyed.

== Origins ==
The PL-Schoenflies problem for $S^2 \subset \R^3$ was solved by J. W. Alexander in 1924. His proof was adapted to the smooth case by Morse and Emilio Baiada. The essential property was used by Cerf in order to prove that every orientation-preserving diffeomorphism of $S^3$ is isotopic to the identity, seen as a one-parameter extension of the Schoenflies theorem for $S^2 \subset \R^3$. The corollary $\Gamma_4 = 0$ at the time had wide implications in differential topology. The essential property was later used by Cerf to prove the pseudo-isotopy theorem for high-dimensional simply-connected manifolds. The proof is a one-parameter extension of Stephen Smale's proof of the h-cobordism theorem (the rewriting of Smale's proof into the functional framework was done by Morse, and also by John Milnor and by Cerf, André Gramain, and Bernard Morin following a suggestion of René Thom).

Cerf's proof is built on the work of Thom and John Mather. A useful modern summary of Thom and Mather's work from that period is the book of Marty Golubitsky and Victor Guillemin.

== Applications ==
Beside the above-mentioned applications, Robion Kirby used Cerf Theory as a key step in justifying the Kirby calculus.

== Generalization ==
A stratification of the complement of an infinite co-dimension subspace of the space of smooth maps $\{ f \colon M \to \R \}$ was eventually developed by Francis Sergeraert.

During the seventies, the classification problem for pseudo-isotopies of non-simply connected manifolds was solved by Allen Hatcher and John Wagoner, discovering algebraic $K_i$-obstructions on $\pi_1 M$ ($i=2$) and $\pi_2 M$ ($i=1$) and by Kiyoshi Igusa, discovering obstructions of a similar nature on $\pi_1 M$ ($i=3$).
