= Seminar =

Form of academic instruction

An instructor discussing women's involvement in Bengali Wikipedia in a seminar in Dhaka in 2015

A seminar is a form of academic instruction, either at an academic institution or offered by a commercial or professional organization. It has the function of bringing together small groups for recurring meetings, focusing each time on some particular subject, in which everyone present is requested to participate. This is often accomplished through an ongoing Socratic dialogue with a seminar leader or instructor, or through a more formal presentation of research. It is essentially a place where assigned readings are discussed, questions can be raised and debates can be conducted.

== Etymology ==
The word seminar was borrowed from German (in which it is capitalized as Seminar), and is ultimately derived from the Latin word seminarium, meaning 'seed plot' (an old-fashioned term for 'seedbed'). Its root word is semen (Latin for 'seed').

== Overview ==
In some European universities, a seminar may be a large lecture course, especially when conducted by a renowned thinker (regardless of the size of the audience or the scope of student participation in discussion). Some non-English speaking countries in Europe use the word seminar (e.g. German Seminar, Slovenian seminar, Polish seminarium) to refer to a university class that includes a term paper or project, as opposed to a lecture class (e.g. German Vorlesung, Slovenian predavanje, Polish wykład). This does not correspond to the English use of the term. In some academic institutions, typically in scientific fields, the term "preceptorial" is used interchangeably with "seminar".

In North Indian universities, the term "seminar" refers to a course of intense study relating to the student's major. Seminars typically have significantly fewer students per professor than normal courses, and are generally more specific in topic of study. Seminars can revolve around term papers, exams, presentations, and several other assignments. Seminars are almost always required for university graduation. Normally, participants must not be beginners in the field under discussion at US and Canadian universities. Seminar classes are generally reserved for upper-class students, although at UK and Australian universities seminars are often used for all years. The idea behind the seminar system is to familiarize students more extensively with the methodology of their chosen subject and also to allow them to interact with examples of the practical problems that always occur during research work.

== Seminar rooms ==
"Seminar room" is often used as a name for a generic group study or work space at a library. Some seminar rooms are more tailored to a specific topic or field, literally a space designed for a seminar course or individualized self-study to occur.

== See also ==
- Academic conference
- French mathematical seminars
- Plenary session
- Poster session
- Senior seminar, aka Capstone course or final year course
- Symposium (academic)
- Webinar (a seminar attended through the Internet)
- Jesus Seminar, a group of 50 biblical criticism scholars and 100 laymen
