= Pseudoisotopy theorem =

On the connectivity of a group of diffeomorphisms of a manifold

In mathematics, the pseudoisotopy theorem is a theorem of Jean Cerf's which refers to the connectivity of a group of diffeomorphisms of a manifold.

== Statement ==
Given a differentiable manifold M (with or without boundary), a pseudo-isotopy diffeomorphism of M is a diffeomorphism of M × [0, 1] which restricts to the identity on $M \times \{0\} \cup \partial M \times [0,1]$.

Given $f : M \times [0,1] \to M \times [0,1]$ a pseudo-isotopy diffeomorphism, its restriction to $M \times \{1\}$ is a diffeomorphism $g$ of M. We say g is pseudo-isotopic to the identity. One should think of a pseudo-isotopy as something that is almost an isotopy—the obstruction to ƒ being an isotopy of g to the identity is whether or not ƒ preserves the level-sets $M \times \{t\}$ for $t \in [0,1]$.

Cerf's theorem states that, provided M is simply-connected and dim(M) ≥ 5, the group of pseudo-isotopy diffeomorphisms of M is connected. This implies that, a diffeomorphism of M is isotopic to the identity if and only if it is pseudo-isotopic to the identity.

== Relation to Cerf theory ==
The starting point of the proof is to think of the height function as a 1-parameter family of smooth functions on M by considering the function $\pi_{[0,1]} \circ f_t$. One then applies Cerf theory.
