= Mireille Martin-Deschamps =

French mathematician & academic

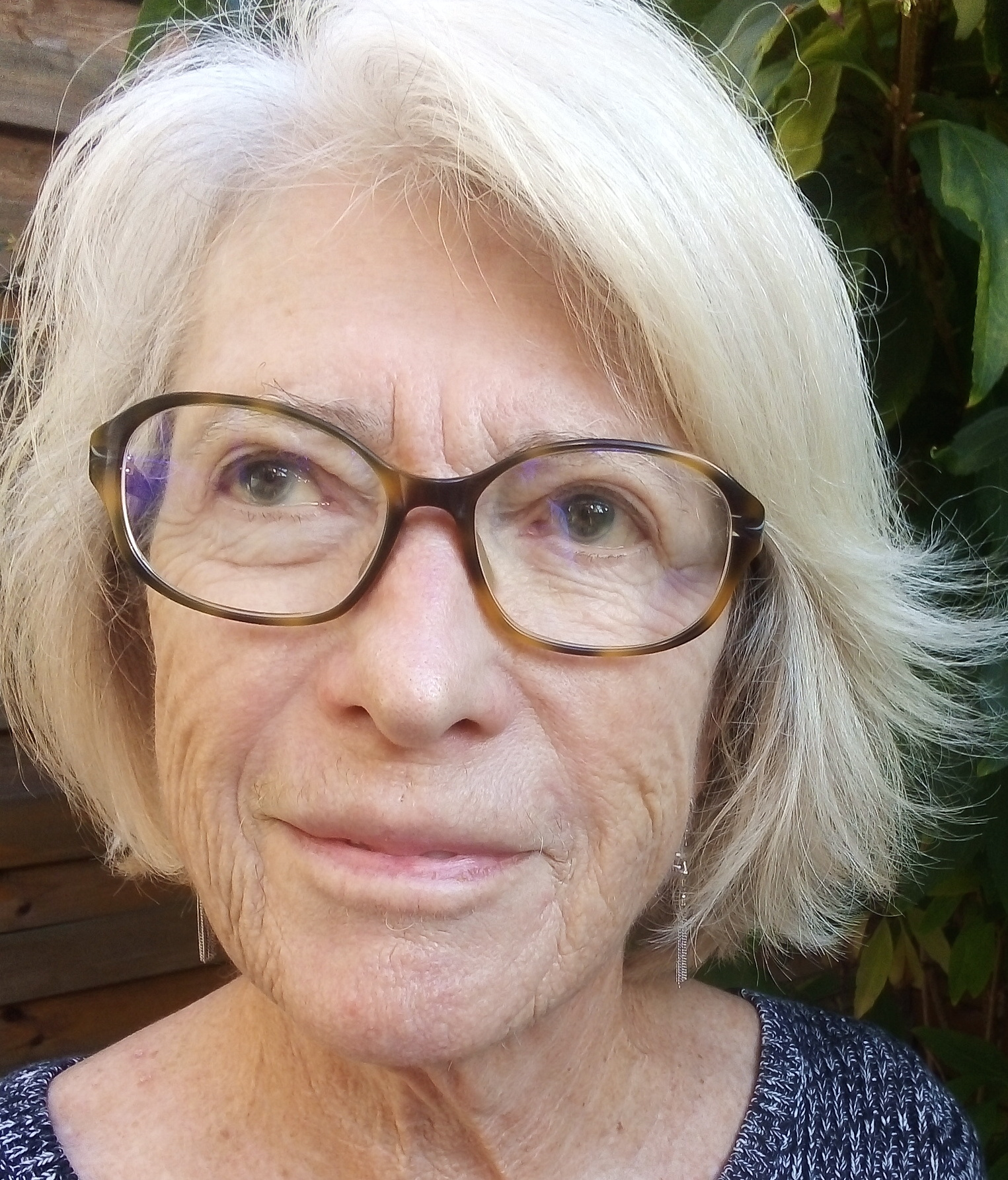
Mireille Martin-Deschamps in 2020

Mireille Martin-Deschamps is a French mathematician who studies the algebraic geometry of space curves. She was president of the Société mathématique de France.

== Education and career ==
Martin-Deschamps studied at the École normale supérieure de jeunes filles from 1965 to 1969. She defended her doctoral thesis in mathematics in 1976, supervised by Pierre Samuel and completed her doctorate in 1976 at Paris-Sud University. In 1985, she obtained the accreditation to supervise research at the University of Paris 7.

She was a researcher for the French National Centre for Scientific Research (CNRS) from 1969 until 2003, when she became a professor at Versailles Saint-Quentin-en-Yvelines University. In 2006, she became a member of the Executive Committee of the European Mathematical Society and was vice president of the society from 2011 to 2013.

From 2003 to 2007, she was a government commissioner (Chargée de mission) for mathematics and information sciences in the research department of the French Ministry of National Education, Research and Technology (Ministère de l'Education Nationale, de la Recherche et de la Technologie, MENRT). From 2006 to 2009, she was also a member of the scientific council of the French Committee for the Evaluation of University and Scientific Cooperation with Brazil (Comité Français d'Évaluation de la Coopération Universitaire et Scientifique avec le Brésil, COFECUB), and since 2002, she was a member of the scientific council of the City of Paris. In 2008 and 2009, she was president of the jury for the Prix La Recherche.

She retired in 2010, and the university held a colloquium in honor of her retirement.

=== Research ===
Martin-Deschamps's doctoral work was in algebraic geometry in the style of Alexander Grothendieck. Her later work involved Hilbert schemes of space curves in projective space.

=== Memberships ===
- President of the Société Mathématique de France from 1998 to 2001.
- Member of the executive committee of the European Mathematical Society beginning in 2006.

== Honors ==
In 2004, she was made a Knight of the Legion of Honour
