= Annales scientifiques de l'École normale supérieure =

- Discipline: Mathematics
- Language: English, French

Publication details
- History: 1864-present
- Publisher: Société Mathématique de France (France)

Standard abbreviations
- ISO 4: Ann. Sci. Éc. Norm. Supér.

Indexing
- ISSN: 0012-9593

Links
- Journal homepage

Annales scientifiques de l'École normale supérieure is a French scientific journal of mathematics published by the Société Mathématique de France. It was established in 1864 by the French chemist Louis Pasteur and published articles in mathematics, physics, chemistry, biology, and geology. In 1900, it became a purely mathematical journal. It is published with help of the Centre national de la recherche scientifique. Its web site is hosted by the mathematics department of the École Normale Supérieure.
