= Déodat Gratet de Dolomieu =

18th-century French geologist, namesake of Dolomite

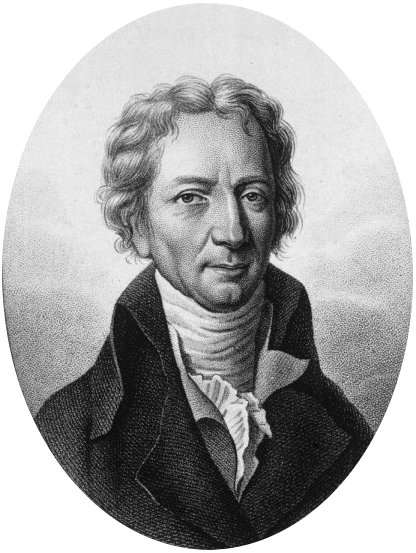
- Déodat Gratet de Dolomieu (drawing by M. Cordier, engraved by Ambroise Tardieu)
- Born: 23 June 1750 in Dolomieu; Kingdom of France
- Died: 28 November 1801 (aged 51) in Châteauneuf; France
- Known for: First description of the rock named dolomie (or dolomite)
- Awards: Commander of the Sovereign and Military Order of the Knights of Saint John (Knights Hospitaller, Knights of Malta)
- Scientific career
- Fields: Geology; Mineralogy; Volcanology

Dieudonné Sylvain Guy Tancrède de Gratet de Dolomieu usually known as Déodat de Dolomieu (French pronunciation: [deɔda də dɔlɔmjø]; 23 June 1750 – 28 November 1801) was a French geologist. The mineral and the rock dolomite and the largest summital crater on the Piton de la Fournaise volcano were named after him.

== Biography ==
Déodat de Dolomieu was born in Dauphiné, France, one of 11 children of Marie-Françoise de Berénger and her husband, the Marquis de Dolomieu. As a child young Déodat showed considerable intellectual potential and special interest in the natural surroundings of his home in the Alps of southeastern France. De Dolomieu began his military career in the Sovereign and Military Order of the Knights of Saint John (also called the Knights Hospitaller or the Knights of Malta) at the age of 12. His association with the Maltese order caused him difficulties throughout his life, beginning with a duel, which he fought at the age of 18, when he killed a fellow member of the order. For this infraction he was sentenced to life in prison but due to the intercession of Pope Clement XIII he was released after only one year.

== Career ==
During the years prior to the French Revolution Dolomieu took full part in the intellectual ferment of France and the rest of Europe. He maintained numerous social contacts among the nobility and although he never married, Dolomieu had something of a reputation as a ladies' man. Through his friend and mentor, the Duke de La Rochefoucauld, Dolomieu was made a corresponding member of the Royal Academy of Sciences. He spent his spare time taking scientific excursions throughout Europe collecting mineral specimens and visiting mining areas. His particular interests included mineralogy, volcanology, and the origin of mountain ranges. Although Dolomieu was greatly interested in volcanoes, he became convinced that water played a major role in shaping the surface of the Earth through a series of prehistoric, catastrophic events. Dolomieu was not a uniformitarian geologist. He has been described as a "non-actualistic catastrophist".

His contemporary, James Hutton, did not publish the principle of uniformitarianism until 1795. Dolomieu was an observationalist and spent much of his time collecting and categorizing geological data. Unlike Hutton, no scientific principles or theories are credited to him, although he left his permanent mark on geology in another way: that is by discovering the mineral dolomite that would be named after him.

=== Geology of the Dolomites ===
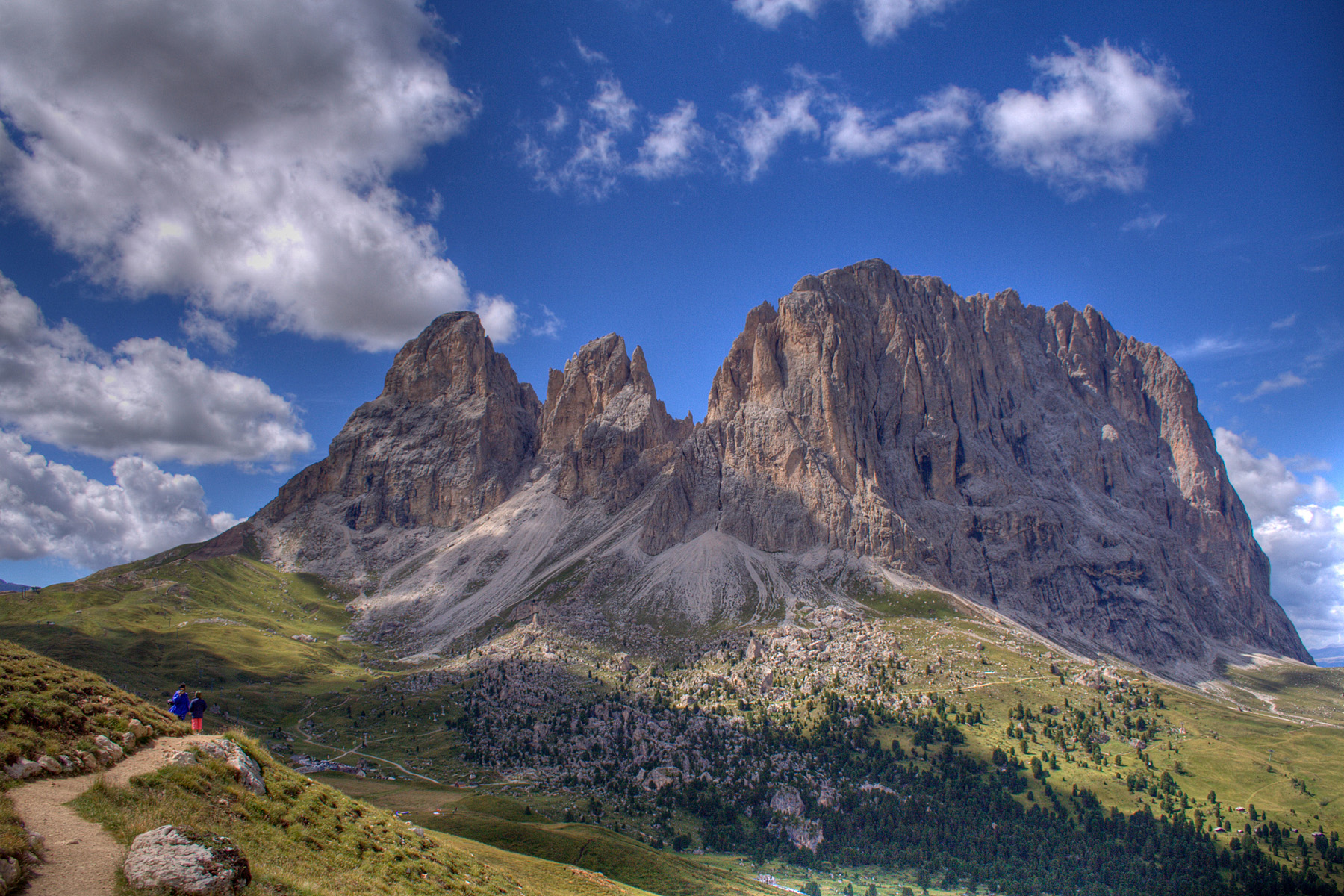
The Dolomites, a mountain range in the Italian Alps, were named after de Dolomieu, who first described the dolomite mineral found there.

During one of his voyages to the Alps of Tyrol (today part of northeastern Italy) Dolomieu discovered a calcareous rock which, unlike limestone, did not effervesce with weak hydrochloric acid. He published these observations in 1791 in the well-known French science magazine Journal de Physique. In March 1792, the rock was named dolomie (or dolomite, in English) by Nicolas-Théodore de Saussure. Today both the rock and its major mineral constituent bear the name of Dolomieu, as do the Dolomites, the mountain range of northeastern Italy. Dolomieu was not the first to describe the mineral dolomite. Carl Linnaeus was likely the first to note the fact that this rock resembled limestone but does not effervesce with dilute acid. In his book Oryctographia Carniola, oder physikalische Erdbeschreibung des Herzogthums Krain, Istrien und zum Theil der benachbarten Länder, published by Johann Gottlob Immanuel Breitkopf in 1778, the Austrian naturalist Belsazar Hacquet also observed this distinction between limestone and a rock that Hacquet described as lapis suillus. The two men met in Laibach in 1784, when Dolomieu visited Sigmund Zois. However, Hacquet was well aware of the fact that the description of a limestone that would not effervesce with acid (and therefore had to be different from normal limestone) by the famous Carl Linnaeus in 1768 preceded his own. On p. 5 of the second volume of his Oryctographia Carniola, which appeared in 1781, Hacquet stated that the white powder he had found near the town of Vorle ("untern Theil der Oberkrain") a white powder that strongly resembled limestone but would not react with dilute hydrochloric acid, reminded him of the marmor tardum described by Linnaeus.

=== Knights of Malta ===
In addition to his scientific activities Dolomieu continued to advance in rank in the Knights of Malta and was promoted to commander in 1780. However, he continued to have difficulties because his liberal political leanings were unpopular among the conservative nobility who controlled the Order. De Dolomieu retired from active military service in 1780 to devote all of his time to travels and scientific work.

=== French Revolution ===
De Dolomieu was at first a strong partisan of the French Revolution, which began in 1789. However, the murder of his friend the Duc de la Rochefoucauld, a near-escape from the guillotine, and the beheading of several of his relatives, turned him against the revolution. During this time Dolomieu became a supporter of Napoleon Bonaparte. In 1795, having lost his fortune in the revolution, Dolomieu accepted the position of professor of natural sciences at the École Centrale Paris and started to write the mineralogical section of the Encyclopédie Méthodique. The following year he was appointed inspector of mines and professor at the École Nationale Supérieure des Mines de Paris, where his portrait still hangs in the library. His extensive mineral collection is today housed at the Muséum National d'Histoire Naturelle of Paris.

=== Bonaparte era ===
By 1798 De Dolomieu had developed an international reputation as one of the leading geologists in the world and was invited to join the scientific expedition accompanying Bonaparte's invasion of Egypt, as part of the natural history and physics section of the Institut d'Égypte. In March 1799 Dolomieu became ill and was forced to leave Alexandria, Egypt for France. His ship, caught in a storm, sought refuge at the port of Taranto, Italy where Dolomieu was made a prisoner of war. General Thomas-Alexandre Dumas, the father of Alexandre Dumas, the author, was also captured and held. The city was part of the Kingdom of the Two Sicilies, which was then at war with France. Dolomieu had previously made a powerful enemy of the grand master of the Maltese order when he helped negotiate the surrender of the island of Malta to Napoleon. The grand master denounced Dolomieu and he was transferred to Messina, Sicily, and imprisoned under horrible conditions, in solitary confinement, for the next 21 months.

The imprisonment of a world-famous scientist, under such conditions, was abhorrent to the intellectual community of Europe. Even the scientific community of England (which was at war with France) protested the confinement. Talleyrand, the French foreign minister, attempted to negotiate Dolomieu’s release through the pope. Napoleon, who was first consul of France at the time, felt that asking for such an intervention by the pope would be dishonorable. The future emperor's approach to the problem was more direct. In the spring of 1800 Napoleon led the French army into Italy, delivering a crushing blow to the Austrians and their Italian allies on 14 June at the Battle of Marengo. All of Italy then came within Napoleon's sphere. One of the terms dictated by Napoleon in the peace treaty of Florence (March 1801) was the immediate release of Dolomieu.

Upon his liberation Dolomieu resumed his scientific studies and field excursions. But his health, broken by the long imprisonment in Sicily, gave way during a trip to the Alps. Déodat de Dolomieu died on 28 November 1801 at the home of his sister at Châteauneuf.

== Works ==
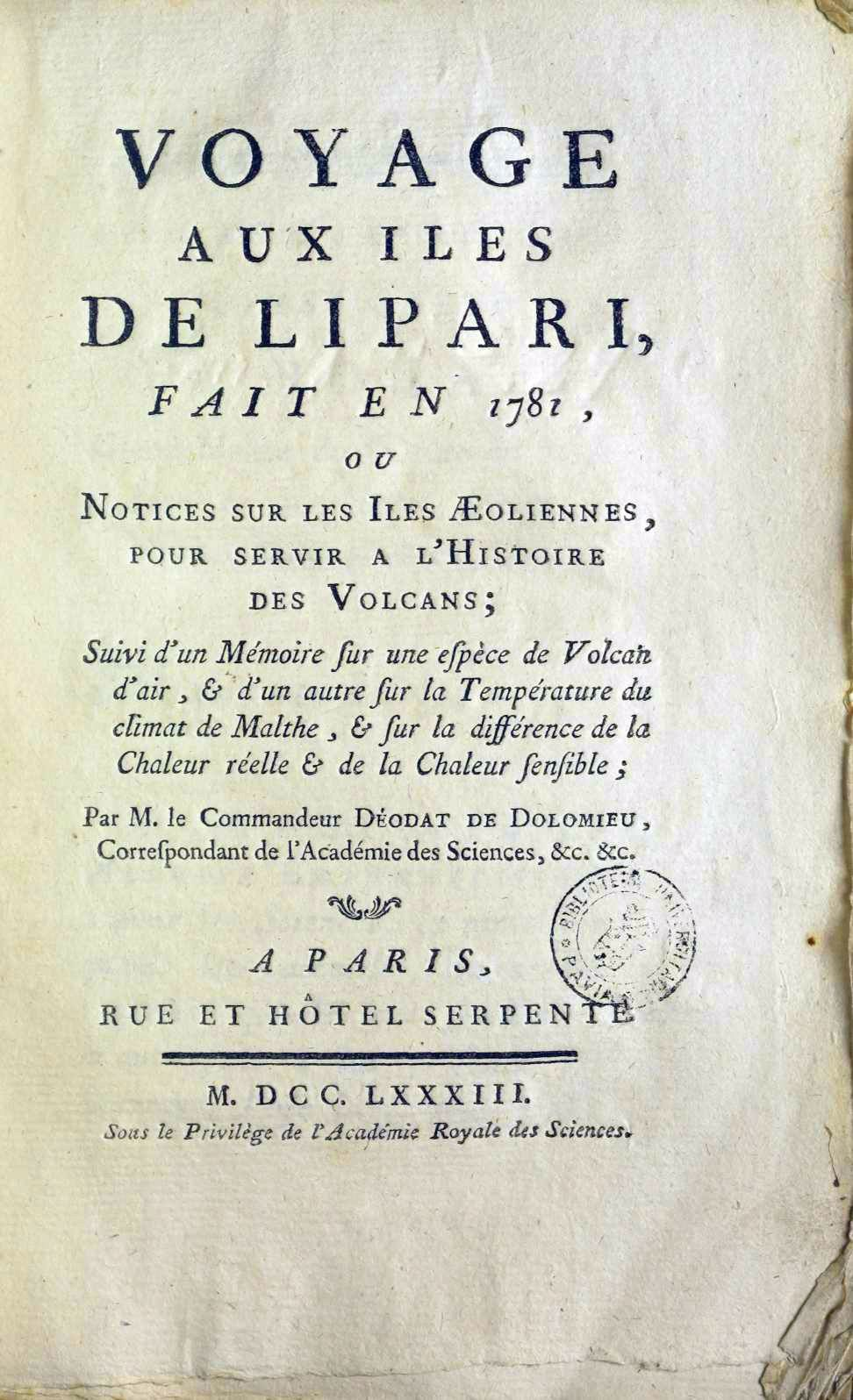
Voyage aux iles de Lipari, 1783

- Voyage aux iles de Lipari (in French). Paris: Gaspard-Joseph Cuchet. 1783.

== Legacy ==
George F. Kunz wrote about his contributions to mineralogy.

Dolomieu's student and famous naturalist Jean-Baptiste Bory de Saint-Vincent gave his name in 1801 to the largest summital crater of the Piton de la Fournaise volcano on the French island of Réunion, the cratère Dolomieu.

== Bibliography ==
- Carozzi, A. V.; Zenger, D. H. (1981). "On a type of calcareous rock that reacts very slightly with acid and that phosphoresces on being struck (translation, with notes of Dolomieu's paper, 1791)". Journal of Geological Education. 29: 4–10.
- Dolomieu, D. G. de (October 1791). "Sur un de pierres trés-peu effervescentes avec les acides of phosphorescentes par la collision". Journal de Physique. 39: 3–10.
- Zenger, D. H., Bourrouilh-Le Jan, F. G. and Carozzi, A. V. (1994). "Dolomieu and the first description of dolomite". In Purser, B.; Tucker, M.; Zenger, D. (eds.). Dolomites A volume in honor of Dolomieu. International Association of Sedimentologists: Special Publication 21. pp. 21–28. ISBN 0-632-03787-3.
- Charles-Vallin, T. (2003). Les aventures du chevalier géologue Déodat de Dolomieu. Presses Universitaires de Grenoble, Grenoble. pp. 296 p.
- Gaudant, J., ed. (2005). Dolomieu et la géologie de son temps. Les Presses de l'École des Mines de Paris, Paris. pp. 200 p.
- Caminada, P. (2006). Das abenteuerliche Leben des Forschungsreisenden Déodat de Dolomieu 1750–1801. Projekte Verlag, Halle. pp. 285 p.
