= Dolomieu, Isère =

Dolomieu
- Commune
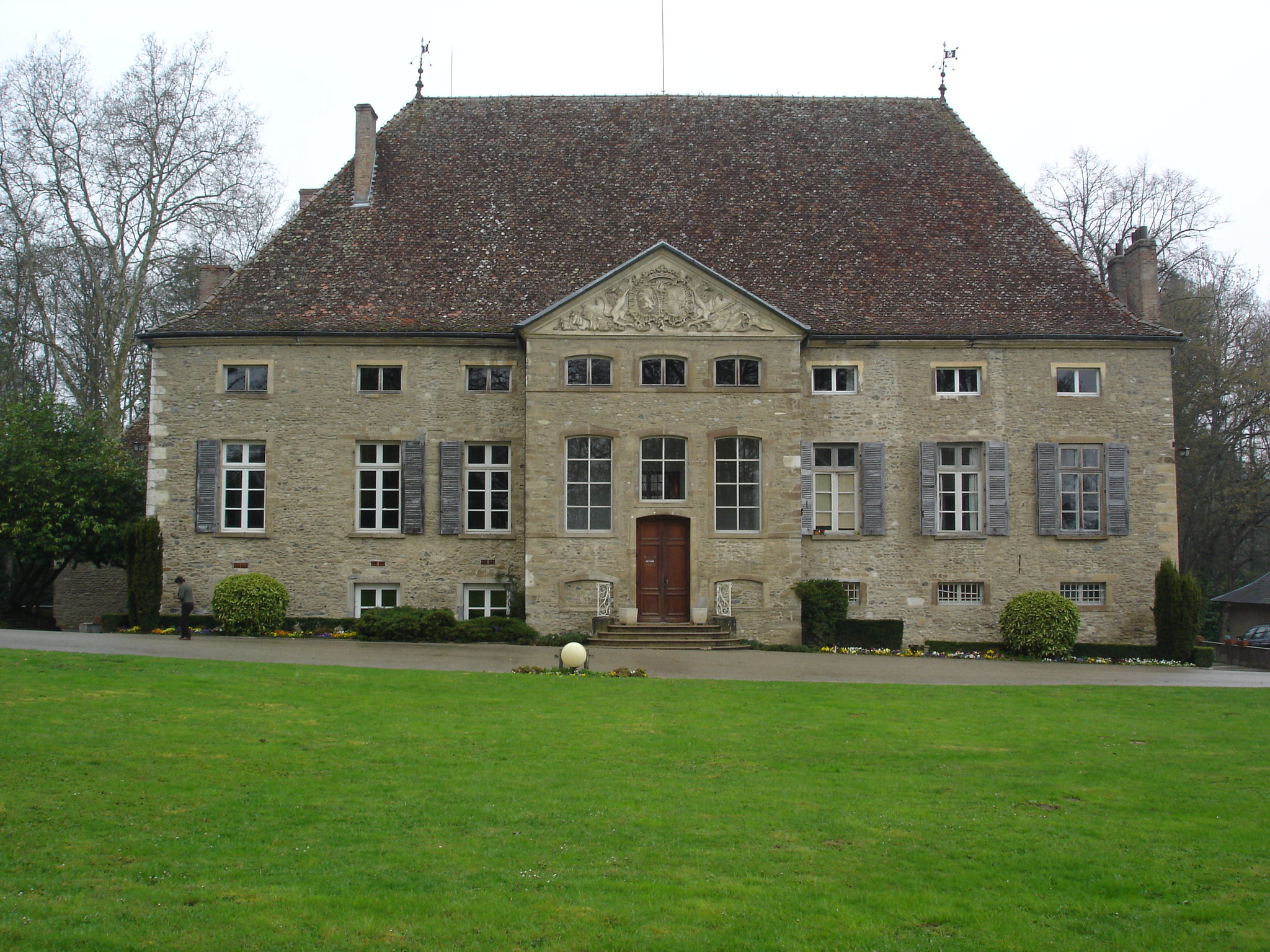
- 18th-century chateau
- Location of Dolomieu
- Location within France Location within Auvergne-Rhône-Alpes
- Coordinates: 45°36′39″N 5°29′52″E
- Country: France
- Region: Auvergne-Rhône-Alpes
- Department: Isère
- Arrondissement: La Tour-du-Pin
- Canton: La Tour-du-Pin

Government
  - Mayor (2020–2026): Delphine Hartmann
- Area^{1}: 13.3 km^{2} (5.1 sq mi)
- Elevation: 400 m (1,300 ft)
- Population (2023): 3,173
  - Density: 239/km^{2} (618/sq mi)
- Time zone: UTC+01:00 (CET)
  - Summer (DST): UTC+02:00 (CEST)
- INSEE/Postal code: 38148 /38110
- ^{1} French Land Register data, which excludes lakes, ponds, glaciers > 1 km^{2} (0.386 sq mi or 247 acres) and river estuaries.

Dolomieu (French pronunciation: [dɔlɔmjø]) is a commune in the Isère department in southeastern France.

== Population ==
Historical population

Year	Pop.	±% p.a.
1793	1,242	—
1800	1,408	+1.81%
1806	1,344	−0.77%
1821	1,622	+1.26%
1831	2,006	+2.15%
1836	2,124	+1.15%
1841	2,202	+0.72%
1846	2,236	+0.31%
1851	2,292	+0.50%
1856	2,224	−0.60%
1861	2,240	+0.14%
1866	2,352	+0.98%
1872	2,487	+0.93%
1876	2,560	+0.73%
1881	2,527	−0.26%
1886	2,511	−0.13%
1891	2,400	−0.90%
1896	2,279	−1.03%
1901	2,191	−0.78%

Year	Pop.	±% p.a.
1906	2,088	−0.96%
1911	2,016	−0.70%
1921	1,785	−1.21%
1926	1,715	−0.80%
1931	1,601	−1.37%
1936	1,502	−1.27%
1946	1,322	−1.27%
1954	1,307	−0.14%
1962	1,256	−0.50%
1968	1,283	+0.36%
1975	1,348	+0.71%
1982	1,662	+3.04%
1990	2,135	+3.18%
1999	2,369	+1.16%
2007	2,787	+2.05%
2012	3,025	+1.65%
2017	3,167	+0.92%
2023	3,173	+0.03%

Source: EHESS and INSEE (1968-2023)

== Twin towns ==
Dolomieu is twinned with:

- Agordo, Italy, since 2005

== Personalities ==
Mathematician Élie Joseph Cartan was born here in 1869. Also geologist Déodat Gratet de Dolomieu was born here in 1750.

== See also ==
- Communes of the Isère department
