= Cartan's lemma (potential theory) =

Mathematical Lemma

In potential theory, a branch of mathematics, Cartan's lemma, named after Henri Cartan, is a bound on the measure and complexity of the set on which a logarithmic Newtonian potential is small.

== Statement of the lemma ==
The following statement can be found in Levin's book.

Let μ be a finite positive Borel measure on the complex plane C with μ(C) = n. Let u(z) be the logarithmic potential of μ:

$$u(z) = \frac{1}{2\pi}\int_\mathbf{C} \log|z-\zeta|\,d\mu(\zeta)$$

Given H ∈ (0, 1), there exist discs of radii r_{i} such that

$$\sum_i r_i < 5H$$

and

$$u(z) \ge \frac{n}{2\pi}\log \frac{H}{e}$$

for all z outside the union of these discs.
