= Georges Poitou =

French mathematician

Georges Poitou (11 February 1926 – 14 December 1989) was a French mathematician. Along with John Tate, Poitou introduced the Poitou–Tate duality theorem.
