= Charles Pisot =

French mathematician

- Born: 2 March 1910; Obernai, Alsace
- Died: 7 March 1984 (aged 74); Paris
- Education: École Normale Supérieure
- Known for: Pisot–Vijayaraghavan number
- Scientific career
- Fields: Mathematics
- Workplaces: University of Paris
- Doctoral advisor: Arnaud Denjoy
- Doctoral students: Yvette Amice; Jean-Marc Deshouillers; Jean-Louis Nicolas

Charles Pisot (2 March 1910 – 7 March 1984) was a French mathematician. He is chiefly recognized as one of the primary investigators of the numerical set associated with his name, the Pisot–Vijayaraghavan numbers.

He followed the classical path of great French mathematicians by studying at the École Normale Supérieure on Ulm street, where he was received first at the agrégation in 1932. He then began his academic career at the Bordeaux University before being offered a chair at the Science Faculty of Paris and at the École Polytechnique. He was a member of Bourbaki.

Also of interest is the recently solved Pisot conjecture on rational functions. (For a technical account and bibliography see Umberto Zannier's paper in the Annals of Mathematics.) He was also the coauthor (with Marc Zamansky) of a textbook in general mathematics (titled Mathématiques générales) which was very popular in the 1960s and 1970s.
