= Cartan pair =

Technical condition on the relationship between a reductive Lie algebra and a subalgebra

In the mathematical fields of Lie theory and algebraic topology, the notion of Cartan pair is a technical condition on the relationship between a reductive Lie algebra $\mathfrak{g}$ and a subalgebra $\mathfrak{k}$ reductive in $\mathfrak{g}$.

A reductive pair $(\mathfrak{g},\mathfrak{k})$ is said to be Cartan if the relative Lie algebra cohomology

$$H^*(\mathfrak{g},\mathfrak{k})$$

is isomorphic to the tensor product of the characteristic subalgebra

$$\mathrm{im}\big(S(\mathfrak{k}^*) \to H^*(\mathfrak{g},\mathfrak{k})\big)$$

and an exterior subalgebra $\bigwedge \hat P$ of $H^*(\mathfrak{g})$, where

- $\hat P$, the Samelson subspace, are those primitive elements in the kernel of the composition $P \overset\tau\to S(\mathfrak{g}^*) \to S(\mathfrak{k}^*)$,
- $P$ is the primitive subspace of $H^*(\mathfrak{g})$,
- $\tau$ is the transgression,
- and the map $S(\mathfrak{g}^*) \to S(\mathfrak{k}^*)$ of symmetric algebras is induced by the restriction map of dual vector spaces $\mathfrak{g}^* \to \mathfrak{k}^*$.

On the level of Lie groups, if G is a compact, connected Lie group and K a closed connected subgroup, there are natural fiber bundles

$$G \to G_K \to BK$$,

where $G_K := (EK \times G)/K \simeq G/K$ is the homotopy quotient, here homotopy equivalent to the regular quotient, and

$$G/K \overset\chi\to BK \overset{r}\to BG$$.

Then the characteristic algebra is the image of $\chi^*\colon H^*(BK) \to H^*(G/K)$, the transgression $\tau\colon P \to H^*(BG)$ from the primitive subspace P of $H^*(G)$ is that arising from the edge maps in the Serre spectral sequence of the universal bundle $G \to EG \to BG$, and the subspace $\hat P$ of $H^*(G/K)$ is the kernel of $r^* \circ \tau$.
