= Jacques Deny =

French mathematician

- Born: 22 October 1916; Algiers, French Algeria
- Died: 1 January 2016 (aged 99); Gerardmer, Lorraine, France
- Education: University of Strasbourg
- Scientific career
- Fields: Mathematics
- Workplaces: Paris-Sud 11 University
- Doctoral advisor: Henri Cartan
- Doctoral students: Paul-André Meyer

Jacques Deny (French: [dəni]; 22 October 1916 – 1 January 2016) was a French mathematician. He made notable contributions to the field of analysis, in particular potential theory.
