= Élie Cartan =

French mathematician (1869–1951)

Élie Cartan ForMemRS
- Born: Élie Joseph Cartan; 9 April 1869; Dolomieu, Isère, France
- Died: 6 May 1951 (aged 82); Paris, France
- Education: University of Paris
- Known for: Lie groups (Cartan's theorem); Vector spaces and exterior algebra Differential geometry Special and general relativity Differential forms Quantum mechanics (spinors, rotating vectors); List of things named after Élie Cartan
- Children: Henri Cartan
- Relatives: Anna Cartan (sister)
- Awards: Leconte Prize (1930); Lobachevsky Prize (1937); President of the French Academy of Sciences (1946); Fellow of the Royal Society (1947)
- Scientific career
- Fields: Mathematics and physics
- Workplaces: University of Paris; École Normale Supérieure
- Thesis: Sur la structure des groupes de transformations finis et continus (1894)
- Doctoral advisor: Gaston Darboux; Sophus Lie
- Doctoral students: Charles Ehresmann; Mohsen Hashtroodi; Kentaro Yano
- Other notable students: Shiing-Shen Chern

Élie Joseph Cartan (French: [kaʁtɑ̃]; 9 April 1869 – 6 May 1951) was an influential French mathematician who did fundamental work in the theory of Lie groups, differential systems (coordinate-free geometric formulation of PDEs), and differential geometry. He also made significant contributions to general relativity and indirectly to quantum mechanics. He is widely regarded as one of the greatest mathematicians of the twentieth century.

His son Henri Cartan was an influential mathematician working in algebraic topology.

== Life ==
Élie Cartan was born 9 April 1869 in the village of Dolomieu, Isère to Joseph Cartan (1837–1917) and Anne Cottaz (1841–1927). Joseph Cartan was the village blacksmith; Élie Cartan recalled that his childhood had passed under "blows of the anvil, which started every morning from dawn", and that "his mother, during those rare minutes when she was free from taking care of the children and the house, was working with a spinning-wheel". Élie had an elder sister Jeanne-Marie (1867–1931) who became a dressmaker; a younger brother Léon (1872–1956) who became a blacksmith working in his father's smithy; and a younger sister Anna Cartan (1878–1923), who, partly under Élie's influence, entered École Normale Supérieure (as Élie had before) and chose a career as a mathematics teacher at a lycée (secondary school).

Élie Cartan entered an elementary school in Dolomieu and was the best student in the school. One of his teachers, M. Dupuis, recalled "Élie Cartan was a shy student, but an unusual light of great intellect was shining in his eyes, and this was combined with an excellent memory". Antonin Dubost, then the representative of Isère, visited the school and was impressed by Cartan's unusual abilities. He recommended Cartan to participate in a contest for a scholarship in a lycée. Cartan prepared for the contest under the supervision of M. Dupuis and passed at the age of ten. He spent five years (1879–1884) at the college of Vienne and then two years (1884–1886) at the Lycée of Grenoble. In 1886 he moved to the Lycée Janson de Sailly in Paris to study sciences for two years; there he met and befriended his classmate Jean-Baptiste Perrin (1870–1942) who later became a famous physicist in France.

Cartan enrolled in the École Normale Supérieure in 1888, where he attended lectures by Charles Hermite (1822–1901), Jules Tannery (1848–1910), Gaston Darboux (1842–1917), Paul Appell (1855–1930), Émile Picard (1856–1941), Édouard Goursat (1858–1936), and Henri Poincaré (1854–1912) whose lectures were what Cartan thought most highly of.

After graduation from the École Normale Superieure in 1891, Cartan was drafted into the French army, where he served one year and attained the rank of sergeant. For the next two years (1892–1894) Cartan returned to ENS and, following the advice of his classmate Arthur Tresse (1868–1958) who studied under Sophus Lie in the years 1888–1889, worked on the subject of classification of simple Lie groups, which was started by Wilhelm Killing. In 1892 Lie came to Paris, at the invitation of Darboux and Tannery, and met Cartan for the first time.

Cartan defended his dissertation, The structure of finite continuous groups of transformations in 1894 in the Faculty of Sciences in the Sorbonne. Between 1894 and 1896, Cartan was a lecturer at the University of Montpellier; during the years 1896 through 1903, he was a lecturer in the Faculty of Sciences at the University of Lyon.

In 1903, while in Lyon, Cartan married Marie-Louise Bianconi (1880–1950); in the same year, Cartan became a professor in the Faculty of Sciences at the University of Nancy. In 1904, Cartan's first son, Henri Cartan, who later became an influential mathematician, was born; in 1906, another son, Jean Cartan, who became a composer, was born. In 1909 Cartan moved his family to Paris and worked as a lecturer in the Faculty of Sciences in the Sorbonne. In 1912 Cartan became Professor there, based on the reference he received from Poincaré. He remained in Sorbonne until his retirement in 1940 and spent the last years of his life teaching mathematics at the École Normale Supérieure for girls.

As a student of Cartan, the geometer Shiing-Shen Chern wrote:

Usually the day after [meeting with Cartan] I would get a letter from him. He would say, “After you left, I thought more about your questions...”—he had some results, and some more questions, and so on. He knew all these papers on simple Lie groups, Lie algebras, all by heart. When you saw him on the street, when a certain issue would come up, he would pull out some old envelope and write something and give you the answer. And sometimes it took me hours or even days to get the same answer... I had to work very hard.

In 1921 he became a foreign member of the Polish Academy of Learning and in 1937 a foreign member of the Royal Netherlands Academy of Arts and Sciences. In 1938 he participated in the International Committee composed to organise the International Congresses for the Unity of Science.

He died in 1951 in Paris after a long illness.

In 1976, a lunar crater was named after him. Before, it was designated Apollonius D.

== Work ==
In the Travaux, Cartan breaks down his work into 15 areas. Using modern terminology, they are:

1. Lie theory
2. Representations of Lie groups
3. Hypercomplex numbers, division algebras
4. Systems of PDEs, Cartan–Kähler theorem
5. Theory of equivalence
6. Integrable systems, theory of prolongation and systems in involution
7. Infinite-dimensional groups and pseudogroups
8. Differential geometry and moving frames
9. Generalised spaces with structure groups and connections, Cartan connection, holonomy, Weyl tensor
10. Geometry and topology of Lie groups
11. Riemannian geometry
12. Symmetric spaces
13. Topology of compact groups and their homogeneous spaces
14. Integral invariants and classical mechanics
15. Relativity, spinors

Cartan's mathematical work led to the development of analysis on differentiable manifolds, which is a central tool in modern mathematics.

=== Lie groups ===
Cartan was practically alone in the field of Lie groups for the thirty years after his dissertation. Lie had considered these groups chiefly as systems of analytic transformations of an analytic manifold, depending analytically on a finite number of parameters. A very fruitful approach to the study of these groups was opened in 1888 when Wilhelm Killing systematically started to study the group in itself, independent of its possible actions on other manifolds. At that time (and until 1920) only local properties were considered, so the main object of study for Killing was the Lie algebra of the group, which exactly reflects the local properties in purely algebraic terms. Killing's great achievement was the determination of all simple complex Lie algebras; his proofs, however, were often defective, and Cartan's thesis was devoted mainly to giving a rigorous foundation to the local theory and to proving the existence of the exceptional Lie algebras belonging to each of the types of simple complex Lie algebras that Killing had shown to be possible. Later Cartan completed the local theory by explicitly solving two fundamental problems, for which he had to develop entirely new methods: the classification of simple real Lie algebras and the determination of all irreducible linear representations of simple Lie algebras, by means of the notion of weight of a representation, which he introduced for that purpose. It was in the process of determining the linear representations of the orthogonal groups that Cartan discovered in 1913 the spinors, which later played such an important role in quantum mechanics.

After 1925, Cartan grew more and more interested in topological questions. Spurred by Weyl's brilliant results on compact groups, he developed new methods for the study of global properties of Lie groups; in particular he showed that topologically a connected Lie group is a product of a Euclidean space and a compact group, and for compact Lie groups he discovered that the possible fundamental groups of the underlying manifold can be read from the structure of the Lie algebra of the group. Finally, he outlined a method of determining the Betti numbers of compact Lie groups, again reducing the problem to an algebraic question on their Lie algebras, which has since been completely solved.

=== Lie pseudogroups ===
After solving the problem of the structure of Lie groups which Cartan (following Lie) called "finite continuous groups" (or "finite transformation groups"), Cartan posed the similar problem for "infinite continuous groups", which are now called Lie pseudogroups, an infinite-dimensional analogue of Lie groups (there are other infinite generalizations of Lie groups). The Lie pseudogroup considered by Cartan is a set of transformations between subsets of a space that contains the identical transformation and possesses the property that the result of composition of two transformations in this set (whenever this is possible) belongs to the same set. Since the composition of two transformations is not always possible, the set of transformations is not a group (but a groupoid in modern terminology), thus the name pseudogroup. Cartan considered only those transformations of manifolds for which there is no subdivision of manifolds into the classes transposed by the transformations under consideration. Such pseudogroups of transformations are called primitive. Cartan showed that every infinite-dimensional primitive pseudogroup of complex analytic transformations belongs to one of the six classes:

- The pseudogroup of all analytic transformations of n complex variables.
- The pseudogroup of all analytic transformations of n complex variables with a constant Jacobian (i.e., transformations that multiply all volumes by the same complex number).
- The pseudogroup of all analytic transformations of n complex variables whose Jacobian is equal to one (i.e., transformations that preserve volumes).
- The pseudogroup of all analytic transformations of 2n > 4 complex variables that preserve a certain double integral (the symplectic pseudogroup).
- The pseudogroup of all analytic transformations of 2n > 4 complex variables that multiply the above-mentioned double integral by a complex function.
- The pseudogroup of all analytic transformations of 2n + 1 complex variables that multiply a certain form by a complex function (the contact pseudogroup).

There are similar classes of pseudogroups for primitive pseudogroups of real transformations defined by analytic functions of real variables.

=== Differential systems ===
Cartan's methods in the theory of differential systems are perhaps his most profound achievement. Breaking with tradition, he sought from the start to formulate and solve the problems in a completely invariant fashion, independent of any particular choice of variables and unknown functions. He thus was able for the first time to give a precise definition of what is a "general" solution of an arbitrary differential system. His next step was to try to determine all "singular" solutions as well, by a method of "prolongation" that consists in adjoining new unknowns and new equations to the given system in such a way that any singular solution of the original system becomes a general solution of the new system. Although Cartan showed that in every example which he treated his method led to the complete determination of all singular solutions, he did not succeed in proving in general that this would always be the case for an arbitrary system; such a proof was obtained in 1955 by Masatake Kuranishi.

Cartan's chief tool was the calculus of exterior differential forms, which he helped to create and develop in the ten years following his thesis and then proceeded to apply to a variety of problems in differential geometry, Lie groups, analytical dynamics, and general relativity. He discussed a large number of examples, treating them in an extremely elliptic style that was made possible only by his uncanny algebraic and geometric insight.

=== Differential geometry ===
Cartan's contributions to differential geometry are no less impressive, and it may be said that he revitalized the whole subject, for the initial work of Riemann and Darboux was being lost in dreary computations and minor results, much as had happened to elementary geometry and invariant theory a generation earlier. His guiding principle was a considerable extension of the method of "moving frames" of Darboux and Ribaucour, to which he gave a tremendous flexibility and power, far beyond anything that had been done in classical differential geometry. In modern terms, the method consists in associating to a fiber bundle E the principal fiber bundle having the same base and having at each point of the base a fiber equal to the group that acts on the fiber of E at the same point. If E is the tangent bundle over the base (which since Lie was essentially known as the manifold of "contact elements"), the corresponding group is the general linear group (or the orthogonal group in classical Euclidean or Riemannian geometry). Cartan's ability to handle many other types of fibers and groups allows one to credit him with the first general idea of a fiber bundle, although he never defined it explicitly. This concept has become one of the most important in all fields of modern mathematics, chiefly in global differential geometry and in algebraic and differential topology. Cartan used it to formulate his definition of a connection, which is now used universally and has superseded previous attempts by several geometers, made after 1917, to find a type of "geometry" more general than the Riemannian model and perhaps better adapted to a description of the universe along the lines of general relativity.

Cartan showed how to use his concept of connection to obtain a much more elegant and simple presentation of Riemannian geometry. His chief contribution to the latter, however, was the discovery and study of the symmetric Riemann spaces, one of the few instances in which the initiator of a mathematical theory was also the one who brought it to its completion. Symmetric Riemann spaces may be defined in various ways, the simplest of which postulates the existence around each point of the space of a "symmetry" that is involutive, leaves the point fixed, and preserves distances. The unexpected fact discovered by Cartan is that it is possible to give a complete description of these spaces by means of the classification of the simple Lie groups; it should therefore not be surprising that in various areas of mathematics, such as automorphic functions and analytic number theory (apparently far removed from differential geometry), these spaces are playing a part that is becoming increasingly important.

== Alternative theory to general relativity ==
Cartan created a competitor theory of gravity also Einstein–Cartan theory.

== Publications ==
Cartan's papers have been collected in his Oeuvres complètes, 6 vols. (Paris, 1952–1955). Two excellent obituary notices are S. S. Chern and C. Chevalley, in Bulletin of the American Mathematical Society, 58 (1952); and J. H. C. Whitehead, in Obituary Notices of the Royal Society (1952).

- Cartan, Élie (1894), Sur la structure des groupes de transformations finis et continus, Thesis, Nony
- Cartan, Élie (1899), "Sur certaines expressions différentielles et le problème de Pfaff", Annales Scientifiques de l'École Normale Supérieure, Série 3 (in French), 16, Paris: Gauthier-Villars: 239–332, doi:10.24033/asens.467, ISSN 0012-9593, JFM 30.0313.04
- Leçons sur les invariants intégraux, Hermann, Paris, 1922
- Cartan, Élie (1925). "La géométrie des espaces de Riemann". Paris, Gauthier-Villars (Mémorial des sciences mathématiques, fasc. 9.) (in French): IV + 60. JFM 51.0566.01.
- Cartan, Elie (1946). Leçons sur la géométrie des espaces de Riemann (2ème. ed. rev. et aug. ed.). Paris: Gauthier-Villars. p. VIII, 378. ISBN 287647008X. Zbl 0060.38101.
- Cartan, Élie (1931). "La théorie des groupes finis et continus et l'analysis situs". Mémorial des sciences mathématiques (42): 68. JFM 56.0370.08.
- Cartan, Elie (1950). Leçons sur la géométrie projective complexe (2d ed.). Paris : Gauthier-Villars. p. VII + 325. Bibcode:1950lgpc.book.....C. MR 0041456. Zbl 0003.06801.
- La parallelisme absolu et la théorie unitaire du champ, Hermann, 1932
- Les Espaces Métriques Fondés sur la Notion d'Arie, Hermann, 1933
- La méthode de repère mobile, la théorie des groupes continus, et les espaces généralisés, 1935
- Leçons sur la théorie des espaces à connexion projective, Gauthiers-Villars, 1937
- La théorie des groupes finis et continus et la géométrie différentielle traitées par la méthode du repère mobile, Gauthiers-Villars, 1937
- Cartan, Élie (1981) [1938], The theory of spinors, New York: Dover Publications, ISBN 978-0-486-64070-9, MR 0631850
- Les systèmes différentiels extérieurs et leurs applications géométriques, Hermann, 1945
- Oeuvres complètes, 3 parts in 6 vols., Paris 1952 to 1955, reprinted by CNRS 1984:
  - Part 1: Groupes de Lie (in 2 vols.), 1952
  - Part 2, Vol. 1: Algèbre, formes différentielles, systèmes différentiels, 1953
  - Part 2, Vol. 2: Groupes finis, Systèmes différentiels, théories d'équivalence, 1953
  - Part 3, Vol. 1: Divers, géométrie différentielle, 1955
  - Part 3, Vol. 2: Géométrie différentielle, 1955
- Élie Cartan and Albert Einstein: Letters on Absolute Parallelism, 1929–1932 / original text in French & German, English trans. by Jules Leroy & Jim Ritter, ed. by Robert Debever, Princeton University Press, 1979

== See also ==
- Exterior derivative
- Integrability conditions for differential systems
- Isotropic line
- CAT(k) space
- Einstein – Cartan theory
- Hermitian symmetric space
- Moving frame
- Pseudogroup
- Pure spinor
- List of second-generation Mathematicians
