= 1934 =

1934 in various calendars
- Gregorian calendar: 1934; MCMXXXIV
- Ab urbe condita: 2687
- Armenian calendar: 1383; ԹՎ ՌՅՁԳ
- Assyrian calendar: 6684
- Baháʼí calendar: 90–91
- Balinese saka calendar: 1855–1856
- Bengali calendar: 1340–1341
- Berber calendar: 2884
- British Regnal year: 24 Geo. 5 – 25 Geo. 5
- Buddhist calendar: 2478
- Burmese calendar: 1296
- Byzantine calendar: 7442–7443
- Chinese calendar: 癸酉年 (Water Rooster); 4631 or 4424 — to — 甲戌年 (Wood Dog); 4632 or 4425
- Coptic calendar: 1650–1651
- Discordian calendar: 3100
- Ethiopian calendar: 1926–1927
- Hebrew calendar: 5694–5695
- Hindu calendars
- Vikram Samvat: 1990–1991
- Shaka Samvat: 1855–1856
- Kali Yuga: 5034–5035
- Holocene calendar: 11934
- Igbo calendar: 934–935
- Iranian calendar: 1312–1313
- Islamic calendar: 1352–1353
- Japanese calendar: Shōwa 9 (昭和９年)
- Javanese calendar: 1864–1865
- Juche calendar: 23
- Julian calendar: Gregorian minus 13 days
- Korean calendar: 4267
- Minguo calendar: ROC 23 民國23年
- Nanakshahi calendar: 466
- Thai solar calendar: 2476–2477
- Tibetan calendar: ཆུ་མོ་བྱ་ལོ་ (female Water-Bird); 2060 or 1679 or 907 — to — ཤིང་ཕོ་ཁྱི་ལོ་ (male Wood-Dog); 2061 or 1680 or 908

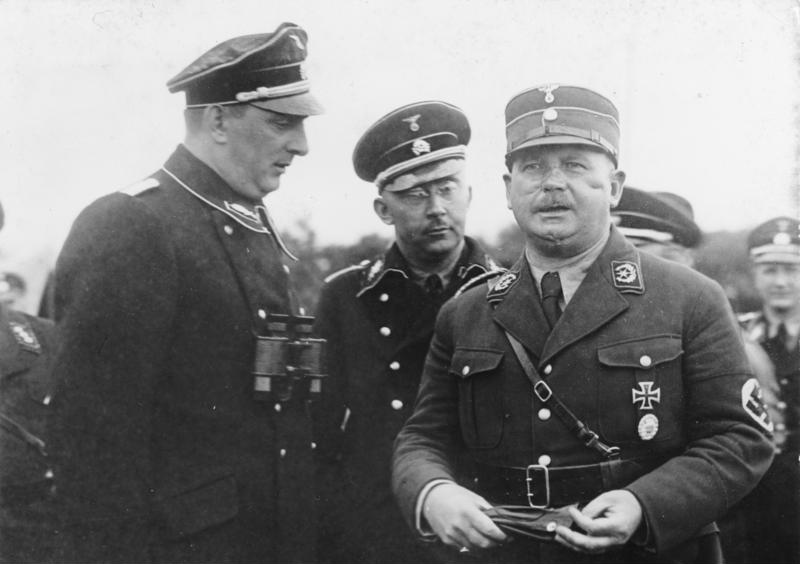
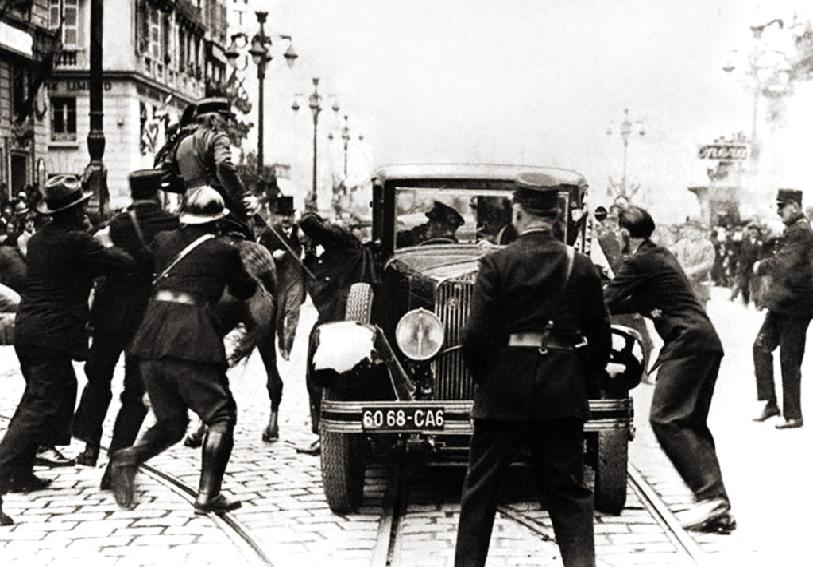
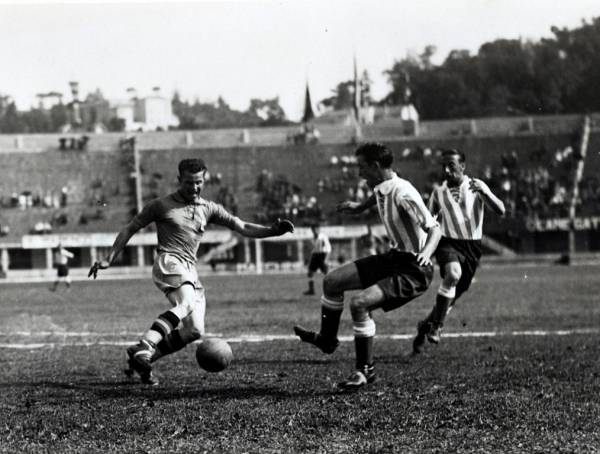
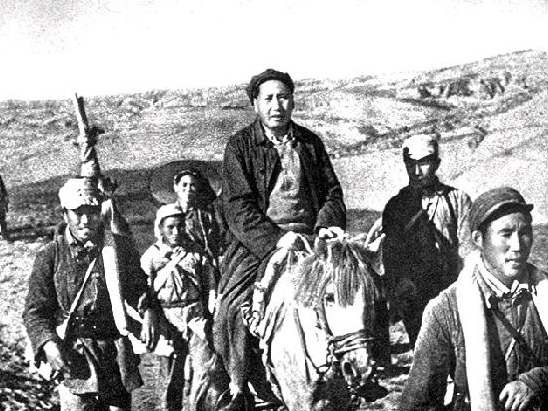
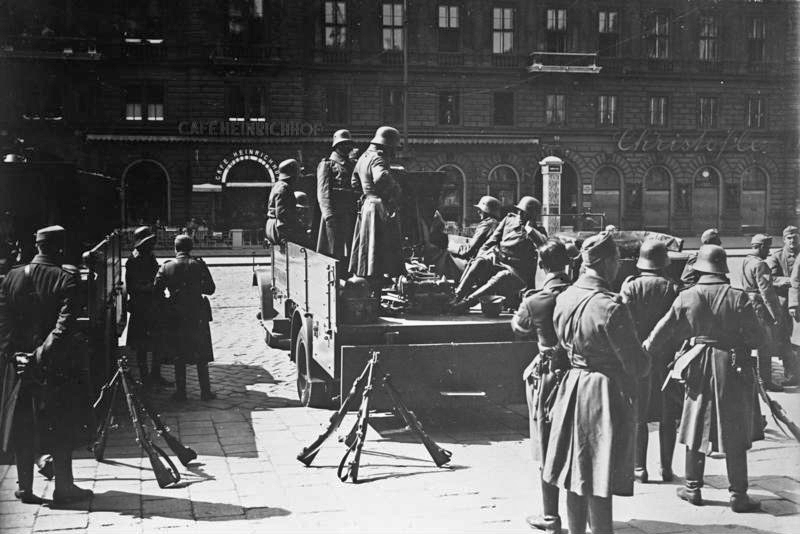
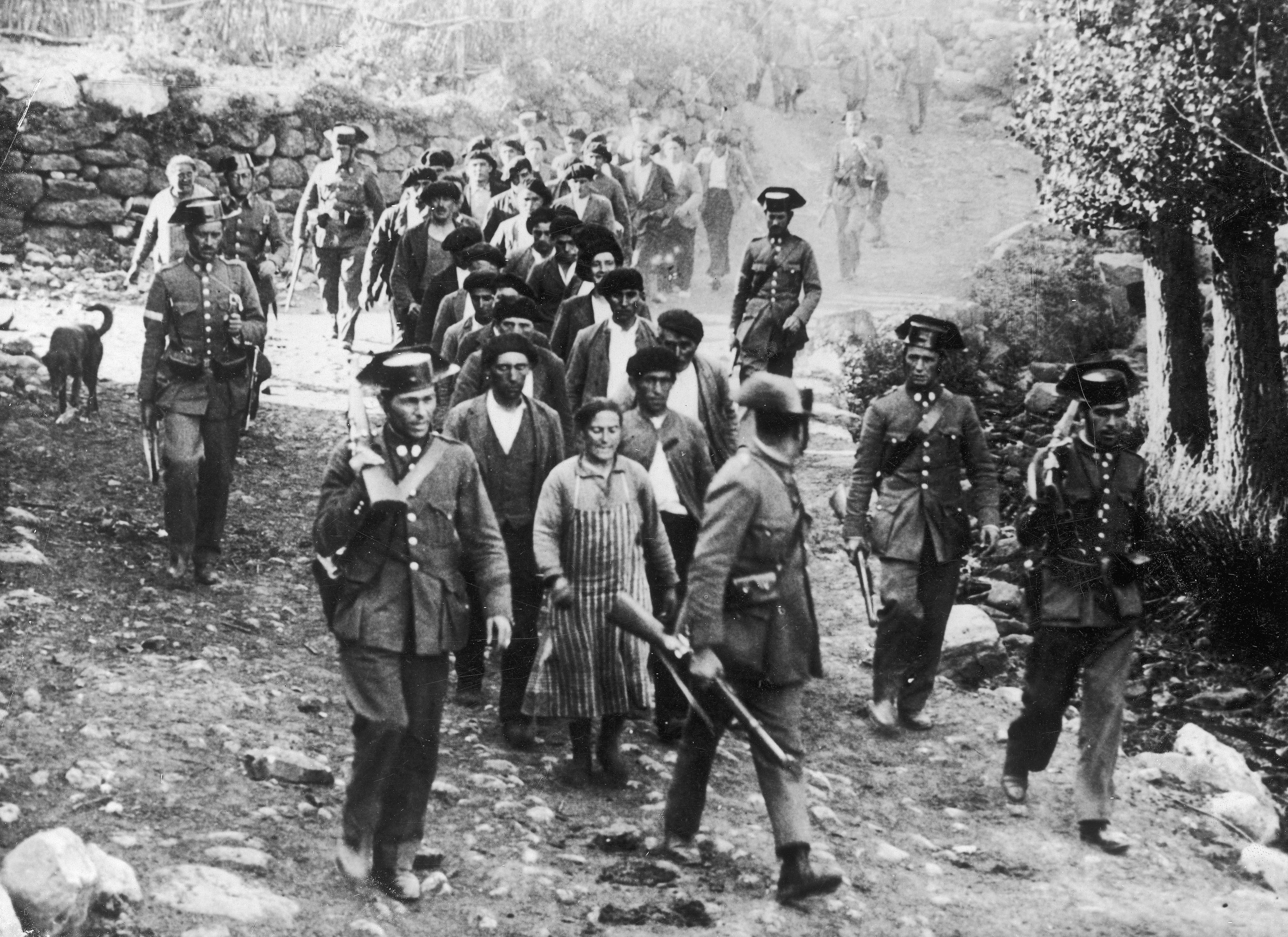
From top to bottom, left to right:
- The Night of the Long Knives sees Hitler purge SA leaders and rivals, solidifying his dictatorship;
- The assassination of Alexander I of Yugoslavia shocks Europe as the king and French Foreign Minister Barthou are killed;
- The 1934 FIFA World Cup in Italy ends with the hosts defeating Czechoslovakia, boosting Mussolini’s propaganda;
- The Long March begins as Chinese Communists retreat across thousands of kilometers from Nationalist forces;
- The Austrian Civil War erupts as Social Democrats clash with the Austrofascist government, ending in authoritarian consolidation;
- The Revolution of 1934 sparks uprisings across Spain by workers and leftist factions, foreshadowing wider political conflict.

1934 (MCMXXXIV) was a common year starting on Monday of the Gregorian calendar, the 1934th year of the Common Era (CE) and Anno Domini (AD) designations, the 934th year of the 2nd millennium, the 34th year of the 20th century, and the 5th year of the 1930s decade.

== Events ==
=== January–February ===
- January 1 – The International Telecommunication Union, a specialist agency of the League of Nations, is established.
- January 15 – The 8.0 M_{w} Nepal–Bihar earthquake strikes Nepal and Bihar with a maximum Mercalli intensity of XI (Extreme), killing an estimated 6,000–10,700 people.
- February 6 – French political crisis: The French far-right leagues rally in front of the Palais Bourbon, in an attempted coup d'état against the Third Republic.
- February 9
  - Gaston Doumergue forms a new government in France.
  - Greece, Romania, Turkey and Yugoslavia form the Balkan Pact.
- February 12–15 – Austrian Civil War: The Fatherland Front consolidates its power in a series of clashes across the country.
- February 16 – The Commission of Government is sworn in, as a form of direct rule for the Dominion of Newfoundland.
- February 21 – Augusto César Sandino is assassinated in Managua, by the National Guard.
- February 23 – King Leopold III of Belgium succeeds to the throne, following the death (February 17) of his father King Albert I.

=== March–April ===
- March 1 – Manchukuo, the Japanese puppet state in Manchuria established in 1932, proclaimed a monarchy under Puyi.
- March 12 – Prime Minister Konstantin Päts stages a self-coup by declaring a state of emergency in Estonia, with the approval of the parliament, beginning the country's Era of Silence.
- March 13 – John Dillinger and his gang rob the First National Bank in Mason City, Iowa, United States, stealing $52,000.
- March 20 – The Great Hakodate Fire kills at least 2,166 people in southern Hokkaido, Japan.
- March 22 – The first Masters Tournament in golf opens at Augusta National Golf Club in Georgia (United States).
- March 24 – The Tydings–McDuffie Act is passed, allowing the Philippines a greater degree of self-government from the United States.
- April 21 – The "surgeon's photograph" of the Loch Ness Monster, taken in Scotland by London gynaecologist Robert Kenneth Wilson and in 1994 admitted to be a hoax, is published in the Daily Mail London national newspaper.

=== May–June ===
- May 1 – The May Constitution of 1934 heralds the beginning of the Austrofascist Federal State of Austria.
- May 15 – Kārlis Ulmanis establishes an authoritarian government in Latvia.
- May 19 – Kimon Georgiev stages a coup d'état in Bulgaria.
- May 23 – American outlaws Bonnie and Clyde are ambushed and killed by police in Bienville Parish, Louisiana.
- May 28 – Near Callander, Ontario, Canada, the Dionne quintuplets are born to Oliva and Elzire Dionne, becoming the first quintuplets to survive infancy.
- May 31 – The Barmen Declaration, largely drafted by Karl Barth, is signed by Christians in Nazi Germany who are opposed to the pro-Nazi German Christian movement.
- June 9 – Donald Duck makes his film debut in Walt Disney's Silly Symphony cartoon The Wise Little Hen.
- June 10 – Italy beats Czechoslovakia 2–1 after extra time, to win the 1934 World Cup, staged in Italy.
- June 14 – Adolf Hitler and Benito Mussolini meet for the first time, at the Venice Biennale.
- June 18 – The Indian Reorganization Act is enacted.
- June 27 – Imam Yahya of Yemen and Ibn Saud of Saudi Arabia conclude a peace treaty.
- June 30 – July 2 – Night of the Long Knives in Germany: Nazis purge the Sturmabteilung (SA), the left-wing Strasserist faction of the Nazi Party, and prominent conservative anti-Nazis, in a series of political murders.
- June 30 – The Nazi Party SA camp Oranienburg becomes a national camp, taken over by the Schutzstaffel (SS).

=== July–August ===
- July 1 – The Hays Code begins to be strictly enforced in the Hollywood film industry, lasting until 1968.
- July 13 – Hitler gives a speech to the Reichstag, justifying his purge.
- July 25 – July Putsch: Austrian Nazis assassinate chancellor Engelbert Dollfuss, during a failed coup attempt.
- August 2 – Adolf Hitler becomes Führer of Germany, or head of state combined with that of Chancellor, following the death of President Paul von Hindenburg.
- August 8 – The Wehrmacht swears a personal oath of loyalty to Adolf Hitler.
- August 15 – The United States Marine Corps leaves Haiti.
- August 19 – 1934 German referendum: In a referendum, 90% of the German population approves of Hitler's assumption of presidential powers, as Führer and Reichskanzler.

=== September–October ===
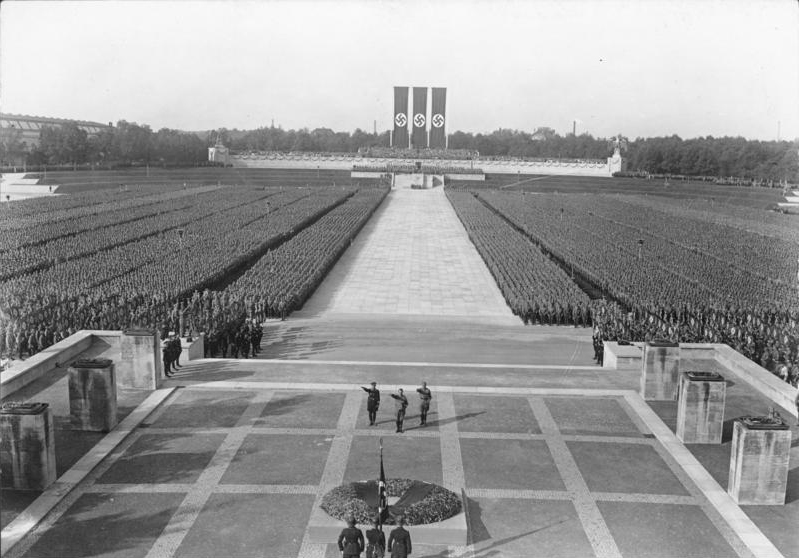
Nuremberg Rally of 1934

- September 5–10 – The 6th Nuremberg Rally is staged by the German Nazi Party.
- September 8 – Off the New Jersey coast, a fire aboard the passenger liner SS Morro Castle kills 134 people.
- September 15 – 1934 Australian federal election: Joseph Lyons' UAP government is re-elected with a decreased majority, defeating the Labor Party, led by former Prime Minister James Scullin. Consequently, Lyons is forced to resume the Coalition with the Country Party, and include them in his government. Scullin steps down from the Labor leadership shortly after; he is replaced by future Prime Minister John Curtin.
- September 19
  - The Soviet Union joins the League of Nations.
  - Bruno Richard Hauptmann is arrested in connection with the Lindbergh kidnapping case in the U.S.
- September 21 – The Muroto typhoon in Honshū, Japan kills 3,036 people, and destroys the temple, schools, and other buildings in Osaka.
- September 22 – A gas explosion at Gresford Colliery in Wrexham, north-east Wales, kills 266 miners and rescuers.
- September 28 – Afghanistan joins the League of Nations.
- October 2 – A typhoon in Osaka and Kyoto, Japan, kills 1,660, injures 5,400, and destroys the rice harvest.
- October 6 – Events of October the 6th: the President of Catalonia, Lluís Companys, declares the Catalan State of the Spanish Federal Republic, but Spanish troops swiftly crush the Catalan forces, and arrest him and the members of the Catalan government. The autonomy of Catalonia is suspended until 1936.
- October 9 – King Alexander of Yugoslavia is assassinated, while French foreign minister Louis Barthou is accidentally killed by the French police, during the king's state visit in Marseille.
- October 16 – The Long March of the People's Liberation Army of the Chinese Communist Party begins.
- October 20–November 3 – Charles Kingsford Smith makes the first eastward crossing of the Pacific Ocean, from his native Brisbane, Australia, to San Francisco, in the Lockheed Altair Lady Southern Cross. The November 3 Hawaii–San Francisco leg is the first eastward flight from Hawaii to North America.
- October 20–November 5 – The MacRobertson Air Race is flown from RAF Mildenhall in England to Melbourne, Australia, to celebrate the centenary of the state of Victoria. The overall winner is the British de Havilland DH.88 Comet G-ACSS Grosvenor House, flown by C. W. A. Scott and Tom Campbell Black.

=== November–December ===
- November 6 – Attempted exclusion of Egon Kisch from Australia begins.
- November 23 – An Anglo-Ethiopian boundary commission in the Ogaden discovers an Italian garrison at Walwal, which lies well within Ethiopian territory. This encounter leads to the Abyssinia Crisis.
- November 27 – Daniel Salamanca Urey, President of Bolivia, is deposed in a military coup, and replaced by José Luis Tejada Sorzano.
- December 5 – Abyssinia Crisis: Ethiopian and Italian troops exchange gunfire. Reported casualties for the Ethiopians are 150, and for the Italians 50.
- December 27 – Persia becomes Iran.
- December 29 – Japan renounces the Washington Naval Treaty of 1922 and the London Naval Treaty of 1930.

=== Date unknown ===
- Winter – Tadj ol-Molouk, Empress consort of Iran, and her daughters appear publicly in Tehran without a veil, leading to its abolition in the country.
- Abidjan becomes the capital of the French colony of Ivory Coast.
- The sonoluminescence effect is discovered, at the University of Cologne.
- The Australian frontier wars end, after 146 years.
- The Yomiuri Giants, a successful professional baseball club in Japan, is founded in Tokyo.
- The Regional Workers' Center of Paraguay dissolves due to the ongoing Chaco War.

== Births ==
=== January ===
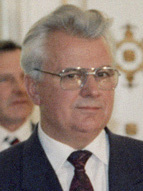
Leonid Kravchuk

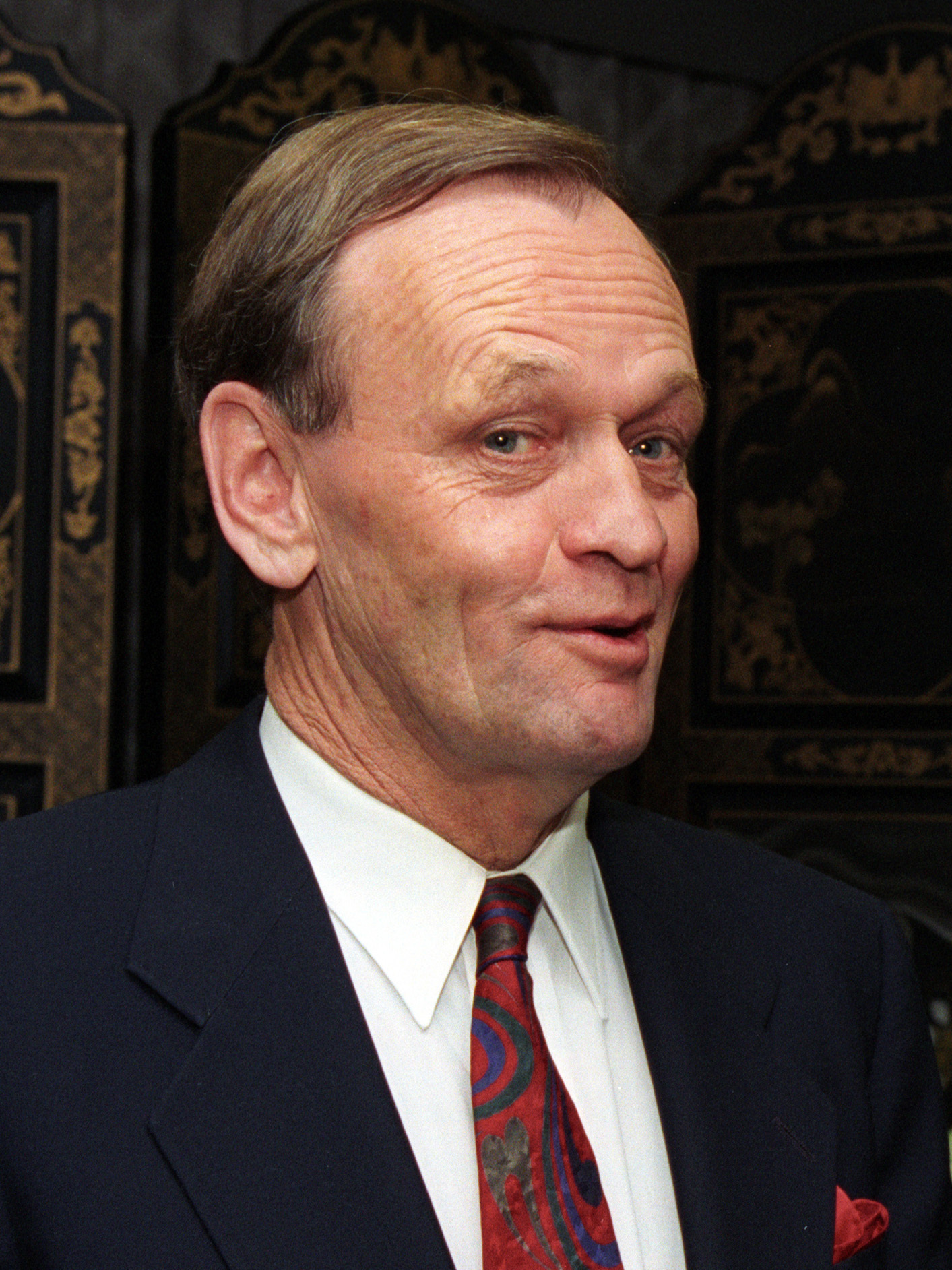
Jean Chrétien

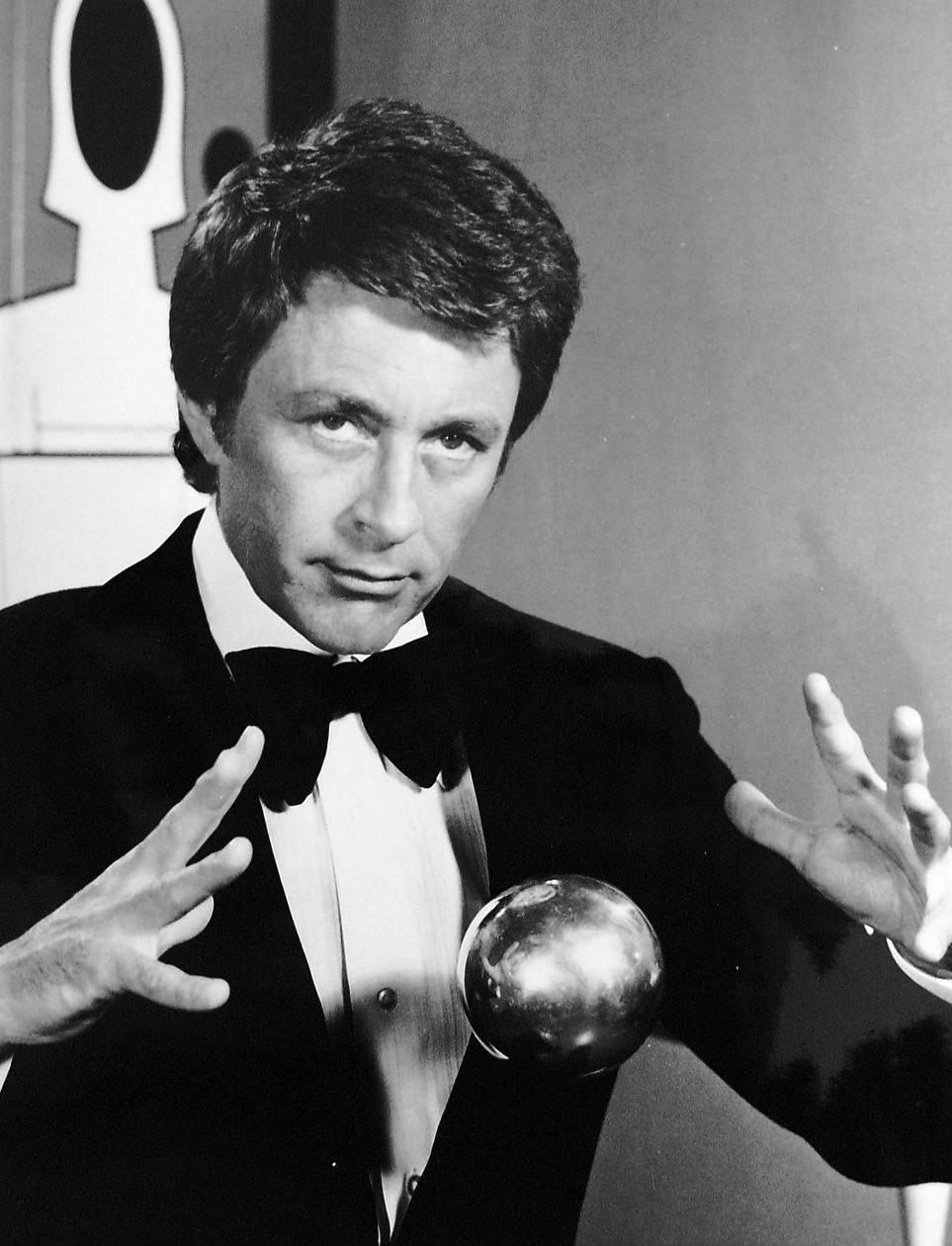
Bill Bixby

- January 2 – Wael Zwaiter, Palestinian writer (d. 1972)
- January 4
  - Rudolf Schuster, 2nd President of Slovakia
  - Zurab Tsereteli, Georgian-Russian painter, sculptor, architect (d. 2025)
- January 5 – Eddy Pieters Graafland, Dutch football goalkeeper (d. 2020)
- January 7
  - Charles Jenkins, American sprinter
  - Tassos Papadopoulos, Cypriot politician, 5th President of Cyprus (d. 2008)
- January 10 – Leonid Kravchuk, President of Ukraine (d. 2022)
- January 11 – Jean Chrétien, 20th Prime Minister of Canada
- January 14
  - Richard Briers, English actor (d. 2013)
  - Pierre Darmon, French tennis player
- January 16 – Marilyn Horne, American mezzo-soprano
- January 17 – Cedar Walton, American jazz pianist (d. 2013)
- January 18 – Raymond Briggs, British writer and illustrator (d. 2022)
- January 20 – Tom Baker, British actor
- January 21 – Ann Wedgeworth, American actress (d. 2017)
- January 24 – Stanisław Grochowiak, Polish poet and dramatist (d. 1976)
- January 27 – Édith Cresson, Prime Minister of France
- January 30 – Tammy Grimes, American actress (d. 2016)
- January 31 – Eva Mozes Kor, Romanian Holocaust survivor and author (d. 2019)

=== February ===
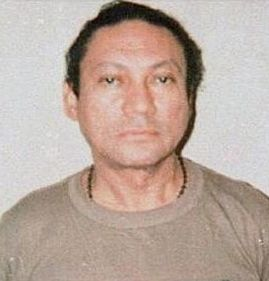
Manuel Noriega

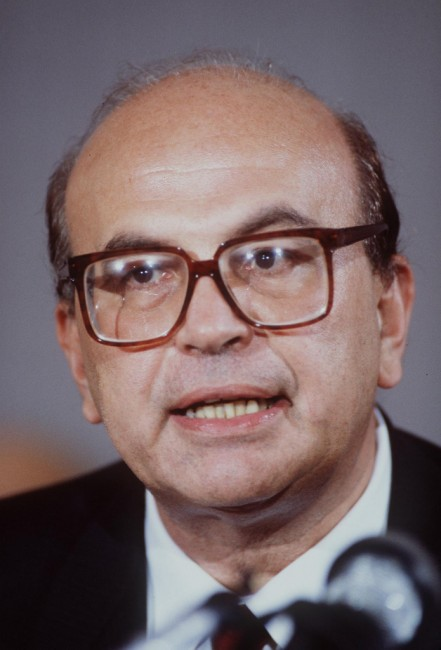
Bettino Craxi

- February 5 – Hank Aaron, American baseball player (d. 2021)
- February 7 – Eddie Fenech Adami, 10th Prime Minister of Malta and 7th President of Malta
- February 10 – Fleur Adcock, New Zealand poet (d. 2024)
- February 11
  - Manuel Noriega, Panamanian military dictator (d. 2017)
  - John Surtees, British racing driver (d. 2017)
- February 12
  - Anne Krueger, American economist
  - Annette Crosbie, Scottish actress
- February 13 – George Segal, American actor (d. 2021)
- February 14 – Florence Henderson, American actress, singer and television personality (d. 2016)
- February 15 – Niklaus Wirth, Swiss computer scientist (d. 2024)
- February 17
  - Sir Alan Bates, British actor (d. 2003)
  - Barry Humphries, Australian actor, comedian (d. 2023)
- February 18
  - Anna Maria Ferrero, Italian actress (d. 2018)
  - Paco Rabanne, Spanish fashion designer (d. 2023)
- February 21 – Rue McClanahan, American actress (d. 2010)
- February 24
  - Bettino Craxi, Prime Minister of Italy (d. 2000)
  - Renata Scotto, Italian soprano (d. 2023)
  - Bingu wa Mutharika, Malawian President, economist (d. 2012)
- February 27 – Ralph Nader, American consumer activist and presidential candidate

=== March ===
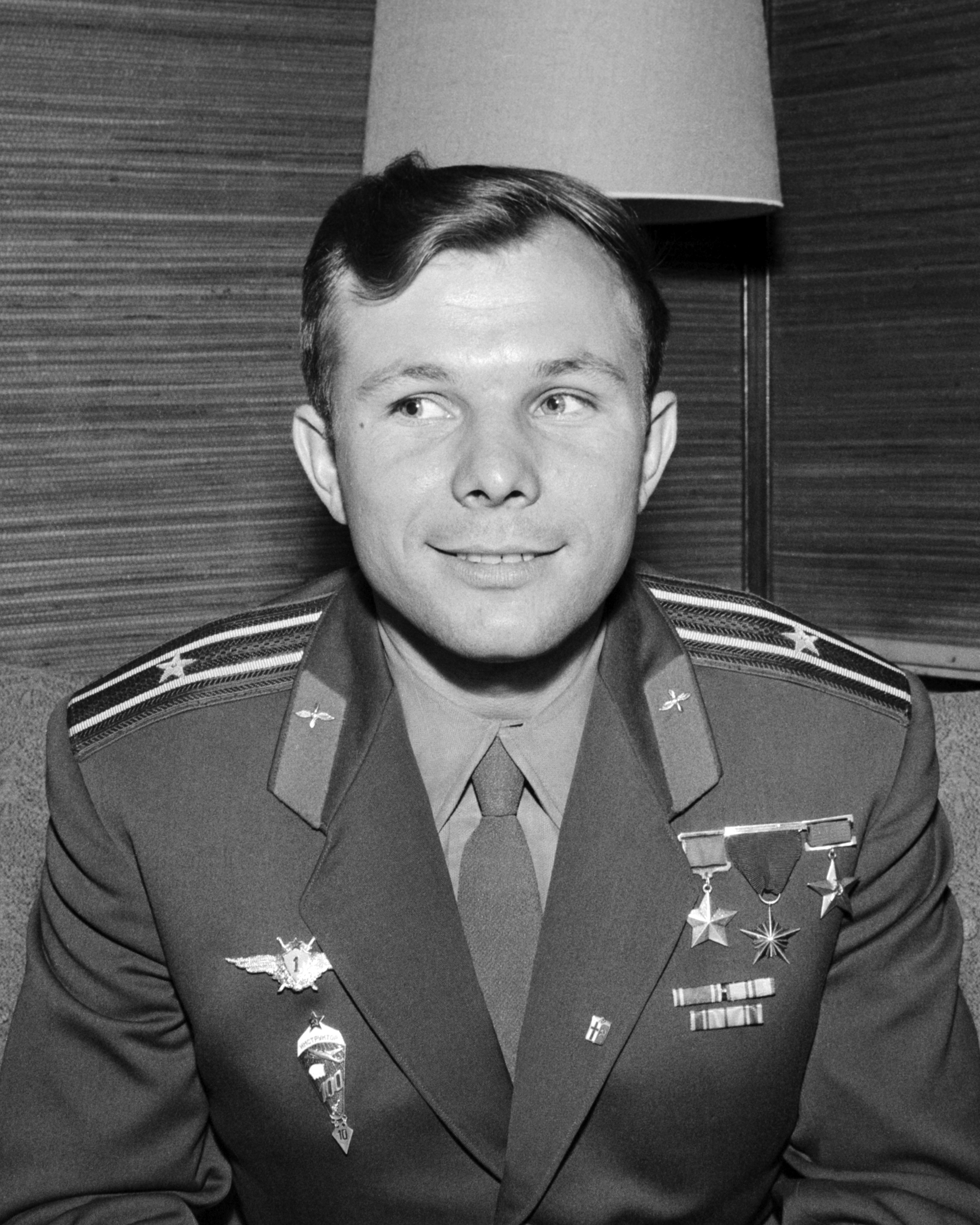
Yuri Gagarin

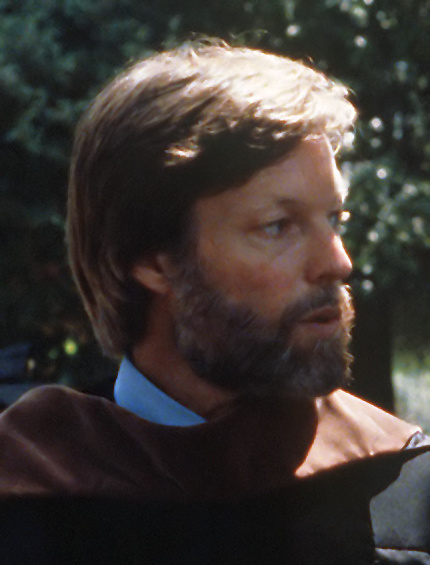
Richard Chamberlain

Shirley Jones

- March 1 – Joan Hackett, American actress (d. 1983)
- March 4 – Anne Haney, American actress (d. 2001)
- March 5 – Daniel Kahneman, Israeli economist and Nobel laureate (d. 2024)
- March 6 – Milton Diamond, American sexologist and professor of anatomy and reproductive biology (d. 2024)
- March 9
  - Yuri Gagarin, Russian cosmonaut, first human in space (d. 1968)
  - Joyce Van Patten, American actress
- March 14
  - Eugene Cernan, American astronaut (d. 2017)
  - Dionigi Tettamanzi, Italian cardinal (d. 2017)
- March 16 – Ray Hnatyshyn, Canadian statesman, 24th Governor General of Canada (d. 2002)
- March 18 – Charley Pride, American country musician (d. 2020)
- March 20 – David Malouf, Australian writer (d. 2026)
- March 23 – Ludvig Faddeev, Russian physicist and mathematician (d. 2017)
- March 25
  - Johnny Burnette, American rockabilly singer-songwriter and musician (d. 1964)
  - Gloria Steinem, American feminist (d. 2026)
- March 26 – Alan Arkin, American actor (d. 2023)
- March 30 – Hans Hollein, Austrian architect and designer (d. 2014)
- March 31
  - Richard Chamberlain, American actor (d. 2025)
  - Shirley Jones, American singer and actress
  - John D. Loudermilk, American singer-songwriter (d. 2016)
  - Carlo Rubbia, Italian Nobel physicist
  - Kamala Surayya, Indian poet and author (d. 2009)

=== April ===
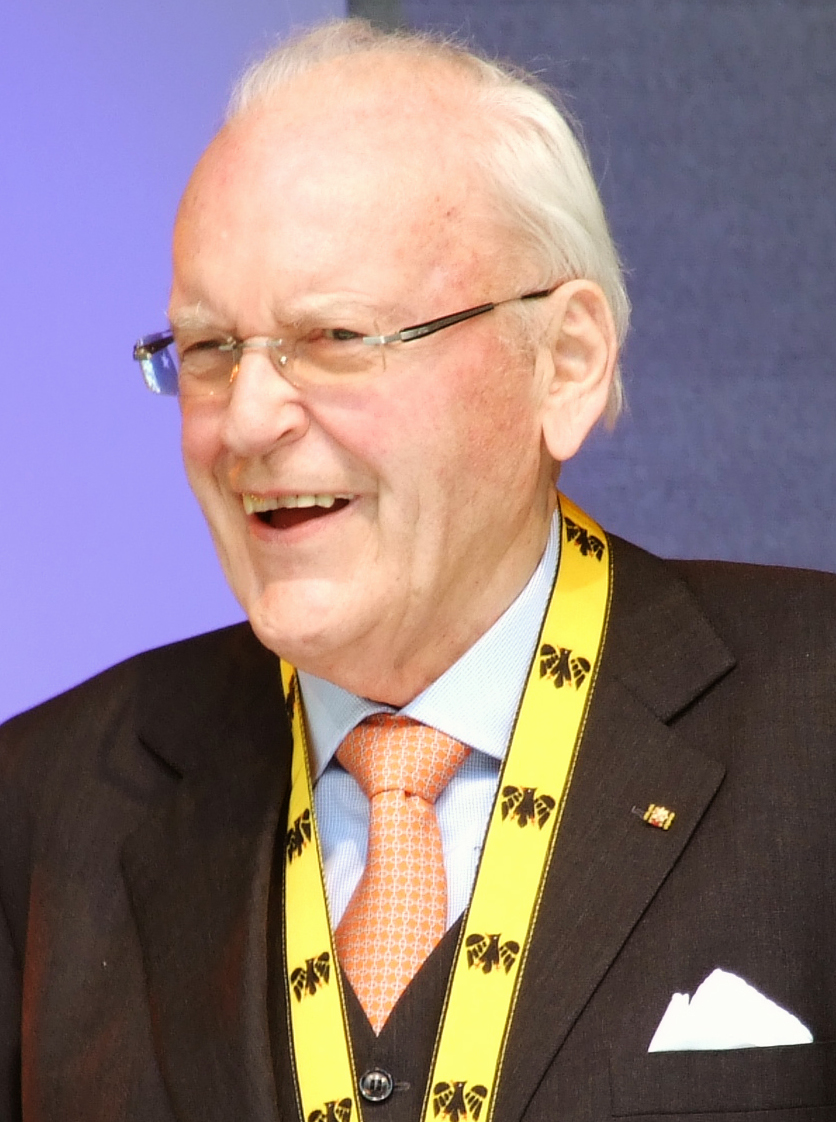
Roman Herzog

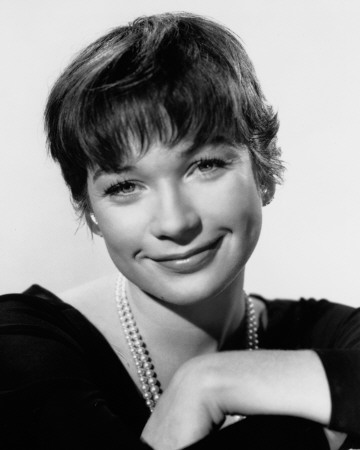
Shirley MacLaine

- April 1
  - Vladimir Posner, Russian journalist
  - Pascal Rakotomavo, 10th prime minister of Madagascar (d. 2010)
- April 2 – Paul Cohen, American mathematician (d. 2007)
- April 3
  - Pina Pellicer, Mexican actress (d. 1964)
  - Jane Goodall, British zoologist (d. 2025)
- April 5 – Roman Herzog, 9th President of Germany (d. 2017)
- April 6 – Anton Geesink, Dutch 10th-dan judoka (d. 2010)
- April 11 – Mark Strand, Canadian-born American poet (d. 2014)
- April 18 – James Drury, American actor (d. 2020)
- April 20 – John Malecela, 6th prime minister of Tanzania
- April 24
  - Jayakanthan, Tamil writer (d. 2015)
  - Shirley MacLaine, American actress, dancer, writer
- April 29 – Pedro Verona Rodrigues Pires, President of Cape Verde

=== May ===
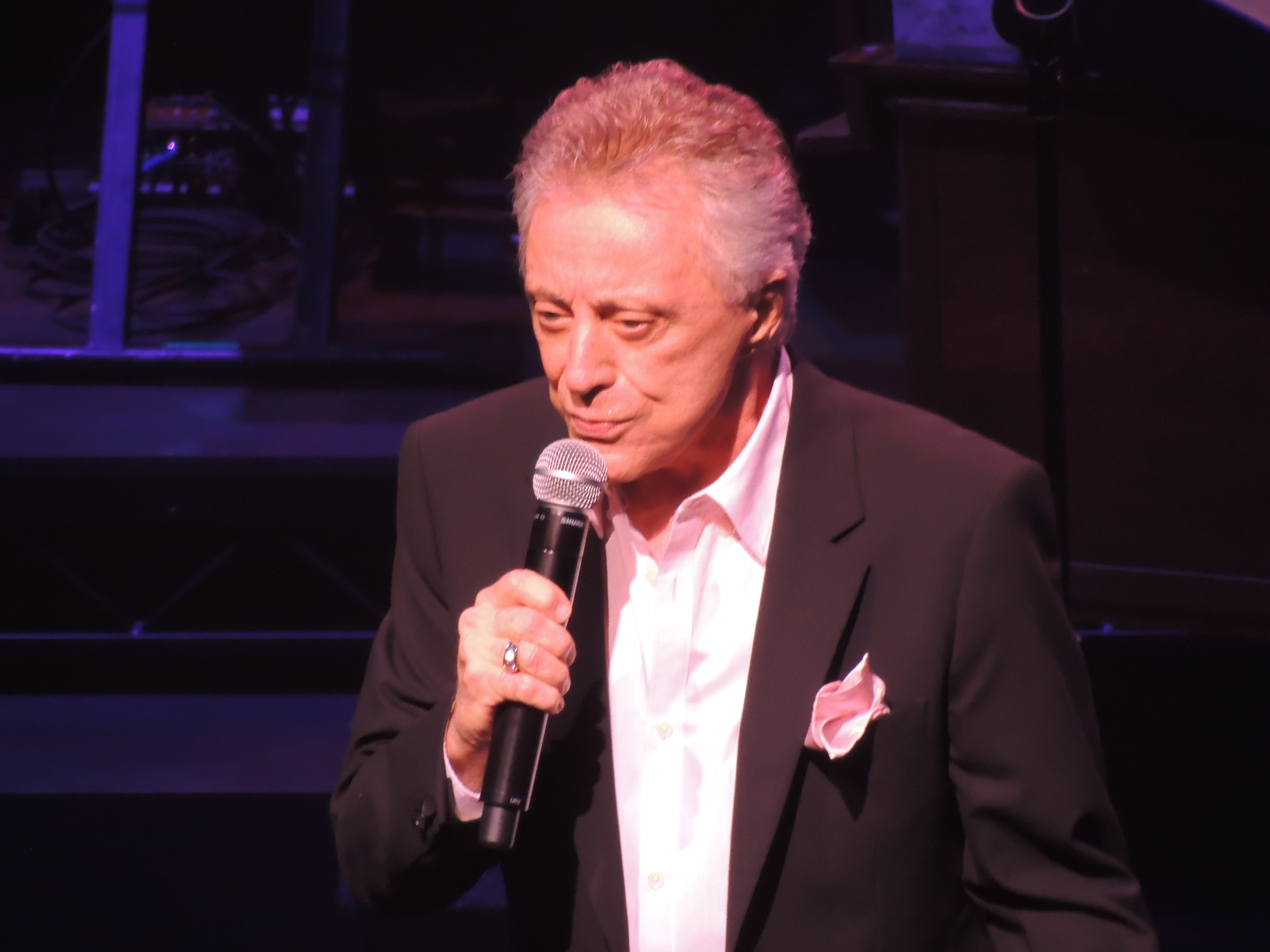
Frankie Valli

- May 3
  - Henry Cooper, British boxer (d. 2011)
  - Frankie Valli, American musician (The Four Seasons)
- May 4 – Tatiana Samoilova, Russian actress (d. 2014)
- May 9
  - Alan Bennett, British playwright, screenwriter, actor, and author
  - Lee Hong-koo, South Korean politician, 26th Prime Minister of South Korea (d. 2026)
- May 21 – Bengt I. Samuelsson, Swedish biochemist, recipient of the Nobel Prize in Physiology or Medicine (d. 2024)
- May 23 – Robert Moog, American inventor of the synthesizer (d. 2005)
- May 27 – Harlan Ellison, American writer (d. 2018)
- May 29 – Nihal Seneviratne, Sri Lankan civil servant, secretary general of the Parliament of Sri Lanka (1981–1994) (d. 2026)
- May 30 – Alexei Leonov, Russian cosmonaut (d. 2019)
- May 31 – Bhagwatikumar Sharma, Indian author and journalist (d. 2018)

=== June ===
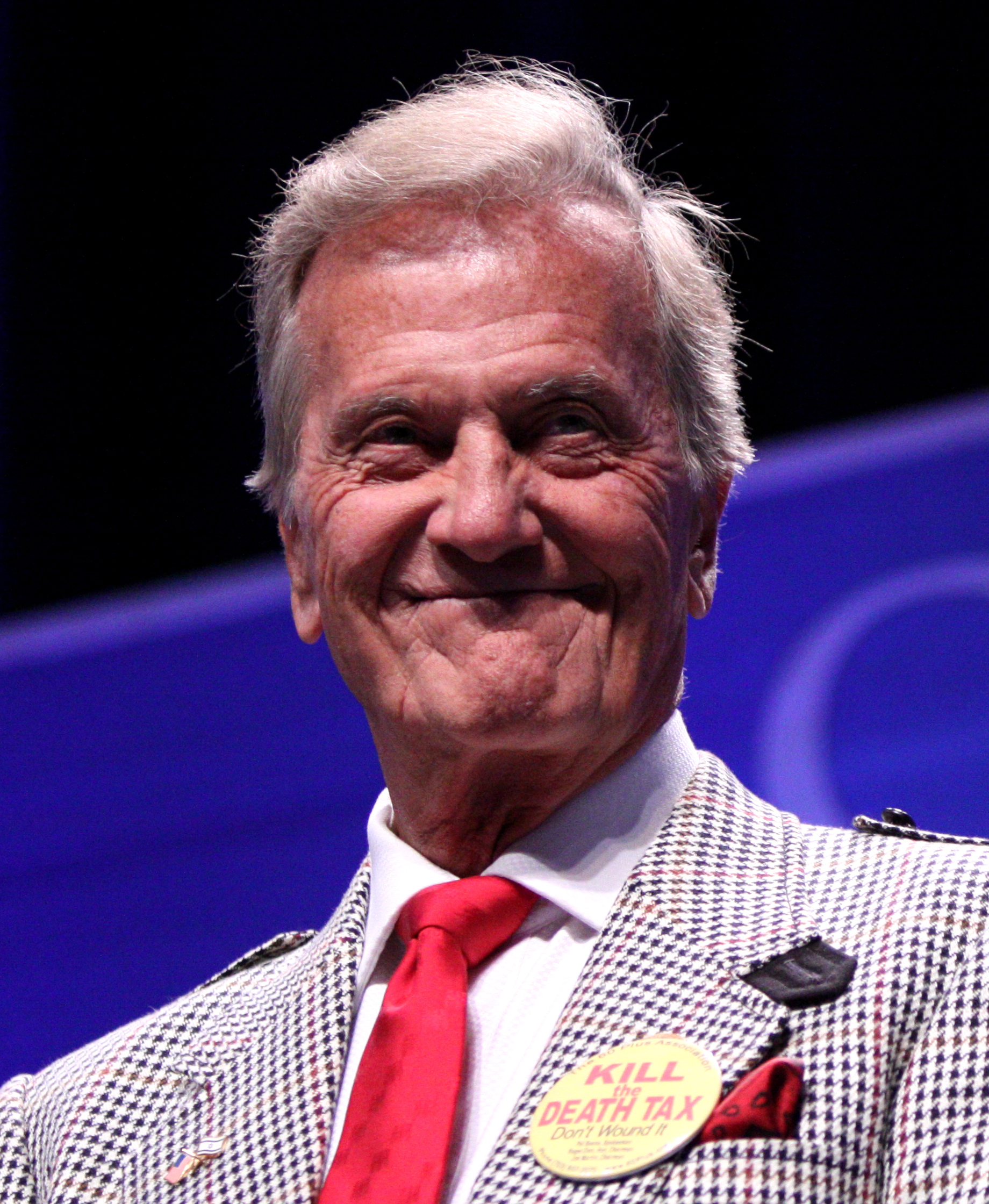
Pat Boone

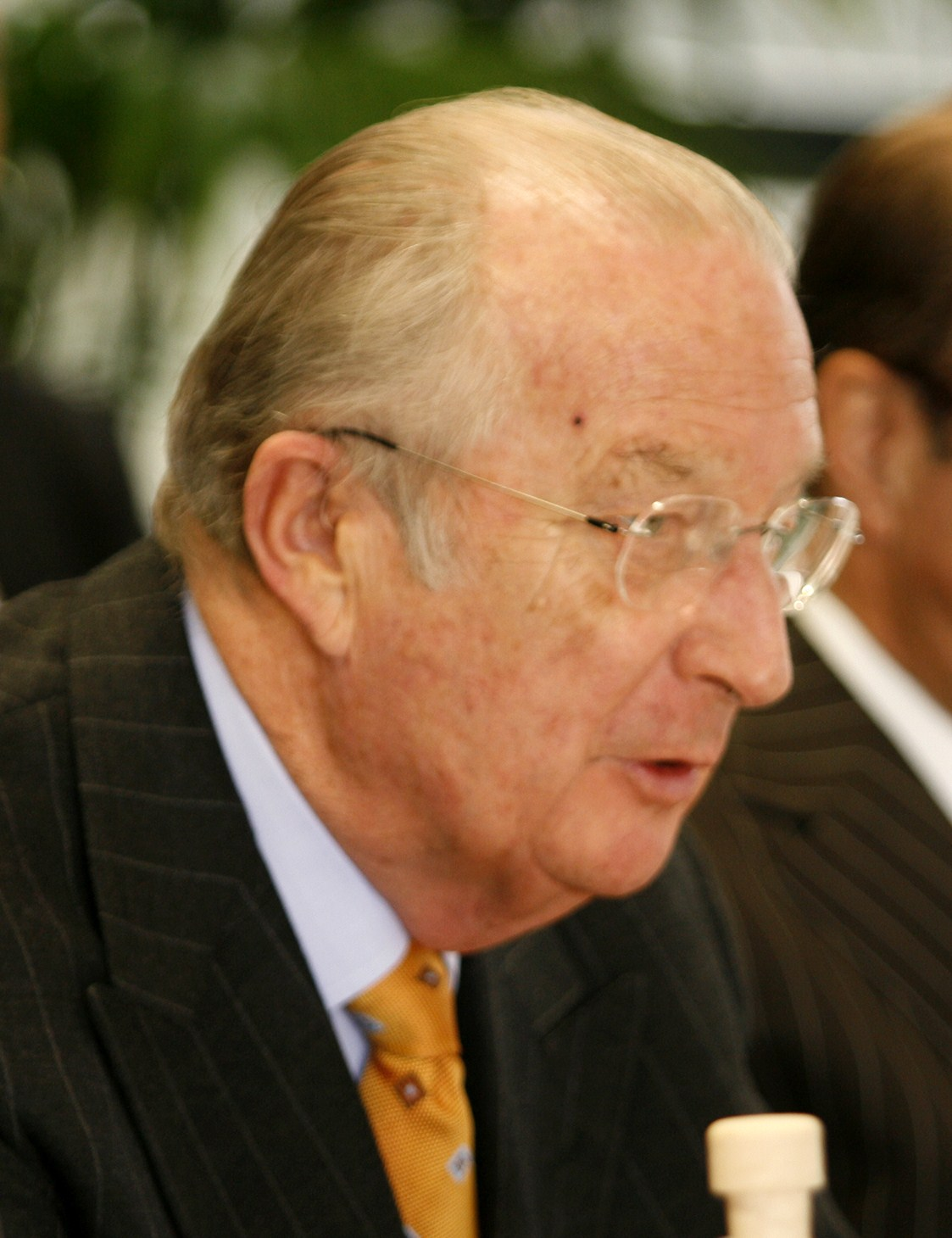
Albert II of Belgium

- June 1 – Pat Boone, American actor and singer
- June 4 – Dame Daphne Sheldrick, Kenyan conservationist and author (d. 2018)
- June 5 – Chennupati Vidya, Indian politician and social worker (d. 2018)
- June 6 – King Albert II of Belgium
- June 7
  - Philippe Entremont, French concert pianist.
  - Koloa Talake, 7th prime minister of Tuvalu (d. 2008)
- June 9 – Jackie Wilson, American singer (d. 1984)
- June 11 – Henrik, Prince Consort of Denmark, French-born consort of the Danish monarch (d. 2018)
- June 15
  - Rubén Aguirre, Mexican actor and comedian (d. 2016)
  - Dame Eileen Atkins, British actress
- June 16
  - William F. Sharpe, American economist and Nobel laureate
  - Bill Cobbs, American actor (d. 2024)
- June 19 – Désiré Rakotoarijaona, 4th prime minister of Madagascar
- June 23 – Virbhadra Singh, Indian politician (d. 2021)
- June 28 – Michael Artin, American mathematician
- June 29 – Susan George, American and French political, social scientist, activist and writer (d. 2026)
- June 30 – C. N. R. Rao, Indian chemist

=== July ===
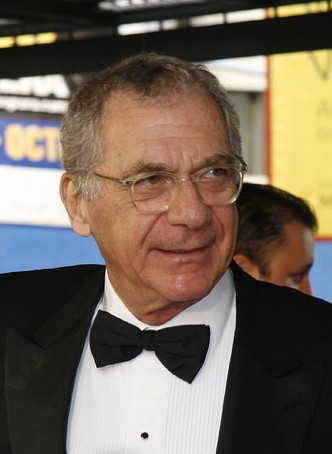
Sydney Pollack

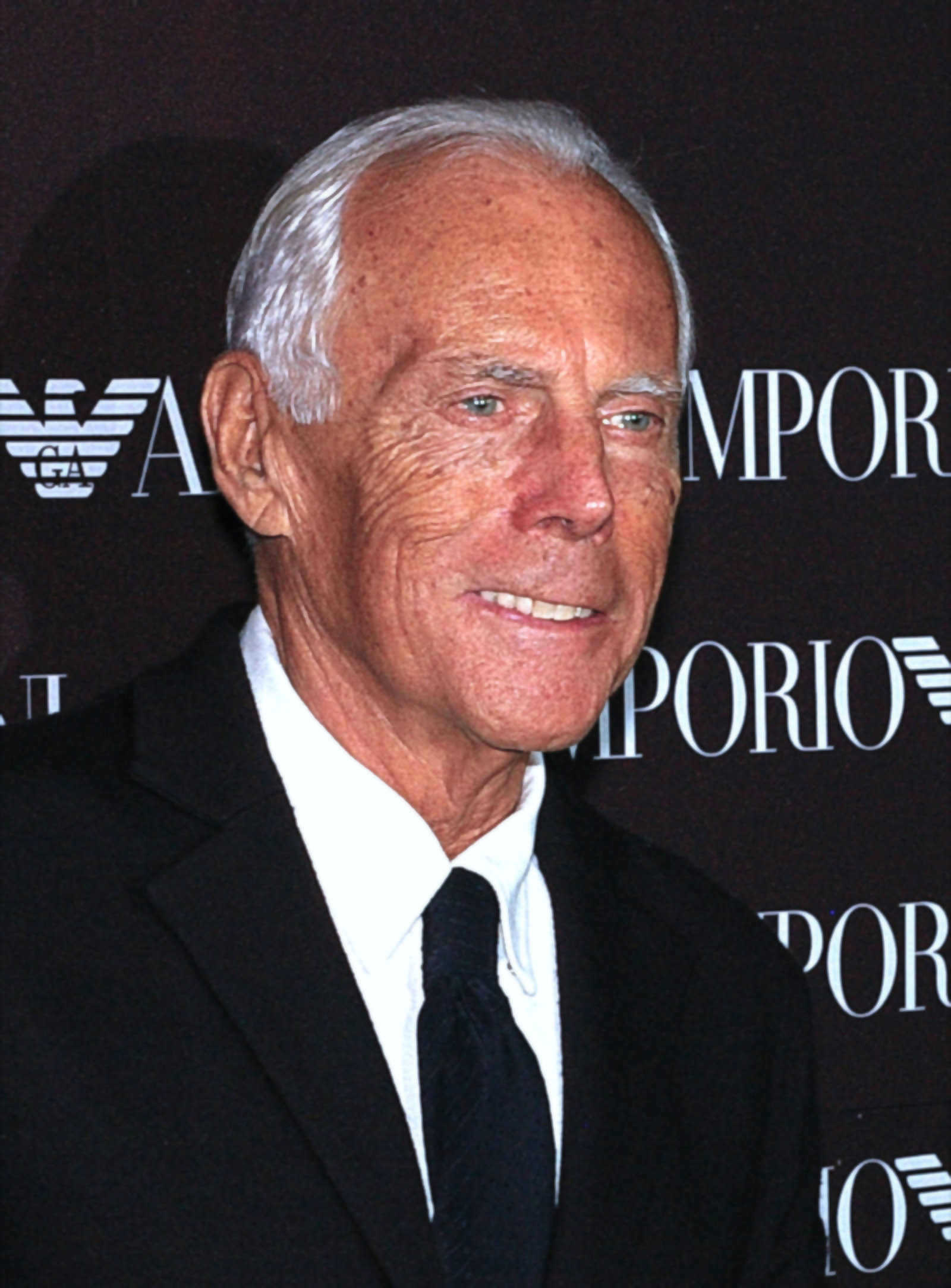
Giorgio Armani

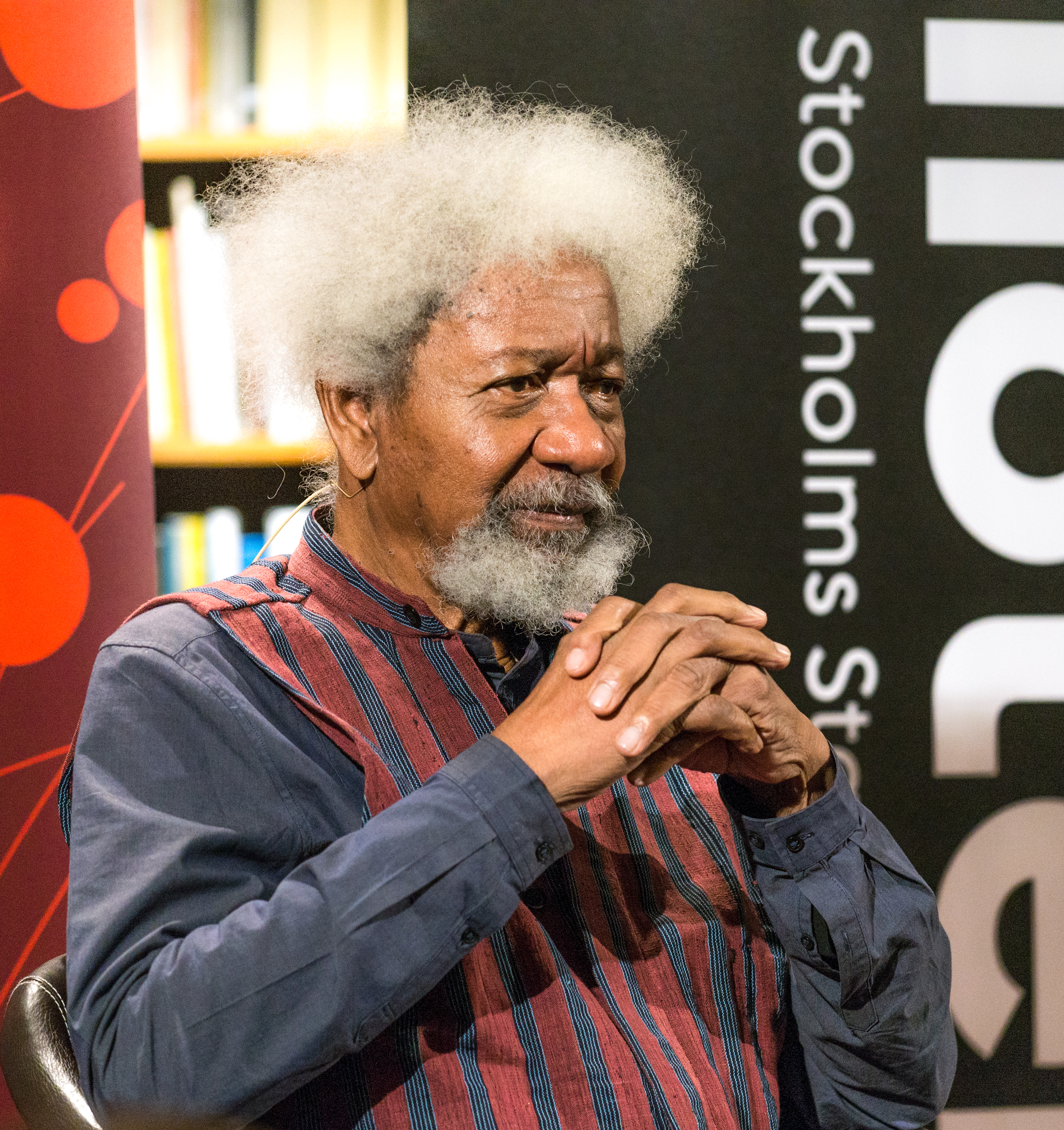
Wole Soyinka

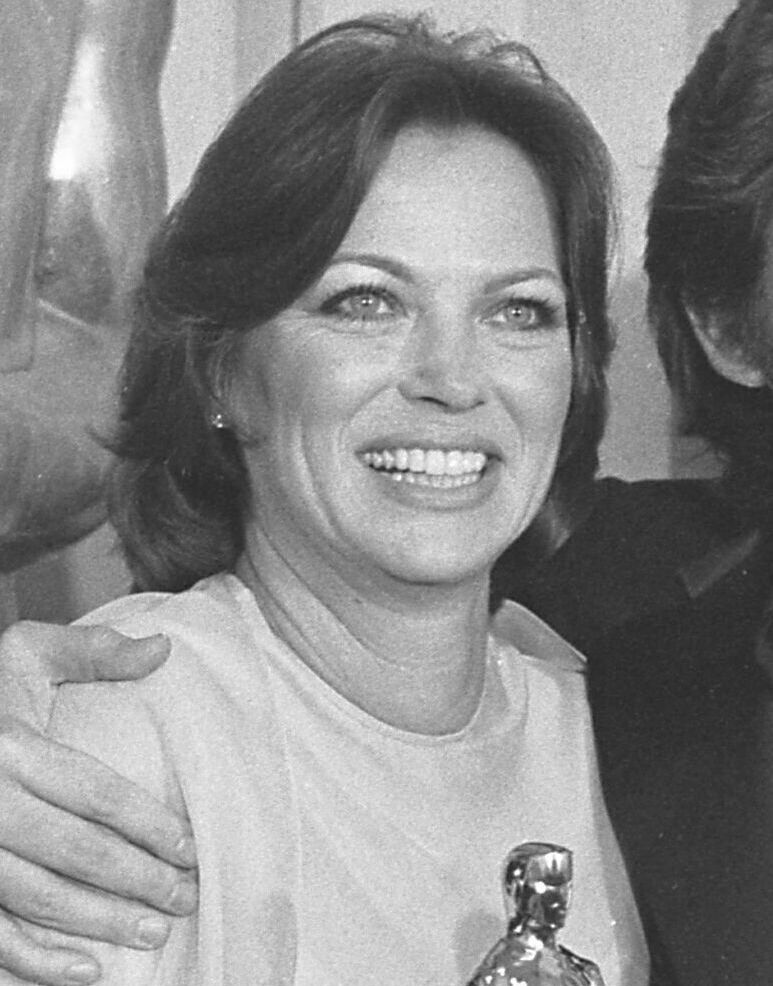
Louise Fletcher

- July 1
  - Ilselil Larsen, Danish actress (d. 2025)
  - Sydney Pollack, American film director (d. 2008)
- July 3 – Stefan Abadzhiev, Bulgarian footballer (d. 2024)
- July 5 – Adriana Roel, Mexican actress (d. 2022)
- July 7
  - Raphael Owor, Ugandan physician, pathologist, academic and medical researcher
  - Kedarnath Singh, Indian poet (d. 2018)
- July 8
  - Fred Stewart, Canadian politician (d. 2022)
  - Ole Lund, Norwegian barrister and industrial leader
  - Marty Feldman, English comedy writer, comedian and actor (d. 1982)
- July 9 – Michael Graves, American architect (d. 2015)
- July 10 – Jerry Nelson, American puppeteer (d. 2012)
- July 11
  - Giorgio Armani, Italian fashion designer (d. 2025)
  - Clark R. Rasmussen, American politician (d. 2024)
- July 12
  - Van Cliburn, American pianist (d. 2013)
  - Ulf Schmidt, Swedish tennis player
- July 13
  - Wole Soyinka, Nigerian writer and Nobel laureate
  - Aleksei Yeliseyev, Russian cosmonaut
- July 14 – Ángel del Pozo, Spanish actor (d. 2025)
- July 15 – Harrison Birtwistle, British composer (d. 2022)
- July 16 – George Hilton, Uruguayan-Italian actor (d. 2019)
- July 19 – Francisco de Sá Carneiro, Prime Minister of Portugal (d. 1980)
- July 22
  - Louise Fletcher, American actress (d. 2022)
  - Leon Rotman, Romanian sprint canoeist
  - Oluyemi Adeniji, Nigerian career diplomat, politician (d. 2017)
- July 24 – P. S. Soosaithasan, Sri Lankan Tamil politician (d. 2017)
- July 28 – Bud Luckey, American voice actor, Pixar animator (d. 2018)

=== August ===
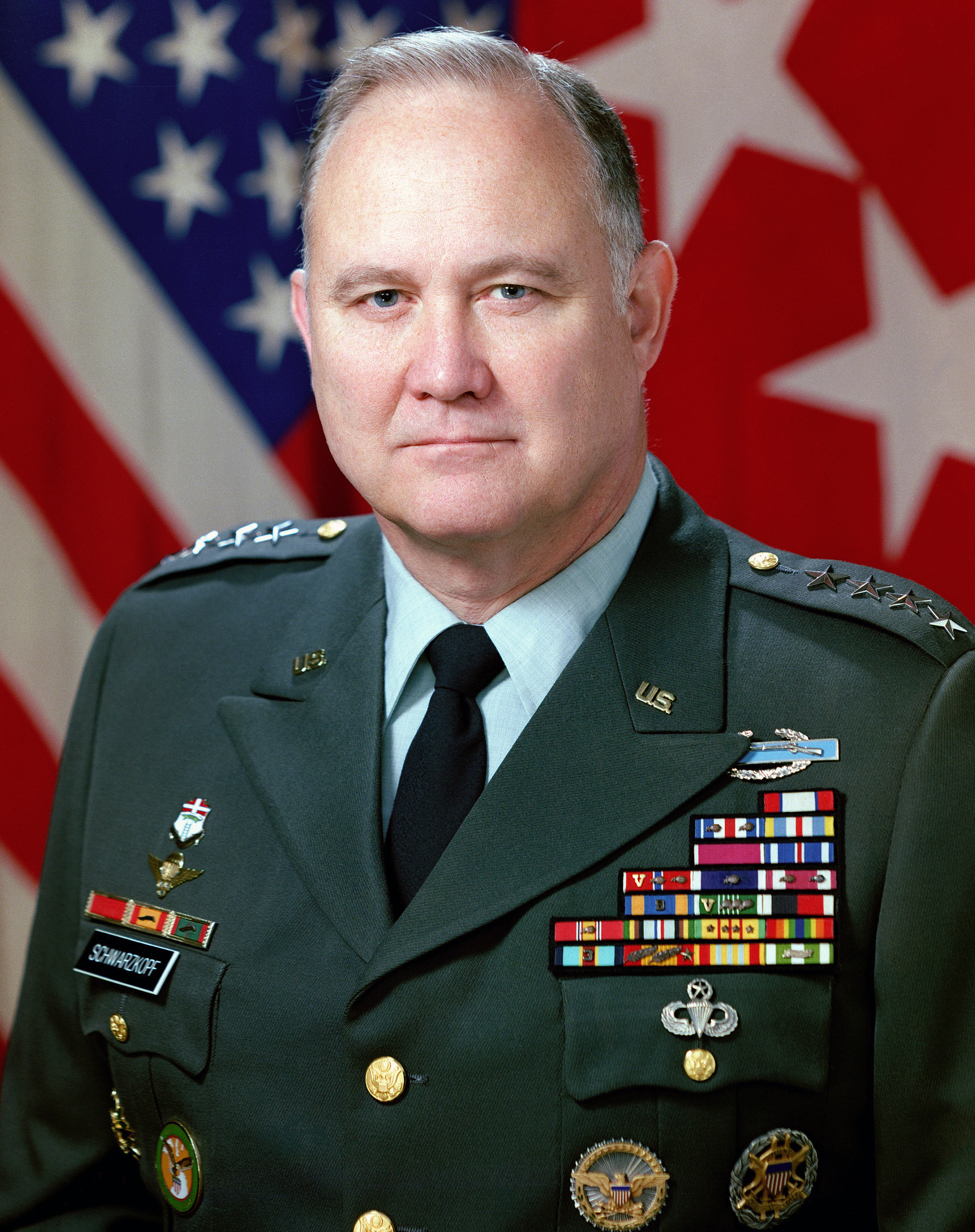
Norman Schwarzkopf

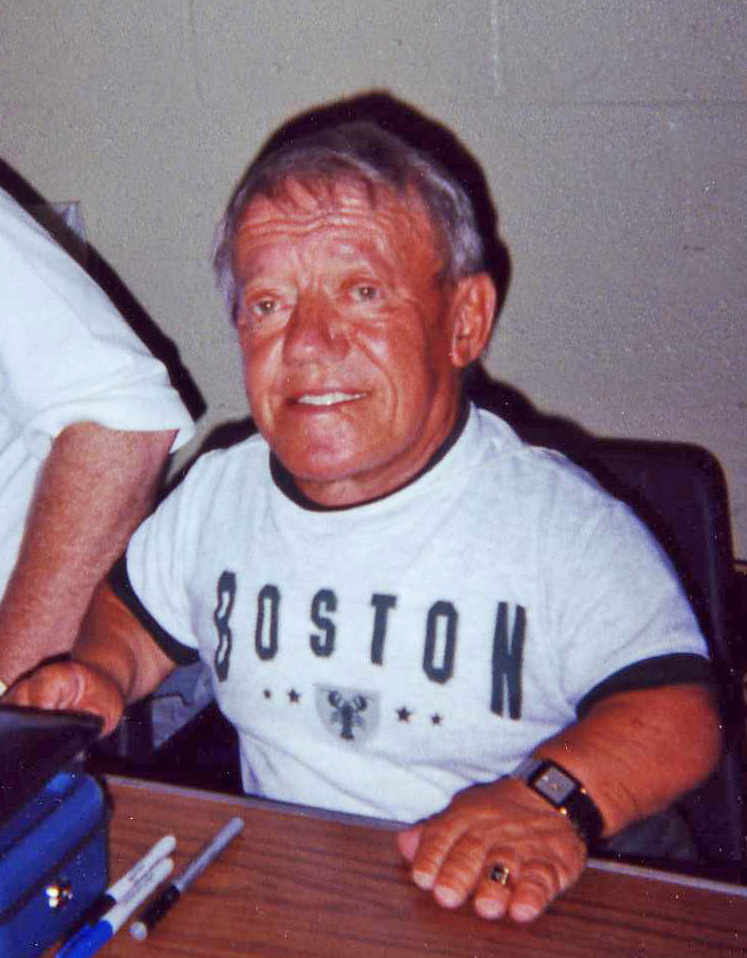
Kenny Baker

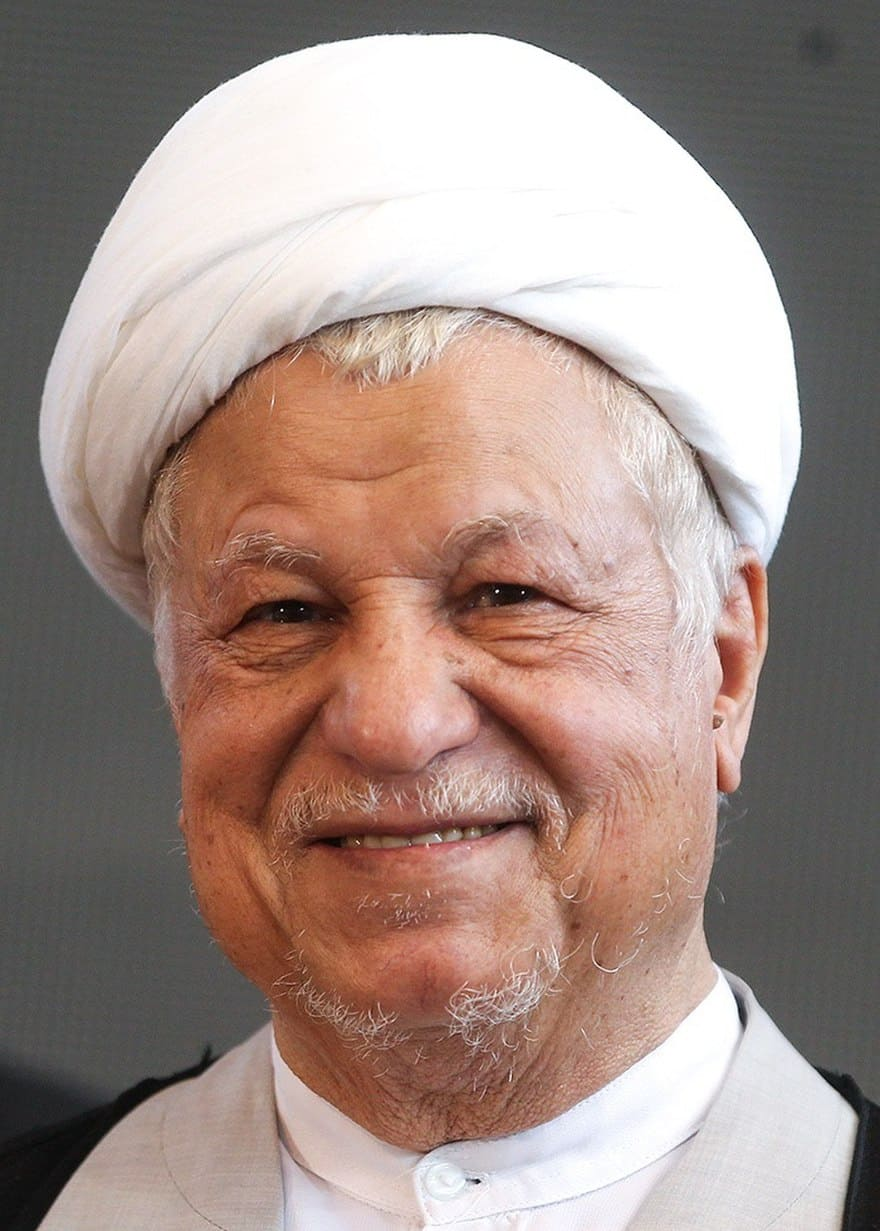
Akbar Hashemi Rafsanjani

- August 2 – Valery Bykovsky, Russian cosmonaut (d. 2019)
- August 3 – Jonas Savimbi, Angolan political and rebel leader (d. 2002)
- August 5 – Gay Byrne, Irish broadcaster (d. 2019)
- August 6 – Edmond Simeoni, Corsican politician and nationalist (d. 2018)
- August 11 – Viktor Tolmachev, Russian engineer (d. 2018)
- August 15
  - Nino Ferrer, French singer (d. 1998)
  - André Bo-Boliko Lokonga, Congolese politician (d. 2018)
- August 16 – Angela Buxton, British tennis player (d. 2020)
- August 18
  - Ronnie Carroll, Northern Irish singer (d. 2015)
  - Roberto Clemente, Puerto Rican Major League Baseball player (d. 1972)
  - Gulzar, Indian film director, lyricist and poet
- August 19 – Renée Richards, American ophthalmologist and tennis player
- August 20 – Armi Kuusela, Miss Universe 1952 from Finland
- August 22 – Norman Schwarzkopf, U.S. Army general (d. 2012)
- August 24 – Kenny Baker, English actor (d. 2016)
- August 25
  - Zilda Arns, Brazilian pediatrician, aid worker (d. 2010)
  - Hsiao Teng-tzang, Taiwanese politician (d. 2017)
  - Ayatollah Akbar Hashemi Rafsanjani, 4th President of Iran (d. 2017)
- August 28 – Zeng Shiqiang, Taiwanese sinologist, scholar, and writer (d. 2018)
- August 30
  - Anatoly Solonitsyn, Russian actor (d. 1982)
  - Tissa Vitharana, Sri Lankan politician, cabinet minister, governor, MP (2004–2015, 2020–2024) (d. 2026)

=== September ===
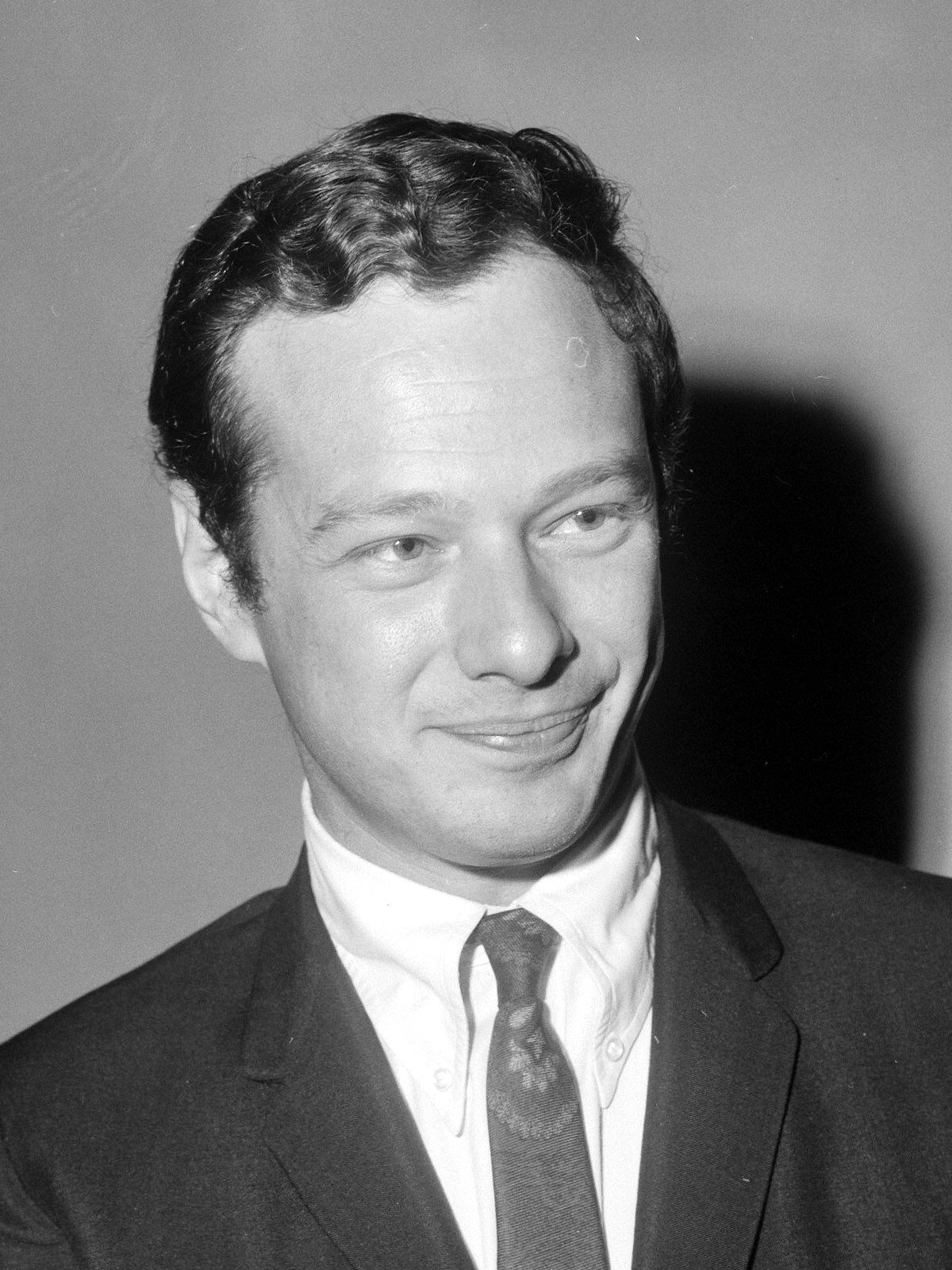
Brian Epstein

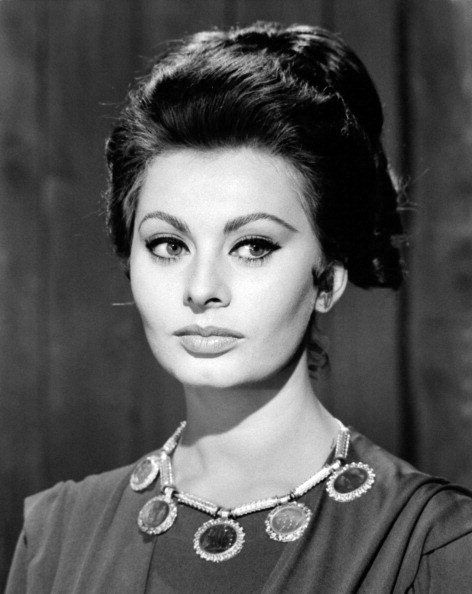
Sophia Loren

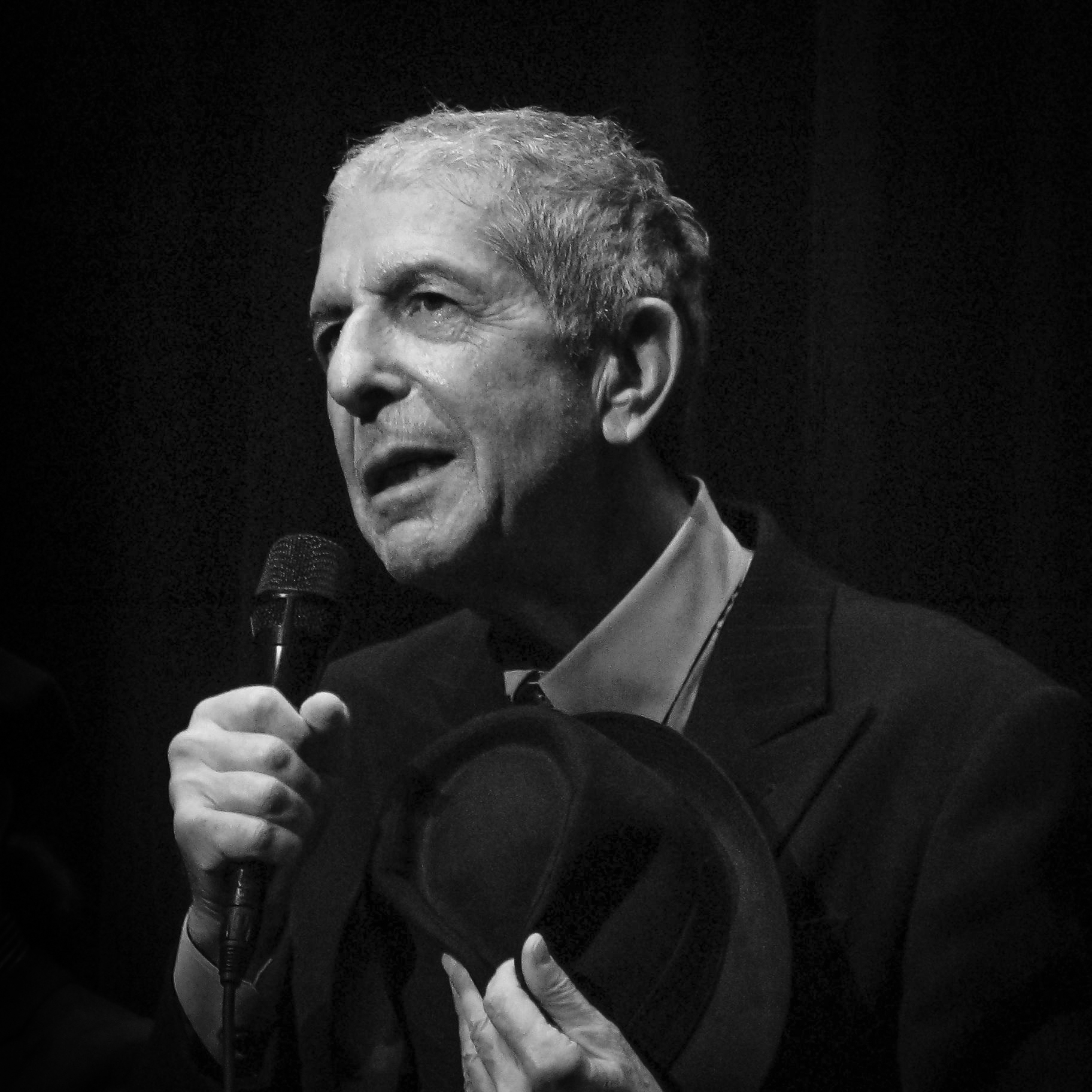
Leonard Cohen

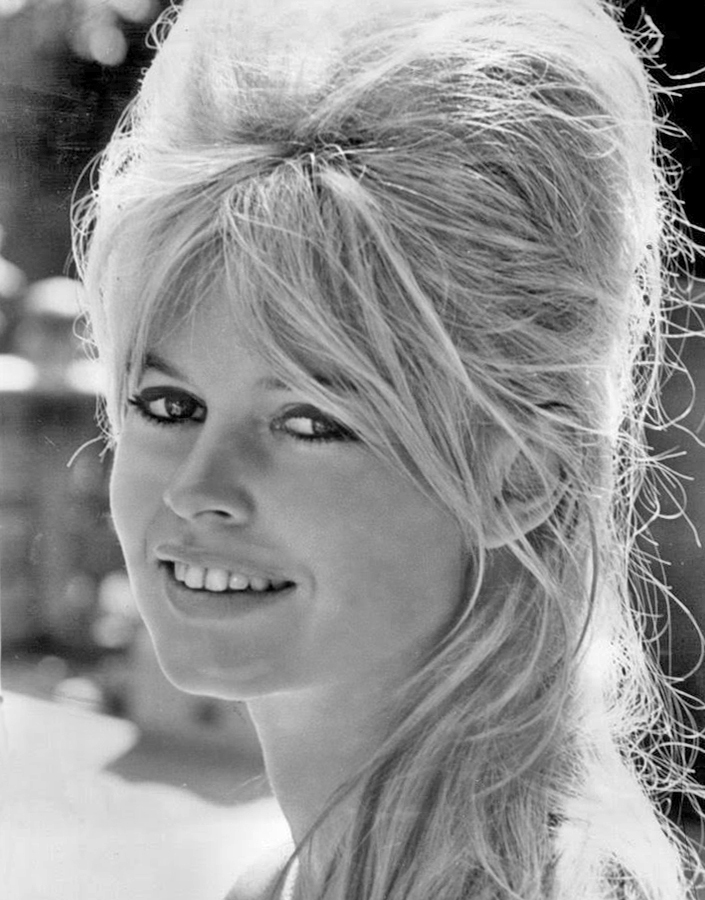
Brigitte Bardot

- September 1 – Léon Mébiame, Gabonese politician (d. 2015)
- September 4
  - Clive Granger, Welsh-born economist, Nobel Prize laureate (d. 2009)
  - Juraj Herz, Slovak film director, actor, and scenic designer (d. 2018)
  - Eduard Khil, Russian baritone singer ("Trololo") (d. 2012)
  - Zaid ibn Shaker, 3-time prime minister of Jordan (d. 2002)
  - Jan Švankmajer, Czech filmmaker, artist
- September 6 – Marshall Rosenberg, American psychologist and writer (d. 2015)
- September 7 – Omar Karami, 29th Prime Minister of Lebanon (d. 2015)
- September 8 – Peter Maxwell Davies, English composer (d. 2016)
- September 9 – Nicholas Liverpool, Dominican lawyer, politician, and 6th President of Dominica (d. 2015)
- September 11 – Ian Abercrombie, English actor (d. 2012)
- September 13 – Zbigniew Zapasiewicz, Polish actor (d. 2009)
- September 15 – Fob James, American politician and Governor of Alabama from 1979 to 1983, and from 1995 to 1999
- September 16
  - Elgin Baylor, American basketball player and executive (d. 2021)
  - Ronnie Drew, Irish singer with The Dubliners band (d. 2008)
- September 17 – Maureen Connolly, American tennis player (d. 1969)
- September 19 – Brian Epstein, British manager of the Beatles, co-founder of Northern Songs (d. 1967)
- September 20
  - Rajinder Puri, Indian cartoonist, veteran columnist and political activist (d. 2015)
  - Sophia Loren, Italian actress
  - Takayuki Kubota, Japanese martial artist, founder of the Gosoku-ryu style of karate (d. 2024)
- September 21
  - Leonard Cohen, Canadian poet, novelist, singer and songwriter (d. 2016)
  - David J. Thouless, Scottish-born condensed-matter physicist, recipient of the Nobel Prize in Physics (d. 2019)
  - María Rubio, Mexican actress (d. 2018)
- September 23 – Ahmad Shah Khan, Crown Prince of Afghanistan (d. 2024)
- September 27 – Wilford Brimley, American actor and singer (d. 2020)
- September 28 – Brigitte Bardot, French actress, animal rights activist (d. 2025)
- September 29 – Idowu Sofola, Nigerian jurist (d. 2018)
- September 30 – Udo Jürgens, Austrian-Swiss composer, popular music singer (d. 2014)

=== October ===
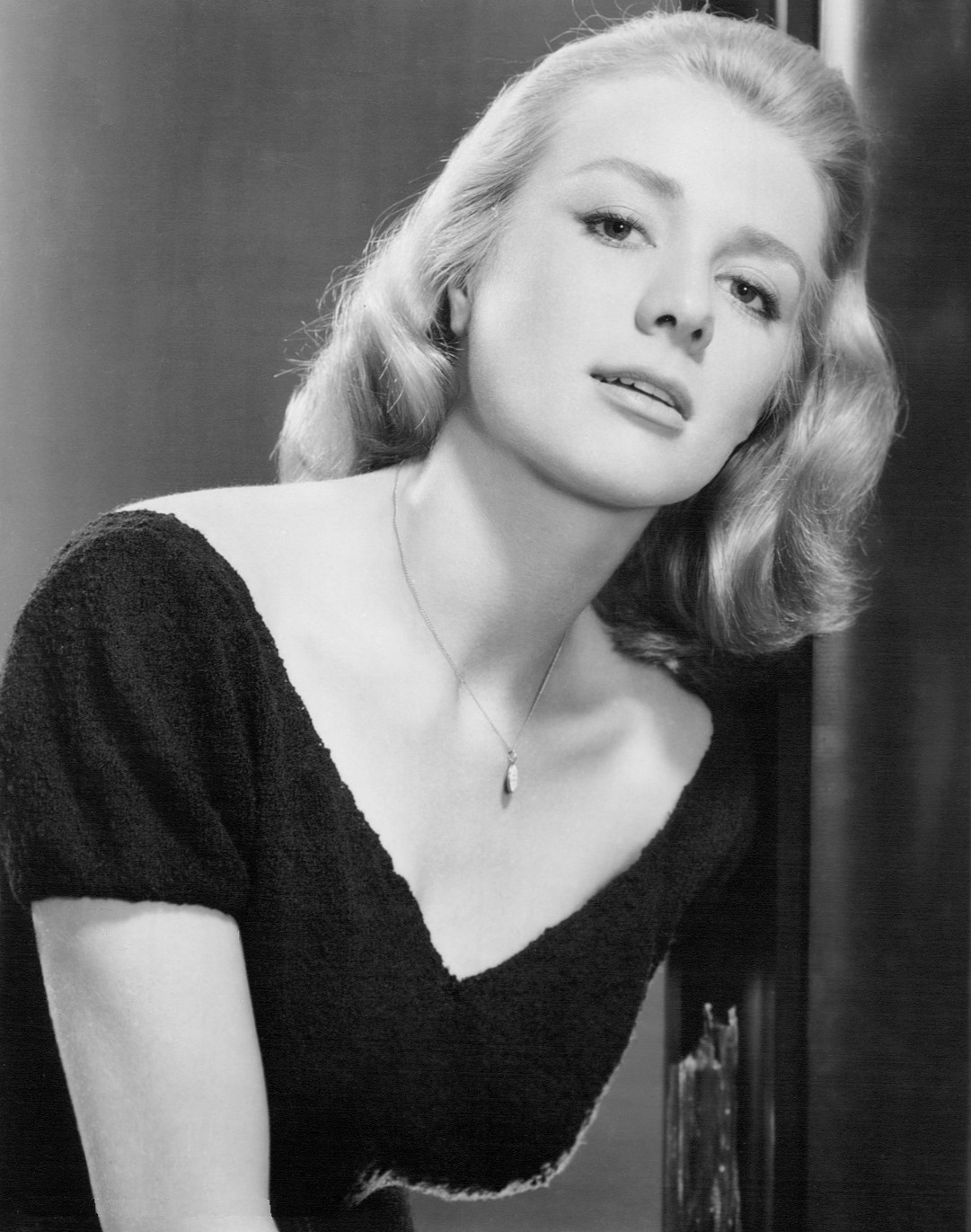
Inger Stevens

- October 5 – Angelo Buono, American serial killer (d. 2002)
- October 7 – Amiri Baraka, African-American poet, playwright and activist (d. 2014)
- October 9
  - Jacobo Majluta Azar, 47th President of the Dominican Republic (d. 1996)
  - Abdullah Ibrahim, South African pianist and composer (d. 2026)
- October 12 – Abd Al-Karim Al-Iryani, Prime Minister of Yemen (d. 2015)
- October 13 – Nana Mouskouri, Greek popular singer
- October 18 – Inger Stevens, Swedish-born American actress (d. 1970)
- October 19 – Yakubu Gowon, Nigerian politician
- October 20
  - Empress Michiko, Empress of Japan
  - Mary Peach, British actress (d. 2025)
- October 23 – Herb Simon, American businessman
- October 30 – Frans Brüggen, Dutch baroque conductor and woodwind player (d. 2014)
- October 31 – Princess Margaretha, Mrs. Ambler, Princess of Sweden

=== November ===
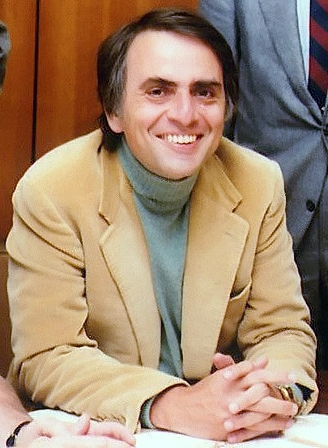
Carl Sagan

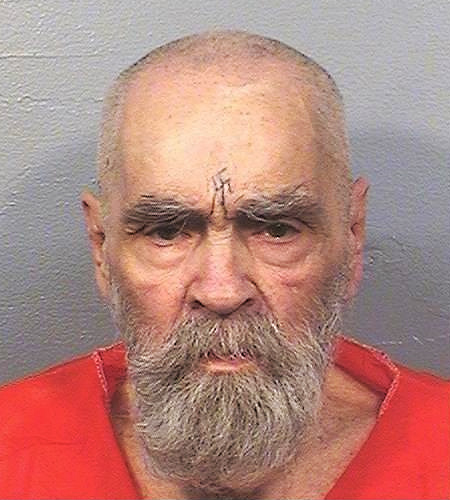
Charles Manson

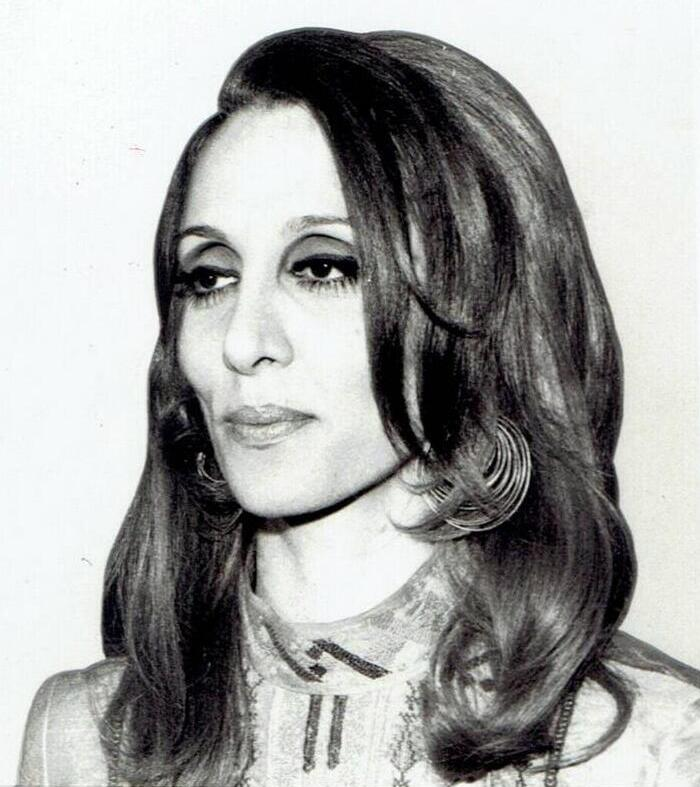
Fairuz

- November 1 – Umberto Agnelli, Swiss-born automobile executive (d. 2004)
- November 2 – Ken Rosewall, Australian tennis champion
- November 5 – Kira Muratova, Ukrainian film director, screenwriter and actress (d. 2018)
- November 9
  - Ingvar Carlsson, twice prime minister of Sweden
  - Hamilton Green, 4th prime minister of Guyana
  - Carl Sagan, American astronomer, writer, and TV presenter (d. 1996)
  - Tengiz Sigua, 2nd Prime Minister of Georgia (d. 2020)
- November 11
  - Elżbieta Krzesińska, Polish athlete (d. 2015)
  - Latha Walpola, Sri Lankan singer (d. 2025)
- November 12 – Charles Manson, American cult leader and convicted murderer (d. 2017)
- November 13 – Garry Marshall, American film producer, director and actor (d. 2016)
- November 20 – Fairuz, Lebanese singer
- November 23 – Lew Hoad, Australian tennis champion (d. 1994)
- November 26 – Denise Barthomeuf, French chemist (d. 2004)
- November 30 – Lansana Conté, President of Guinea (d. 2008)

=== December ===
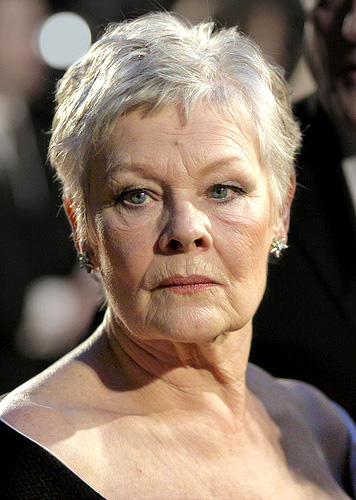
Judi Dench

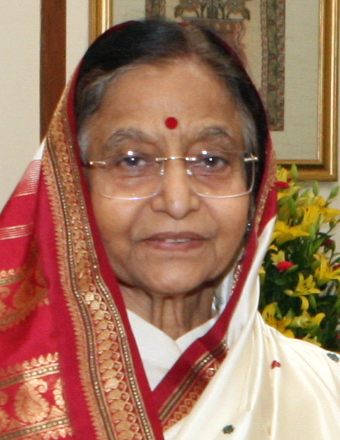
Pratibha Patil

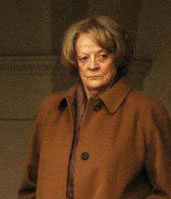
Maggie Smith

- December 1 – Billy Paul, African-American singer (d. 2016)
- December 3 – Viktor Gorbatko, Russian cosmonaut (d. 2017)
- December 5 – Joan Didion, American novelist (d. 2021)
- December 8 – Alisa Freindlich, Soviet and Russian actress
- December 9
  - Judi Dench, English actress
  - Junior Wells, American harmonica player (d. 1998)
- December 10 – Howard Martin Temin, American geneticist, recipient of the Nobel Prize in Physiology or Medicine (d. 1994)
- December 11 – Radha Viswanathan, Indian vocalist, classical dancer (d. 2018)
- December 12 – Miguel de la Madrid, 52nd president of Mexico (d. 2012)
- December 13 – Richard D. Zanuck, American producer (d. 2012)
- December 14 – Shyam Benegal, Indian film director and screenwriter (d. 2024)
- December 15 – Abdullahi Yusuf Ahmed, 6th president of Somalia (d. 2012)
- December 17 – Shan Tianfang, Chinese pingshu performer (d. 2018)
- December 18 – Boris Volynov, Russian cosmonaut
- December 19
  - Aki Aleong, Trinidad and Tobago-born American actor (d. 2025)
  - Pratibha Patil, President of India
- December 24 – Stjepan Mesić, 2nd President of Croatia
- December 28
  - Forough Farrokhzad, Iranian poet, writer and filmmaker (d. 1967)
  - Maggie Smith, English actress (d. 2024)
  - Yujiro Ishihara, Japanese actor (d. 1987)
- December 30
  - John N. Bahcall, American astrophysicist and astronomer, co-developed the Hubble Space Telescope (d. 2005)
  - Joseph Bologna, American actor, director, playwright and screenwriter (d. 2017)
  - Barry Briggs, New Zealand motorcycle racer and sportscaster
  - Joseph P. Hoar, American general (d. 2022)
  - Tony Serra, American criminal defense and civil rights attorney, political activist and tax resister
  - Del Shannon, American singer (Runaway) (d. 1990)
  - Russ Tamblyn, American film and television actor

== Deaths ==
=== January ===
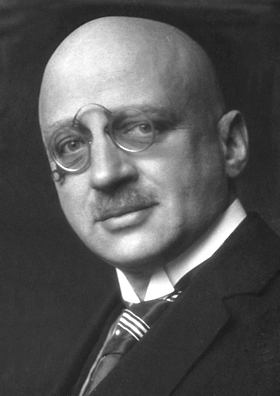
Fritz Haber

- January 1 – Jakob Wassermann, German writer (b. 1873)
- January 6 – Herbert Chapman, English football manager (b. 1878)
- January 7 – Augustin Dubail, French general (b. 1851)
- January 8 – Andrei Bely, Russian writer (b. 1880)
- January 10 – Marinus van der Lubbe, Dutch communist accused of setting fire to the Reichstag (executed) (b. 1909)
- January 11 – Helen Zimmern, German-born British writer and translator (b. 1846)
- January 15 – Hermann Bahr, Austrian writer and playwright (b. 1863)
- January 16 – Henry Walter Barnett, Australian photographer and filmmaker (b. 1862)
- January 21 – Aref Qazvini, Iranian poet, lyricist and musician (b. 1882)
- January 22 – Robert Brady, American criminal (b. 1904)
- January 29 – Fritz Haber, German chemist, Nobel Prize laureate (b. 1868)

=== February ===
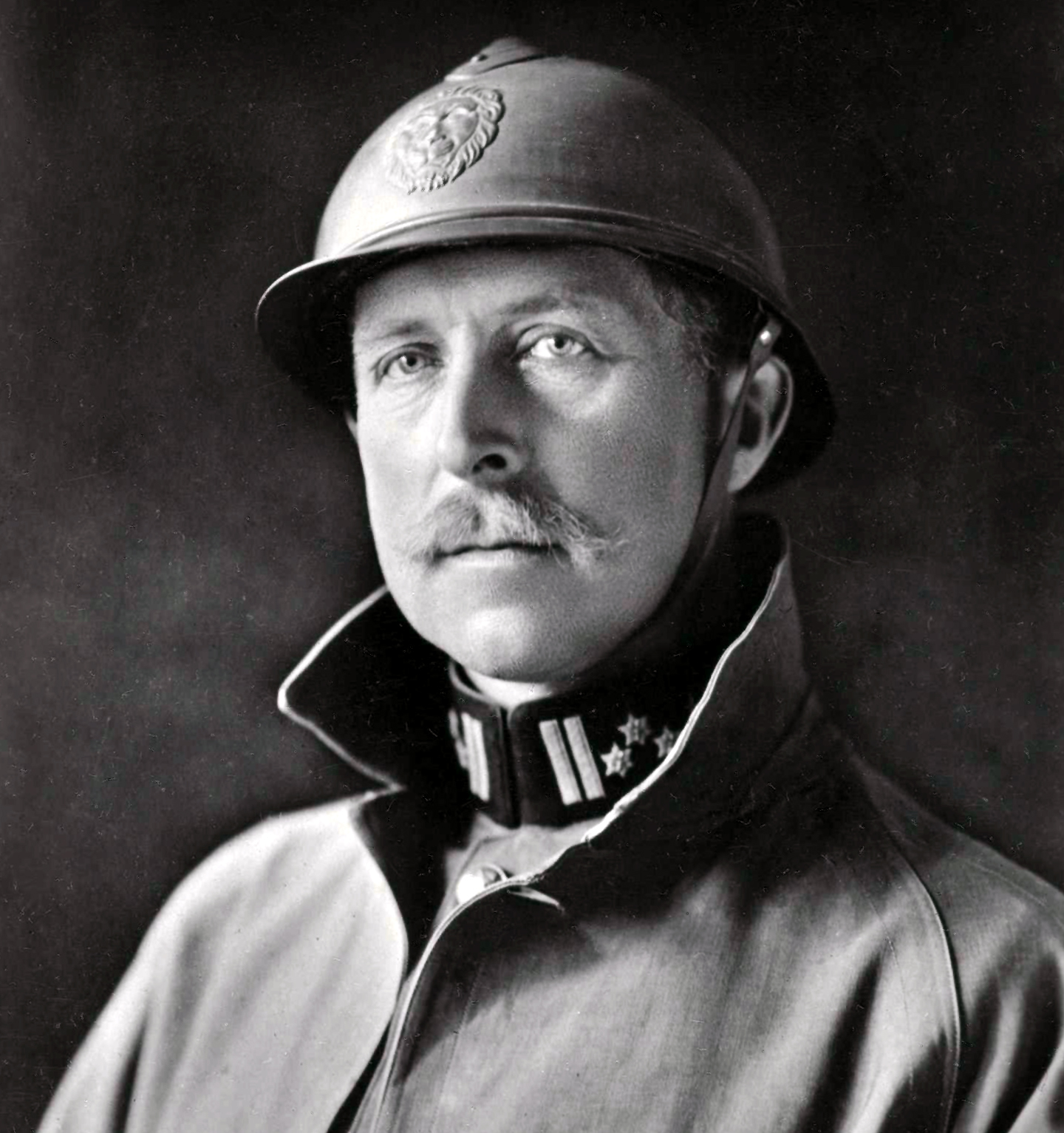
King Albert I of Belgium

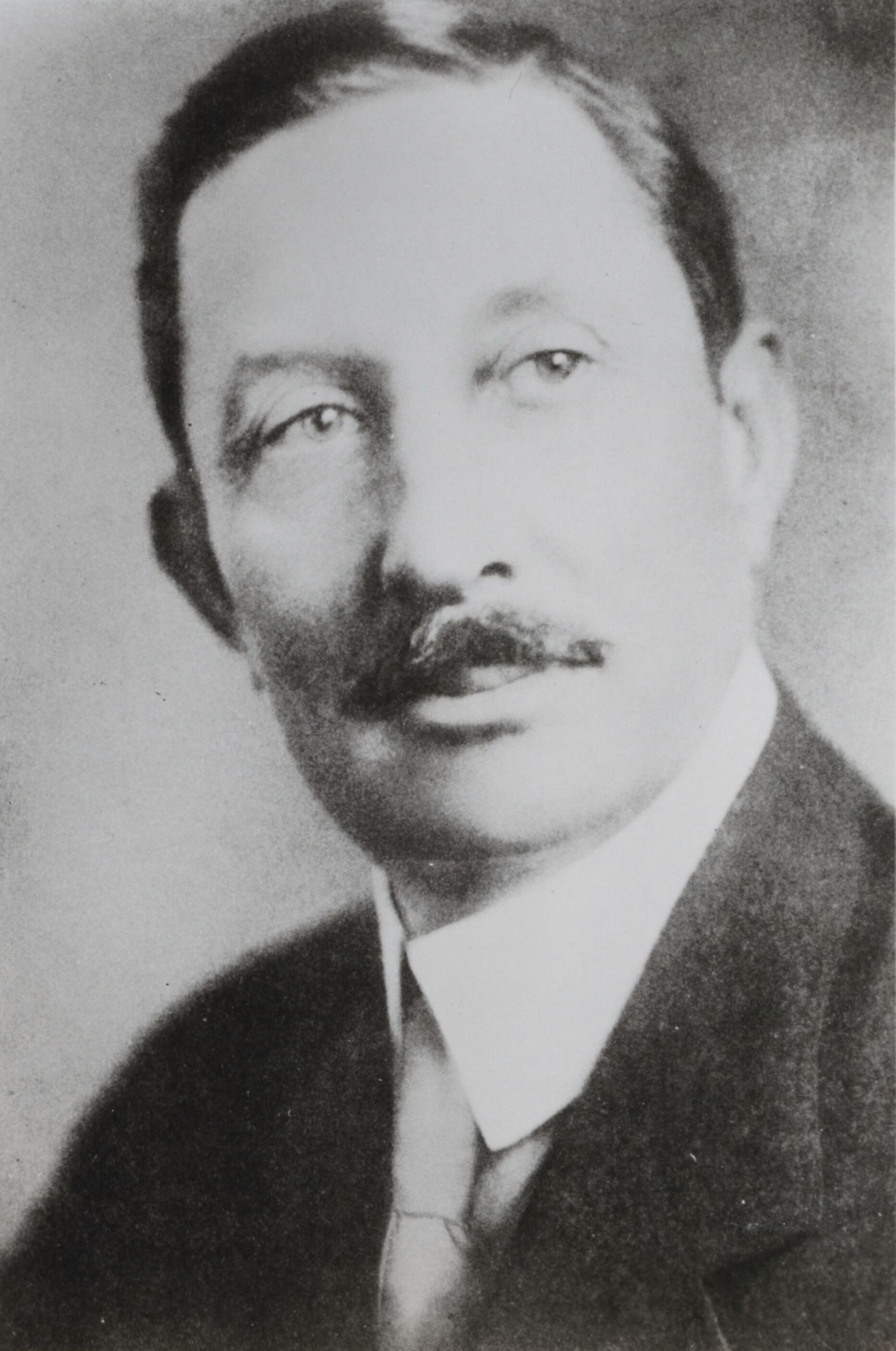
Caleb Bradham

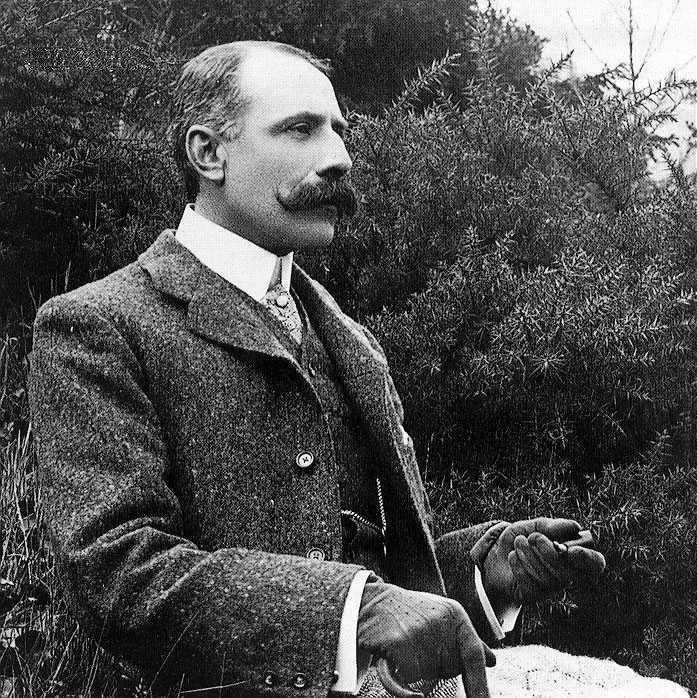
Edward Elgar

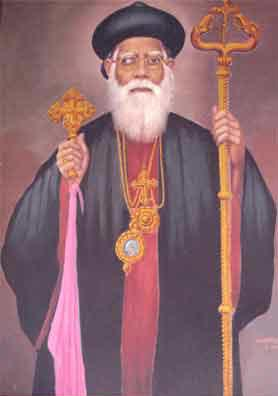
Saint Geevarghese Dionysius of Vattasseril

- February 2 – Maria Domenica Mantovani, Italian Roman Catholic religious professed and blessed (b. 1862)
- February 3 – Eleonora de Cisneros, American opera singer (b. 1878)
- February 17 – King Albert I of Belgium (b. 1875)
- February 19 – Caleb Bradham, American pharmacist, inventor of Pepsi (b. 1867)
- February 21 – Augusto César Sandino, Nicaraguan revolutionary and rebel (murdered) (b. 1895)
- February 23
  - Sir Edward Elgar, British composer (b. 1857)
  - Geevarghese Dionysius of Vattasseril, Indian Orthodox priest and saint (b. 1858)
- February 25 – Elizabeth Gertrude Britton, American botanist, bryologist, and educator (b. 1858)

=== March ===
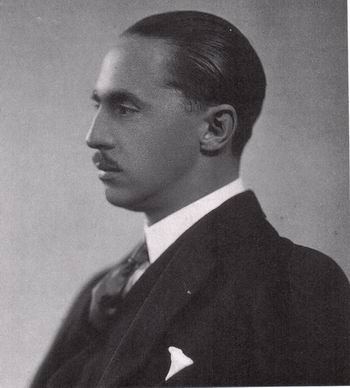
Prince Sixtus of Bourbon-Parma

- March 1
  - Wilhelm Diegelmann, German actor (b. 1861)
  - Charles Webster Leadbeater, British author and Theosophist (b. 1854)
- March 14
  - João do Canto e Castro, Portuguese army officer, 67th Prime Minister of Portugal and 5th President of Portugal (b. 1862)
  - Prince Sixtus of Bourbon-Parma (b. 1886)
- March 15 – Davidson Black, Canadian-born paleoanthropologist (b. 1884)
- March 19 – Edward Montagu-Stuart-Wortley, British army general (b. 1857)
- March 20
  - Emma of Waldeck and Pyrmont, Dutch Queen and regent (b.1858)
  - Sydney Deane, Australian cricketer and actor (b. 1863)
- March 21
  - Nicanor Abelardo, Filipino composer (b. 1873)
  - Lilyan Tashman, American actress (b. 1896)
- March 26 – Alfredo Acton, Italian admiral and politician (b. 1867)
- March 27 – Francis William Reitz, 5th president of the Orange Free State (b. 1844)
- March 28 – Mahmoud Mokhtar, Egyptian sculptor (b. 1891)
- March 29 – Otto Hermann Kahn, German-born philanthropist (b. 1867)
- March 30
  - Paul Cazeneuve, French politician (b. 1852)
  - Ronald Munro Ferguson, 1st Viscount Novar, Scottish politician, 8th Governor-General of Australia (b. 1860)
- March 31 – Colette Kreder, French engineer, entrepreneur and feminist. (d. 2022)

=== April ===
- April 7
  - Béatrice Ephrussi de Rothschild, French socialite (b. 1864)
  - Karl von Einem, German general (b. 1853)
- April 9 – Safvet-beg Basagic, Yugoslav writer (b. 1870)
- April 11
  - Gerald du Maurier, British actor (b. 1873)
  - John Collier, British painter (b. 1850)
- April 15 – Karl Dane, Danish actor (b. 1886)
- April 18 – Raffaele Garofalo, Italian criminologist and jurist (b. 1851)
- April 26
  - Arturs Alberings, 6th Prime Minister of Latvia (b. 1876)
  - John Hamilton, Canadian gangster (b. 1899)
- April 27 – Joe Vila, American sportswriter (b. 1866)
- April 28 – Charley Patton, American Delta blues musician
- April 30 – Hugh L. Scott, United States Army general (b. 1853)

=== May ===
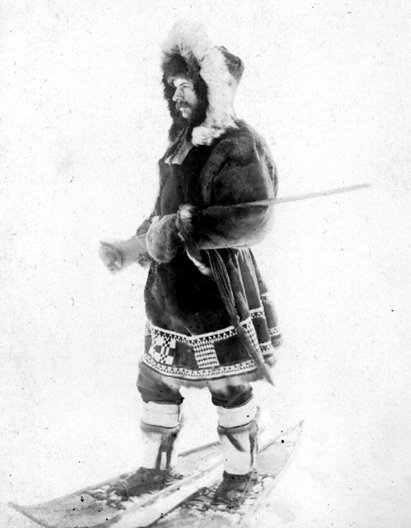
Edward William Nelson

- May 17 – Cass Gilbert, American architect (b. 1859)
- May 19 – Edward William Nelson, American naturalist (b. 1855)
- May 21 – James Durkin, Canadian-born American actor (b. 1879)
- May 23
  - Clyde Barrow, American outlaw, member of Barrow Gang (b. 1909)
  - Bonnie Parker, American outlaw, member of Barrow Gang (b. 1910)
- May 24 – Brand Whitlock, American journalist and politician (b. 1869)
- May 25 – Gustav Holst, British composer (b. 1874)
- May 26 – Prince Alfonso, Count of Caserta (b. 1841)
- May 29 – Eugenie Besserer, American silent film actress (b. 1868)
- May 30
  - Tōgō Heihachirō, Japanese admiral (b. 1848)
  - Julia Lopes de Almeida, Brazilian advocate and writer (b. 1862)
- May 31 – Lew Cody, American actor (b. 1884)

=== June ===
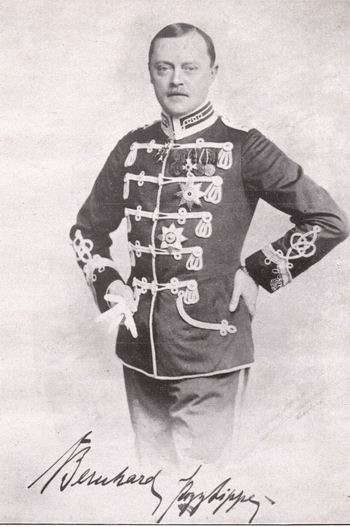
Prince Bernhard of Lippe

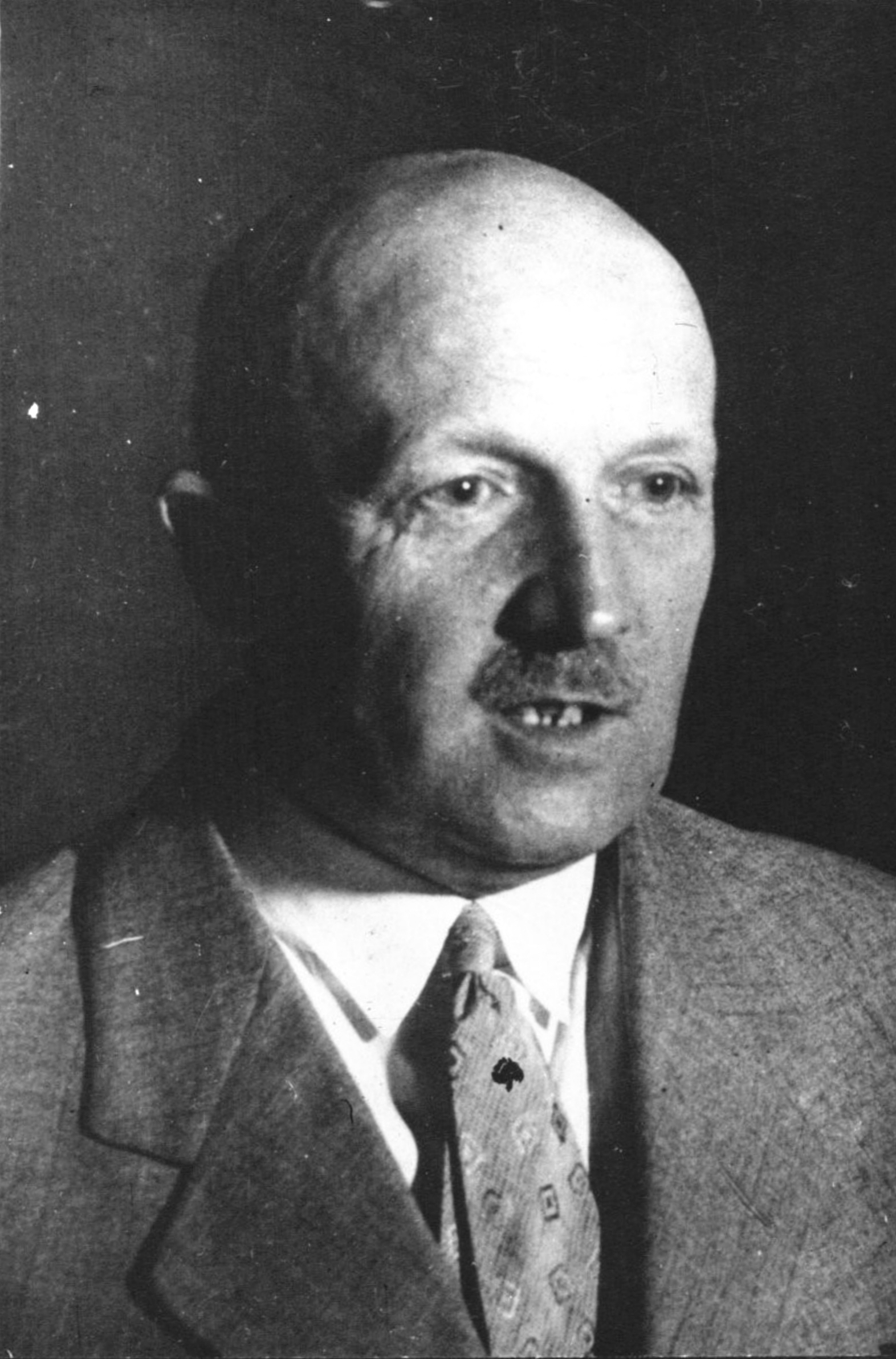
Kurt von Schleicher

- June 8
  - Dorothy Dell, American actress (b. 1915)
- June 9
  - Medeiros e Albuquerque, Brazilian poet and politician (b. 1867)
  - Richard Thornton Fisher, American forester and educator
- June 10 – Frederick Delius, British composer (b. 1862)
- June 11 – Lev Vygotsky, Russian developmental psychologist (b. 1896)
- June 19 – Prince Bernhard of Lippe (b. 1872)
- June 27 – Francesco Buhagiar, 2nd Prime Minister of Malta (b. 1876)
- June 30 – Murdered during the Night of the Long Knives:
  - Karl Ernst, Nazi SA leader in Berlin (b. 1904)
  - Fritz Gerlich, German journalist (b. 1883)
  - Edmund Heines, Deputy SA leader (b. 1897)
  - Gustav von Kahr, German politician (b. 1862)
  - Kurt von Schleicher, 23rd Chancellor of Germany (b. 1882)
  - Gregor Strasser, German Nazi politician (b. 1892)

=== July ===
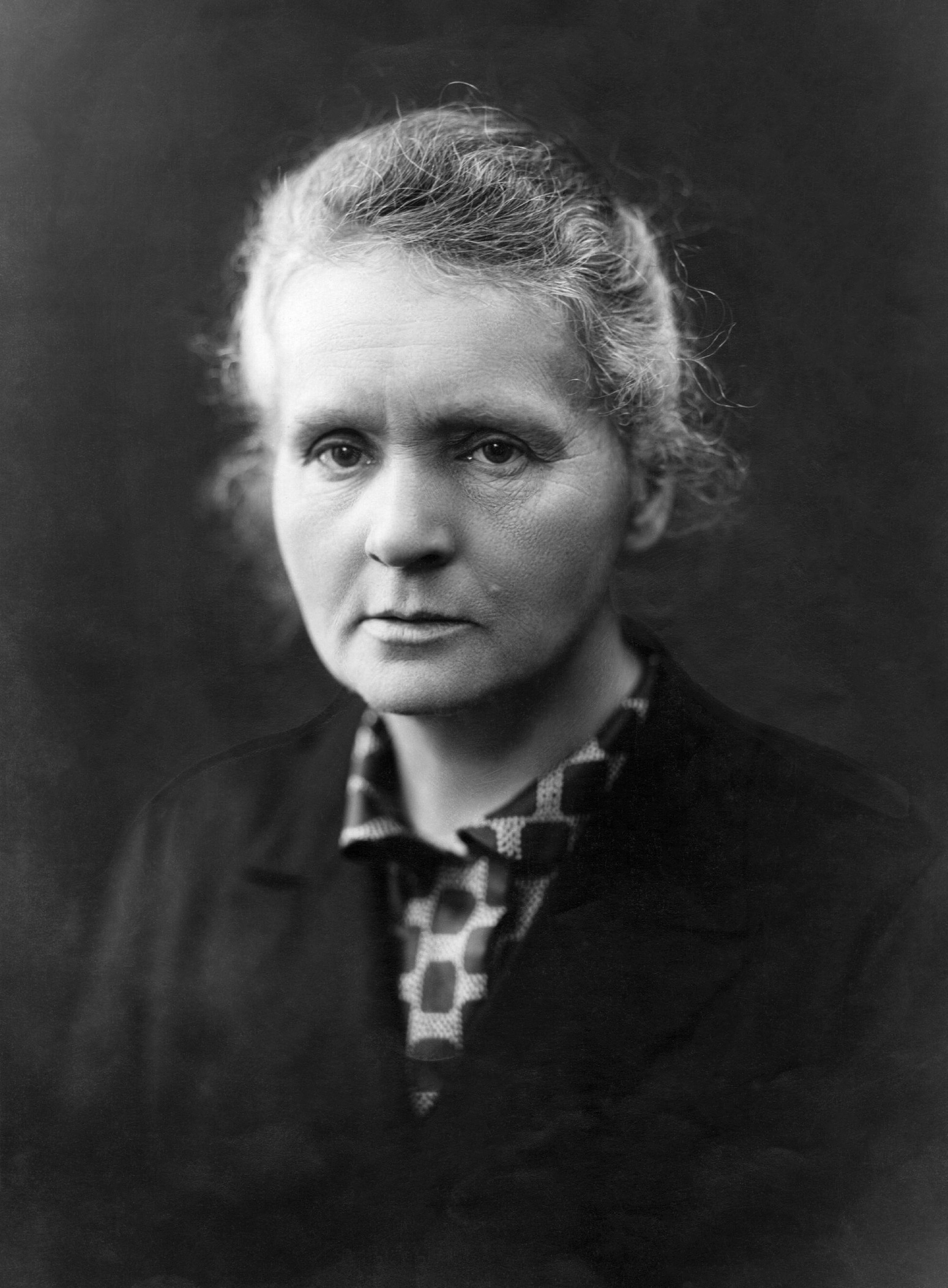
Marie Curie

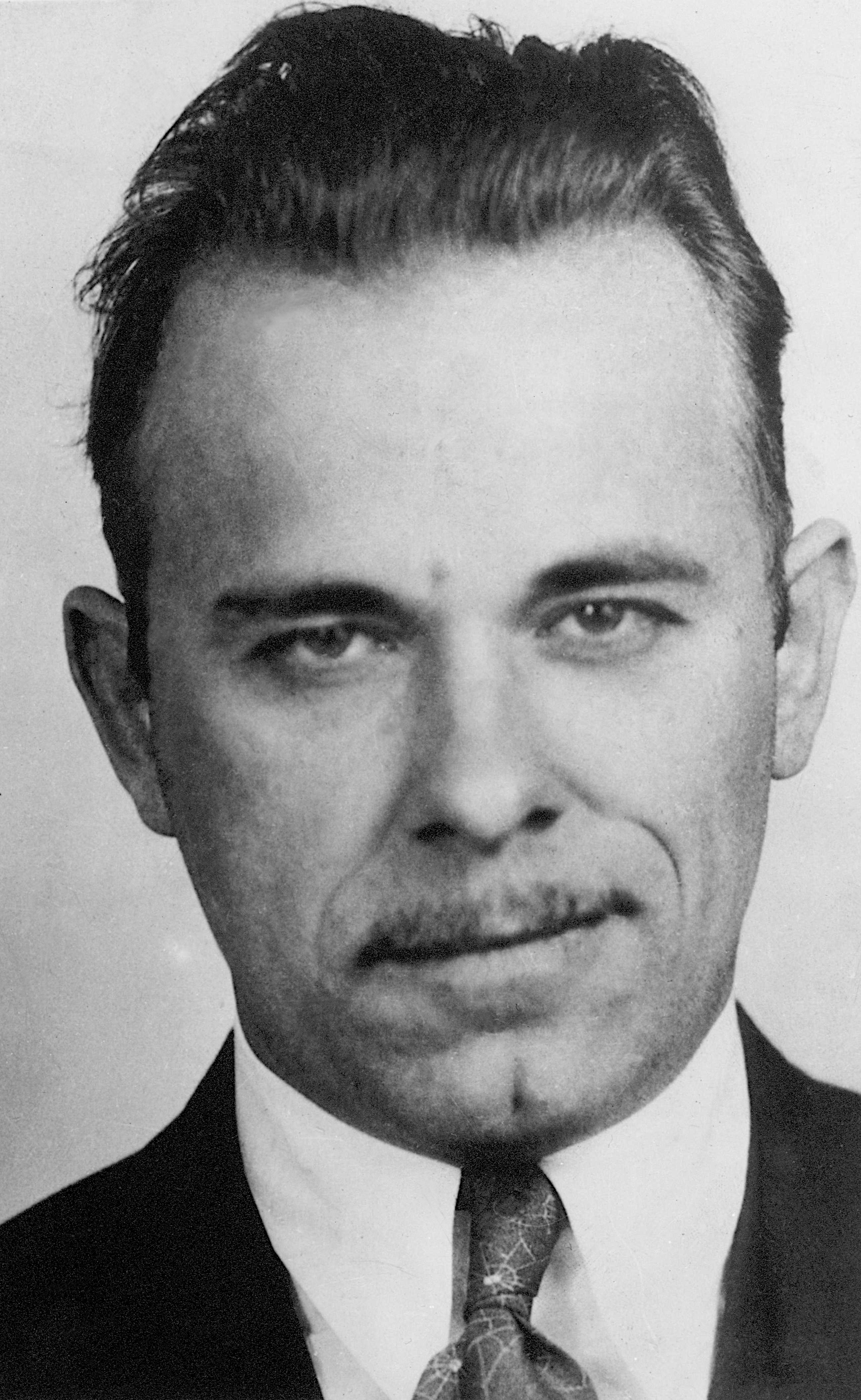
John Dillinger

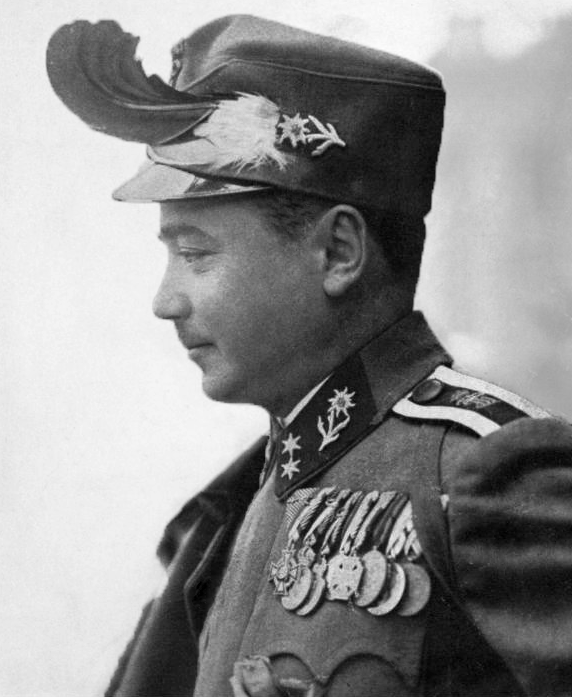
Engelbert Dollfuss

- July 1
  - Ernst Röhm, German politician, Nazi SA Leader (assassinated) (b. 1887)
  - Edgar Jung, German lawyer and political activist (assassinated) (b. 1894)
- July 3 – Duke Henry of Mecklenburg-Schwerin, Dutch prince consort (b. 1876)
- July 4
  - Marie Curie, Polish-born scientist, recipient of the Nobel Prize in Chemistry and physics (b. 1867)
  - Hayim Nahman Bialik, Russian-born Jewish poet, considered Israel's national poet (b. 1873)
- July 5 – Ahmad Zaki Pasha, Egyptian philologist (b. 1867)
- July 6 – Prince Pedro Augusto of Saxe-Coburg and Gotha (b. 1866)
- July 8 – Benjamin Baillaud, French astronomer (b. 1848)
- July 10 – Erich Mühsam, German author (b. 1878)
- July 13
  - Kate Sheppard, New Zealand women's suffragist (b. 1848)
  - Ignacio Sánchez Mejías, Spanish bullfighter (b. 1891)
- July 15
  - Louis F. Gottschalk, American composer (b. 1864)
  - Jules Renkin, Belgian politician and 28th Prime Minister of Belgium (b. 1862)
- July 16 – Carlo Bergamini, Italian sculptor (b. 1868)
- July 20 – Padre Cicero, Brazilian Roman Catholic priest and reverend (b. 1844)
- July 21 – Hubert Lyautey, Marshal of France (b. 1854)
- July 22 – John Dillinger, American gangster (b. 1903)
- July 23 – María Pilar López de Maturana Ortiz de Zárate, Spanish Roman Catholic religious blessed and blessed (b. 1884)
- July 24 – Hans Hahn, Austrian mathematician (b. 1879)
- July 25
  - François Coty, French perfume manufacturer (b. 1874)
  - Engelbert Dollfuss, Austrian statesman and 10th Chancellor of Austria (assassinated) (b. 1892)
- July 26 – Winsor McCay, American comic creator and animator (b. 1869)
- July 28
  - Marie Dressler, Canadian actress (b. 1868)
  - Louis Tancred, South African cricketer (b. 1876)
  - Edith Yorke, British actress (b. 1867)
- July 30 – Sir Henry Norris, British politician and businessman (b. 1865)

=== August ===
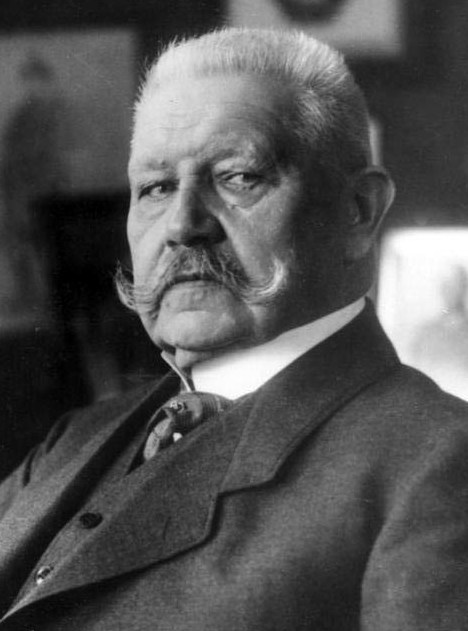
Paul von Hindenburg

- August 2 – Paul von Hindenburg, German general and politician, 2nd President of Germany (b. 1847)
- August 8 – Wilbert Robinson, American baseball manager and MLB Hall of Famer (b. 1863)
- August 9 – Alfred Steux, Belgian road racing cyclist (b. 1892)
- August 10 – George Hill, American director (b. 1895)
- August 13 – Mary Hunter Austin, American writer of fiction and non-fiction (b. 1868)
- August 14 – Raymond Hood, American architect (b. 1881)
- August 23 – Homer Van Meter, American criminal and bank robber (b. 1905)
- August 27 – Linda Agostini, British-born Australian homicide victim (b. 1905)
- August 28 – Sir Edgeworth David, British-born Australian geologist and explorer (b. 1858)

=== September ===
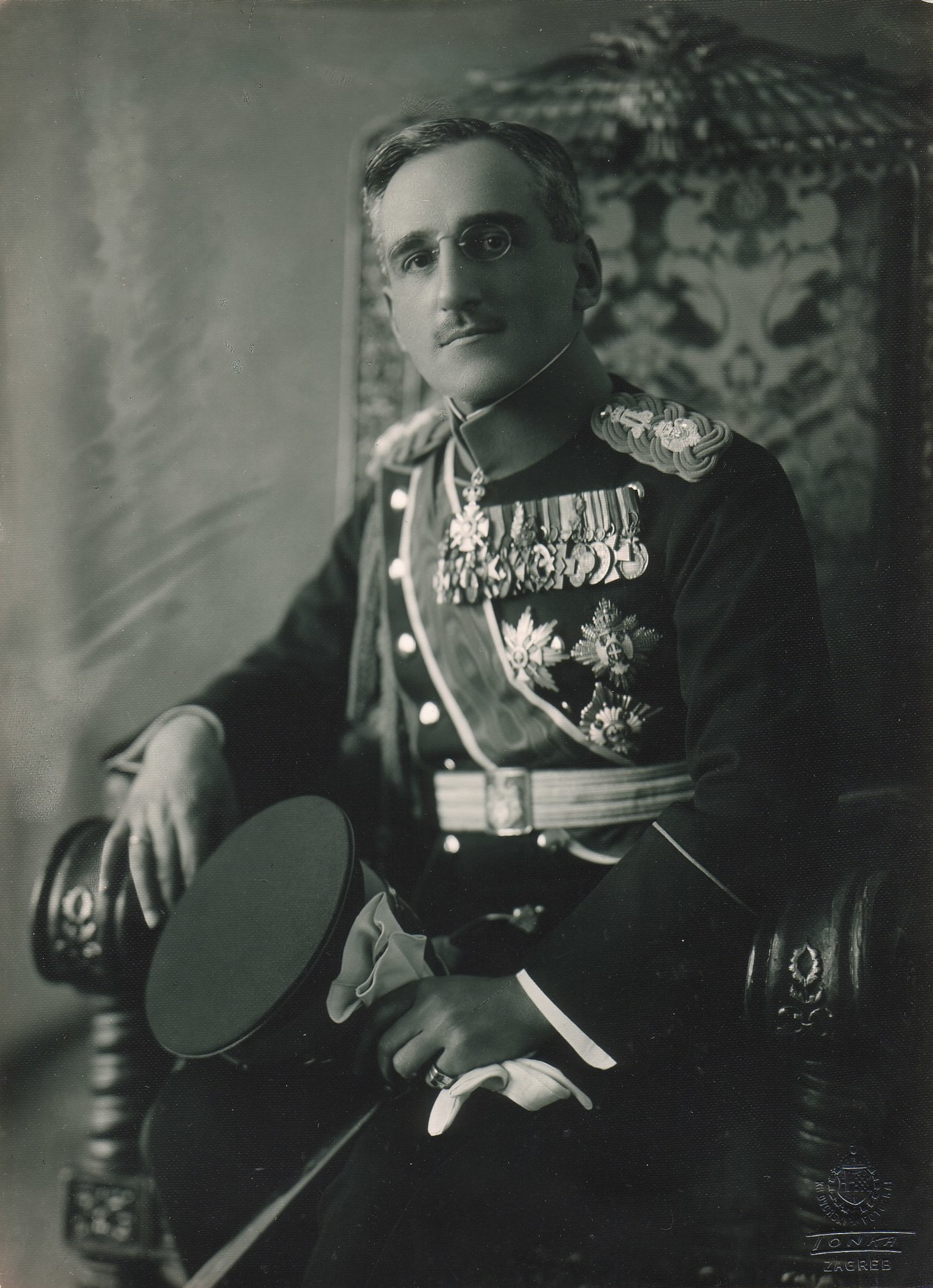
King Alexander I of Yugoslavia

- September 2 – Russ Columbo, American singer and actor (b. 1908)
- September 9 – Roger Fry, British artist (b. 1866)
- September 10 – Sir George Henschel, English musician (b. 1850)
- September 13 – Serafina Astafieva, Russian ballet dancer (b. 1876)
- September 22 – Charles Makley, American criminal (b. 1889)

=== October ===
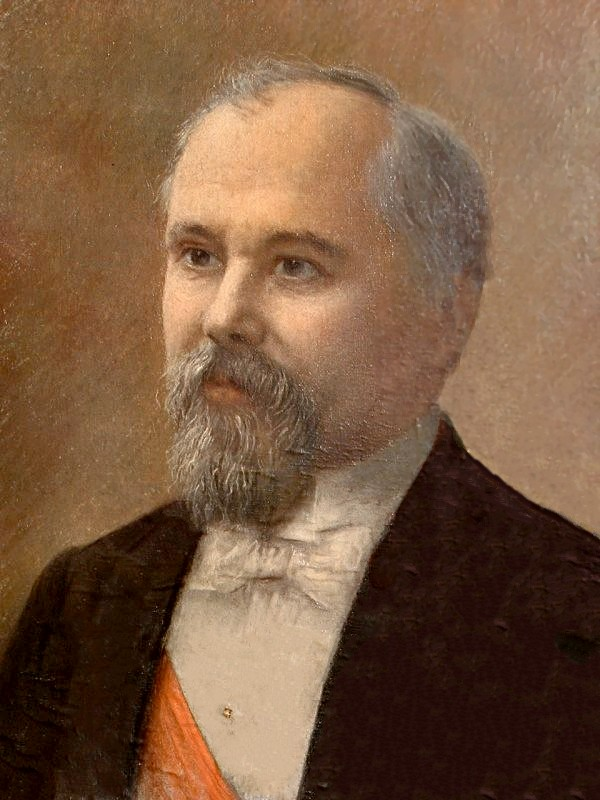
Raymond Poincaré

- October 5 – Jean Vigo, French film director (b. 1905)
- October 9
  - King Alexander I of Yugoslavia (b. 1888) (assassinated)
  - Vlado Chernozemski, Bulgarian revolutionary leader (b. 1897)
  - Saint Innocencio of Mary Immaculate, Spanish Roman Catholic priest and saint (b. 1887)
- October 12 – Willy Clarkson, British costume designer and wigmaker (b. 1861)
- October 14 – Mikhail Matyushin, Russian painter and composer (b. 1861)
- October 15 – Raymond Poincaré, 58th Prime Minister of France and 10th President of France during World War I (b. 1860)
- October 17 – Santiago Ramón y Cajal, Spanish histologist and neuroscientist, recipient of the Nobel Prize in Physiology or Medicine (b. 1852)
- October 19 – Alexander von Kluck, German general (b. 1846)
- October 22 – Pretty Boy Floyd, American bank robber (shot by law officers) (b. 1904)
- October 24 – Giacomo Montalto, Italian socialist leader and politician (b. 1864)
- October 29 – Lou Tellegen, Dutch actor (b. 1881)

=== November ===
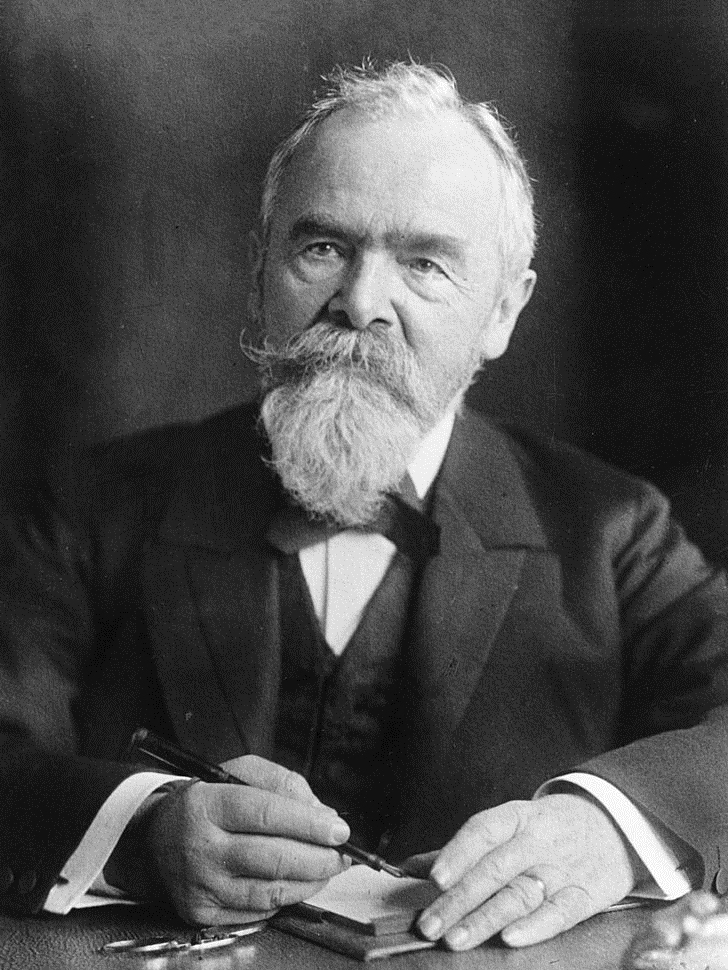
Carl von Linde

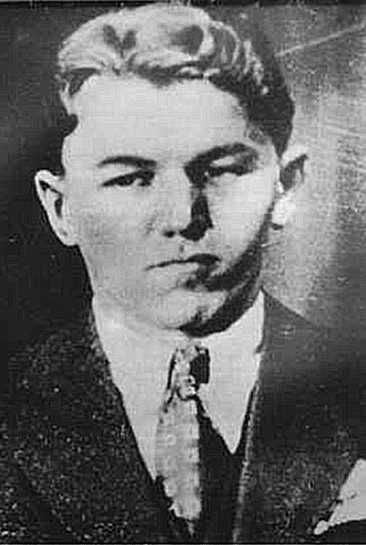
Baby Face Nelson

- November 2 – Edmond James de Rothschild, French philanthropist (b. 1845)
- November 3 – Sir Robert McAlpine, Scottish builder (b. 1847)
- November 8 – James Mark Baldwin, American philosopher and psychologist (b. 1861)
- November 16
  - Alice Liddell, English inspiration for Alice's Adventures in Wonderland (b. 1852)
  - Carl von Linde, German scientist and engineer (b. 1842)
  - Georgi Todorov, Bulgarian general (b. 1858)
- November 20 – Willem de Sitter, Dutch mathematician, physicist and astronomer (b. 1872)
- November 22 – Harry Steppe, American vaudeville performer (b. 1888)
- November 27 – Baby Face Nelson, American gangster (b. 1908)
- November 30 – Hélène Boucher, French aviator (b. 1908)

=== December ===
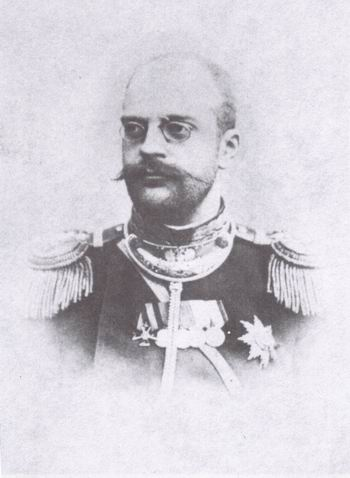
Charles Michael, Duke of Mecklenburg

- December 1
  - Sergey Kirov, Soviet politician (b. 1886)
  - Blind Blake, American blues singer (b. 1896)
- December 5 – Oskar von Hutier, German general (b. 1857)
- December 6 – Charles Michael, Duke of Mecklenburg, head of the House of Mecklenburg-Strelitz (b. 1863)
- December 9 – Alceste De Ambris, Italian syndicalist (b. 1874)
- December 26 – Wallace Thurman, American writer (b. 1902)
- December 28
  - Lowell Sherman, American actor and director (b. 1888)
  - Pablo Gargallo, Spanish sculptor and painter (b. 1881)

== Nobel Prizes ==

- Physics – Not awarded this year
- Chemistry – Harold Clayton Urey
- Physiology or Medicine – George Hoyt Whipple, George Richards Minot, William Parry Murphy
- Literature – Luigi Pirandello
- Peace – Arthur Henderson
