= Jules Renkin =

Belgian politician (1862–1934)

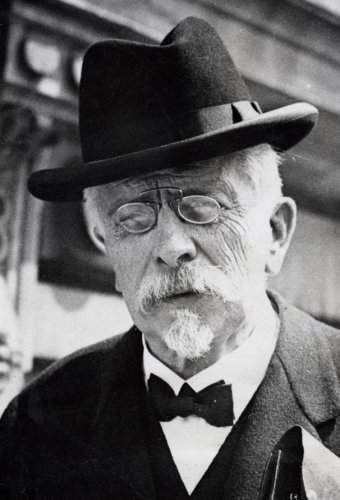
- Renkin in 1931

Prime Minister of Belgium
- In office 6 June 1931 – 22 October 1932
- Monarch: Albert I
- Preceded by: Henri Jaspar
- Succeeded by: Charles de Broqueville

Personal details
- Born: 3 December 1862 Ixelles, Belgium
- Died: 15 July 1934 (aged 71) Brussels, Belgium
- Party: Catholic Party

Jules Laurent Jean Louis Renkin (3 December 1862 – 15 July 1934) was a Belgian politician who served as Prime Minister from 1931 to 1932. He also served as the minister of colonies for the Belgian Congo from 30 October 1908 to 21 November 1918.

Born in Ixelles, Renkin studied and practised law, and helped found the journal L'Avenir Sociale. In 1896 he was elected as a member of the Catholic Party to the Belgian Chamber of Representatives for Brussels, a seat he held until his death. Original on the Christian Democratic wing of the party, Renkin's views became more conservative with time.

He held several ministerial posts, Justice in 1907–1908, Colonies from 1908 to 1918, the Interior in 1918–1920, and Railway and Posts from 1918 to 1921. In 1920 he was named an honorary minister of State.

In 1931 he became the prime minister of Belgium, also holding the Interior, Finance, and Health portfolios. His government was unable to deal effectively with the economic crisis facing Belgium at the time and fell in 1932. His term coincided with the general strike of July-September 1932.

He was married to Emma van Hamme.

== Honours ==
- Belgium: Minister of State by Royal Decree.
- Belgium: Grand Cross of the Order of Leopold, RD 1932.
- Belgium: Grand Cross of the Order of the African Star, RD 1921.
- Belgium: Grand Cross of the Order of the Crown
- France: Grand Cross of the Legion of Honour
- Grand Cross of the Order of Saint Gregory the Great, 1932.
- Spain: Grand Cross with Collar of the Order of Isabella the Catholic
- United Kingdom: Knight Grand Cross of the Order of the British Empire
- Italy: Grand Cross of the Order of the Crown of Italy
- Grand Cross of the Order of the Star of Romania
- Grand Cross of the Order of the Lion and the Sun
- Greece: Officer of the Order of the Redeemer

Political offices
Preceded by Henri Jaspar	Prime Minister of Belgium; 1931–1932	Succeeded by Charles de Broqueville
