= List of women's names for the Eiffel Tower =

Wikimania poster on the Eiffel Women

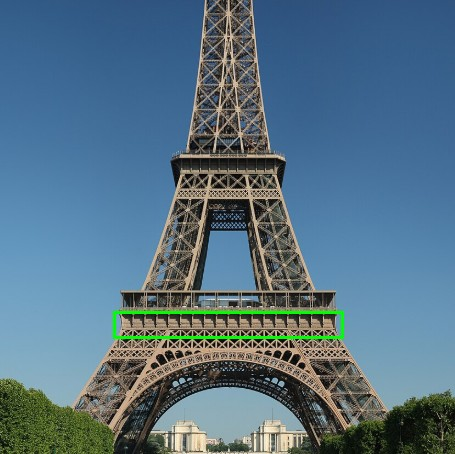
Location of names on the Eiffel Tower

The names of 72 female scientists have been selected for inclusion on the Eiffel Tower alongside the original names on the Eiffel Tower which included only men.

While the names of 72 male scientists were inscribed on the Eiffel Tower when it was constructed, there were no names of women. As a result, in 2025, Paris mayor Anne Hidalgo named a commission of experts to consider the project. The commission's report was positive and advocated inscribing the names of 72 female scientists adjacent to those of the 72 male scientists, to reflect full equality. The Association Femmes & Sciences was tasked with preparing a list of women scientists to be commemorated. In January 2026, the Association unveiled a proposed list of late 72 women scientists from 1789 to the present. In 2026, the list was awaiting acceptance by the mayor, the Académie des Sciences, the Académie des Technologies and the Académie nationale de médecine.

== Criteria and other names ==
The names were chosen based on a number of criteria. They had to have lived after 1789, which excluded the leading chemists Marie Meurdrac and Émilie du Châtelet. They could not have a name that was already on the tower, so this excluded Marie-Anne Paulze Lavoisier, whose first husband Antoine Lavoisier's name is one of the original men of science. Additionally, their name could not be too long, like Marie Geneviève Charlotte Thiroux d’Arconville. Rosalind Franklin was allowed exceptionally because of her association with France as the criteria had been that they should all be French.

== List ==
The following names were selected:

- Denise Albe-Fessard (1916–2003), French neuroscientist known for researching the central nervous system pain pathway
- Yvette Amice (1936–1993), French mathematician investigating the areas of number theory and p-adic analysis.
- Jeanne Baret (1740–1887). French explorer, the first woman to have completed a voyage of circumnavigation
- Denise Barthomeuf (1934–2004), French chemist pioneering research on the structure of the zeolites mineral group
- Madeleine Brès (née Gebelin, 1842–1921), French pediatrician and the first French woman to obtain a medical degree
- Yvonne Choquet-Bruhat (1923–2021), French mathematical physicist confirming the mathematical validity of general relativity
- Simonne Caillère (1905–1999), French mineralogist who undertook extensive research on clays
- Yvette Cauchois (1908–1999), French physicist known for contributing to X-ray spectroscopy and X-ray optics
- Édmée Chandon (1885–1944), France's first female astronomer with a career at the Paris Observatory
- Marthe Condat (1886–1939), French physician and the first French woman with a professorship in medicine
- Anita Conti (née Caracotchian, 1899–1997). French-Armenian explorer and the first female oceanographer in France
- Radhia Cousot (née Rezig, 1947–2014), French computer scientist known for inventing abstract interpretation
- Eugénie Cotton (née Feytis, 1881–1967), French physicist, socialist and educator, honoured for her peace and women's rights advocacy
- Odile Croissant (1923–2020), French biologist known for developing techniques for detecting viral nucleic acids
- Marie Curie (née Skłodowska, 1867–1934), Polish and naturalized-French physicist and chemist remembered for investigating radioactivity and winning two Nobel prizes
- Augusta Dejerine-Klumpke (1859–1927), American-born French medical doctor known for her work in neuroanatomy
- Henriette Delamarre de Monchaux (1854–1911), French naturalist and paleontologist specializing in faluns
- Georgette Délibrias (1924–2015), French physicist who pioneered the technique of radiocarbon dating
- Nathalie Demassieux (née Filatoff, 1884–1961), Russian-born French chemist and academic specializing in mineral chemistry
- Cécile DeWitt-Morette (1922–2017), French mathematician and physicist remembered for founding the Les Houches School of Physics
- Rose Dieng-Kuntz (1956–2008), Senegalese computer scientist in France who contributed to knowledge sharing and the semantic web
- Marie-Louise Dubreil-Jacotin (1905–1972), French mathematician and researcher, the first woman to become a full professor of mathematics, remembered for her contributions to fluid mechanics and abstract algebra
- Angélique du Coudray (1714–1794). influential, pioneering French midwife
- Louise du Pierry (1746–1807). French astronomer and first female professor at the Sorbonne, remembered for her contributions to positional astronomy and astronomic tables
- Jacqueline Ferrand (1918–2014), French mathematician working on conformal representation theory, potential theory, and Riemannian manifolds
- Jacqueline Ficini (1923–1988), French chemist remembered for initiating and developing the synthetic chemistry of ynamines
- Rosalind Franklin (1920–1958), English chemist and X-ray crystallographer contributing to the understanding of the molecular structures of DNA
- Marthe Gautier (1925–2022), French medical doctor known for working on chromosome abnormalities and investigating the causes of the Down syndrome
- Sophie Germain (1776–1831), French mathematician and physicist who contributed to the understanding of elasticity theory
- Nicole Girard-Mangin (1878–1919), French medical doctor, the first to serve in the French Army, also a specialist in tuberculosis
- Marianne Grunberg-Manago (1921–2013), Russian-born French biochemist, major contributor to work on the nature of the genetic code
- Jeanne Guiot (1889–1963), French engineer specializing in metallurgy and working on the development of special steels
- Geneviève Guitel (1895–1982), French mathematician noted for her work on the history of numeral systems
- Sébastienne Guyot (1896–1941), French engineer specializing in aerodynamic flying and contributing to aircraft designs
- Claudine Hermann (née Rodrigues, 1945–2021), French physicist and researcher, the first woman to serve as professor at the École Polytechnique Féminine
- Andrée Hoppilliard (1909–1995), French aeronautical engineer who helped design light aircraft for the Gaucher company
- Irène Joliot-Curie (1897–1956), French chemist and physicist, Nobel Prize in chemistry with her husband for the discovery of induced radioactivity
- Geneviève Jourdain (1945–2006), French engineer and academic, played a prominent role in the development of signal processing
- Anne-Marcelle Kahn (née Schrameck, 1896–1965), French engineer, the first woman to graduate from the French School of Mining in Saint-Étienne
- Dorothea Klumpke (1861–1942), American astronomer, first woman doctorate at the Sorbonne, director at the Paris observatory
- Lydie Koch-Miramond (1931–2023), French astrophysicist at the French CEA, discoverer of galactic cosmic rays
- Colette Kreder (née James, 1934–2022), French engineer and feminist, created the Demain la Parité network and Femmes & Sciences in support of women in science
- Nicole Laroche (née Schrottenloher, 1945–2019), French engineer, the first woman to attend the elite ENSAM engineering school
- Cornélie Lebon-de Brambilla (1767–1812), French engineer, she invented a process for distilling gas from wood for gas lighting
- Yolande Le Calvez (née Roman, 1910–2001). French palaeontologist and geological engineer, specialising in foraminifera and their use in biostratigraphy
- Paulette Libermann (1919–2007), French mathematician and academic, specializing in differential geometry, global analysis, and G-structures
- Henriette Mathieu-Faraggi (1915–1985), French nuclear physicist known for her contributions to French nuclear research
- Édith Mourier (1920–2017), French mathematician, specialising in probability theory and remembered for the Fortet–Mourier distance
- Ethel Moustacchi (1933–2016), Egyptian-born French geneticist, a leading figure in molecular biology and radiobiology research
- Suzanne Noël (1878–1954), French plastic surgeon, the world's first female plastic surgeon
- Yvonne Odic (1890–1983), French mechanical engineer remembered for developing special steels during the First World War
- Isabelle Olivieri (1957–2016), French agricultural engineer and biologist, specialising in genetics and population biology
- Marie-Louise Paris (1889–1969), French engineer who founded the l'Institut électro-mécanique féminin, now the EPF School of Engineering.
- Marguerite Perey (1909–1975), French physicist who discovered the element francium
- Claudine Picardet (née Poullet, 1735–1820), French chemist, mineralogist, meteorologist, and scientific translator
- Alberte Pullman (née Bucher, 1920–2011), French quantum chemist remembered for her investigations into the properties of carcinogenic aromatic hydrocarbons
- Pauline Ramart (née Lucas, 1880–1953), chemist and a politician, active in organic chemistry
- Lucie Randoin (née Fandard, 1888–1960), French biologist, a pioneering contributor to the emerging discipline of nutrition
- Alice Recoque (née Arnaud, 1929–2021), French computer scientist known for designing minicomputers and researching artificial intelligence
- Michelle Schatzman (1949–2010). French analyst and mathematician, specializing in topics related to nonlinear analysis and numerical analysis
- Marie-Hélène Schwartz (née Lévy, 1913–2013), French mathematician, known for her work on characteristic numbers of spaces with singularities
- Josiane Serre (1922–2004), French academic and chemist. a French pioneer of quantum chemistry
- Alice Sollier (née Maille, 1861–1942). French medical doctor, the first black woman to qualify as a medical doctor.
- Hélène Sparrow (1891–1970), Polish medical doctor and bacteriologist who helped to control epidemics and developed vaccines
- Bianca Tchoubar (1910–1990), French Ukrainian chemist specializing in reaction mechanisms
- Marie-Antoinette Tonnelat (née Baudot, 1912–1980), French theoretical physicist focusing on relativistic quantum mechanics under the influence of gravity
- Thérèse Tréfouël (née Boyer, 1892–1978), French researcher specializing in medicinal chemistry, especially on sulfonamides
- Agnes Ullmann (1928–2019), Hungarian-French microbiologist known for investigating the ailosteric properties of muscle-specific proteins
- Arlette Vassy (née Tournaire, 1913–2000), French geophysicist specializing in atmospheric ozone
- Suzanne Veil (1886–1956), French chemical engineer known for her research and for training nurses in using radiology to find shrapnel
- Jeanne Villepreux-Power (1794–1871), French marine biologist known for inventing aquaria for experimenting with aquatic organisms
- Toshiko Yuasa (1909–1980), Japanese nuclear physicist known advancing nuclear physics and fostering scientific collaboration between Japan and France

== See also ==
- List of names on the Eiffel Tower
