= De Dion =

De Dion may refer to:

- Jules-Albert de Dion (1856–1946), automobile pioneer
- Henri de Dion (1828–1878), engineer
- de Dion-Bouton, automobile manufacturer
- de Dion tube, automobile suspension (vehicle)
