= Denise Barthomeuf =

French chemist and researcher (1934–2004)

- Born: 26 November 1934; Lyon, France
- Died: November 26, 2004 (aged 70); Saint-Cyr-au-Mont-d'Or, France
- Education: University of Lyon
- Known for: Work on zeolites
- Scientific career
- Fields: Chemistry
- Workplaces: French National Centre for Scientific Research, Rhône-Poulenc, Exxon
- Thesis: Contribution à l'étude des propriétés acides des gels mixtes silice-alumine (1962)
- Doctoral advisor: Marcel Prettre

Denise Marie Barthomeuf (26 November 1934 – 2 November 2004) was a French chemist. She was known for her pioneering research on the structure of the zeolites mineral group. She created models to demonstrate the structure of zeolites and facilitate understanding of their use as catalysts. She founded and led the organisation dedicated to zeolites. In 2026, Barthomeuf was announced as one of women in STEM whose names are destined to be added to the 72 men already celebrated on the Eiffel Tower.

== Early life and education ==
Denise Marie Barthomeuf was born to Madeleine (née Gallet) and Jean Baptiste Barthomeuf on 26 November 1934 in Lyon. She took her degree in science at the University of Lyon in 1960 and her Ph.D in Chemistry in 1962 under the supervision of Marcel Prettre.

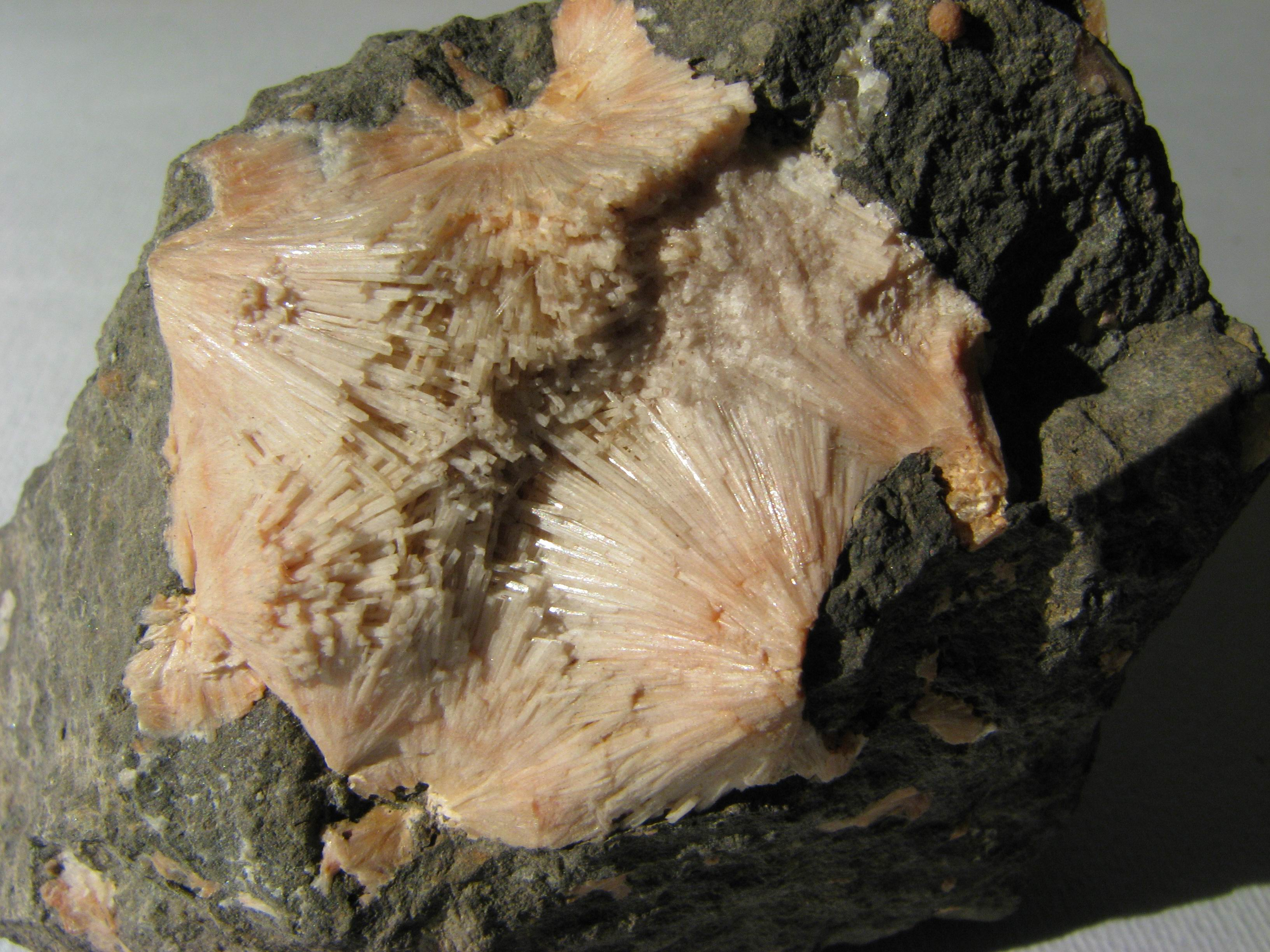
Example of a zeolite.

== Career ==
In 1958, Barthomeuf began her career at the Faculté des sciences de Lyon as an assistant in Professor Marcel Prettre's laboratory. She was promoted to senior assistant in 1964.

Her early years of research focussed on the study of catalytic cracking catalysts. Her first academic contribution was at the International Catalysis Congress in Paris in 1960, where she presented a paper on the influence of several novel physical-chemical properties on the cracking activity of silica-alumina catalysts.

Whilst her research initially focused on catalytic cracking catalysts, after spending eight months at Moscow State University, in the laboratory run by professor Klawdija Wassiljewna Toptschijewa, she turned her attention to zeolites in the 1960s.

In the later 1960s, Barthomeuf was the first to identify the importance and role of the composition and spatial organisation of the atoms that make up the microporous materials in determining the properties of zeolites. This led her to develop methods for modifying zeolites, which had a strong impact in the field, including the introduction of dealuminated zeolites in catalytic cracking.

Barthomeuf joined the French National Centre for Scientific Research (CNRS) in 1974. She also worked in industry for eight years in three different roles, at Rhône-Poulenc; Liha; then Exxon in the United States where she focused on basic zeolites, aluminophosphates and separation processes. She worked at three CNRS laboratories: both the Institute for Research on Catalysis and the Organic Catalysis Laboratory in Villeurbanne, and later at the Surface Reactivity Laboratory in Paris.

Barthomeuf conceptualised the relationships between the properties of zeolites, their acidity and their catalytic behaviour. In the 1980s, she published a series of articles and lectured on the topological density of aluminium atoms in networks. She developed a predictive model defining the optimum acidity and activity for each structure. She enriched the model, accounting for the existence of electrostatic field gradients within the cavities, and explaining the changes in selectivity in hydrocarbon cracking reactions as a function of pore composition and size. These concepts were integrated into the study of zeolites.

Barthomeuf founded the Groupe français des Zéolithes (GFZ), which she chaired until 1990. She was vice-chair of the International Zeolite Association and chaired their Breck Award Committee from 1986 to 1989.

Her laboratory work and her collaboration with industry in France and the United States significantly contributed to an improved understanding of catalysis and reactivity, especially in relation to zeolites and other catalytic materials. Together with the mathematician Michelle Schatzman, she was one of two Eiffel Women closely associated with the Univeristy of Lyon I.

== Retirement ==
Barthomeuf retired in 1995 and earned a masters degree in archaeology, developing an interest in the manufacture of early alloys. She also became involved in archaeology and humanitarian work with disadvantaged communities in Nepal. Nevertheless, she continued to write papers on her main interest, zeolites and related minerals. Her last publication, "Si,Al Ordering and Basicity Clusters in Faujasites" appeared in Journal of Physical Chemistry in December 2004.

Barthomeuf died aged 69 on 2 November 2004 in Saint-Cyr-au-Mont-d'Or, a suburb of Lyon.

== Honours and awards ==
In 1985, Barthomeuf was awarded the CNRS Silver Medal

Since 2017, the international Denise Barthomeuf Prize has been awarded by the Groupe français de Zéolithes (GFZ) for PhD theses in the field of zeolites or related materials. Under the sponsorship of Micromeritics, an award of 400 euros is presented to winners at the annual meeting of the GFZ.

In 2026, Denise Barthomeuf was announced as one of 72 historical women in STEM whose names have been proposed to be added to the 72 men already celebrated on the Eiffel Tower. The plan was conceived by a student and tour guide named Bernard Rigaud and it was taken up by Sorbonne University's President Nathalie Drach-Temam. and it was announced by the Mayor of Paris, Anne Hidalgo following the recommendations of a committee led by Isabelle Vauglin of Femmes et Sciences and Jean-François Martins, representing the operating company which runs the Eiffel Tower.

== Selected publications ==
- 1961: Influence of several novel physical-chemical properties on the cracking activity of silica-alumina catalysts, Proceedings Intern. Congr. Catalyse, Paris
- 1962: Contribution à l'étude des propriétés acides des gels mixtes silice-alumine, Lyon, Faculté des sciences de l'université de Lyon.
- 1963: Contribution à l'étude des gels mixtes silice-alumine. Lyon, Faculté des sciences de l'université de Lyon.
- 1964: Si,Al ordering and basicity clusters in faujasite, published in the Journal of Physical Chemistry in December 2004

Researchgate records 143 publications by Barthomeuf.
