= Yolande Le Calvez =

French geologist, palaeontologist

- Born: Yolande Roman; 23 April 1910
- Died: 17 December 2001 (aged 91)
- Education: University of Paris
- Scientific career
- Fields: Geology; Paleontology; Geological engineering
- Workplaces: Bureau de Recherches Géologiques et Minières; CNRS
- Thesis: Contribution à l'étude des Foraminifères paléogènes du Bassin de Paris (1969)

Yolande Le Calvez (née Roman, 23 April 1910 – 17 December 2001) was a French geologist, palaeontologist and geological engineer, specialising in foraminifera and their use in biostratigraphy. She devoted her entire career to the study of both fossil and living foraminifera in relation to the oceanic ecosystem, using them as biostratigraphic markers.

In 1966, Le Calvez joined the French National Centre for Scientific Research (CNRS) and the Institute of Palaeontology (MNHN). She was described by a colleague as the "grande dame" of micropaleontology. She is one of 72 women in STEM whose names have been proposed to be added to the Eiffel Tower.

== Early life and education ==
Yolande Roman was born on 23 April 1910. In 1933, she married and unofficially assisted the prostistologist Jean Le Calvez who is remembered for his research into the reproductive cycles of foraminifera. She took her husband's surname Le Calvez and was known as Yolande Le Calvez professionally. Her 1970 doctoral thesis at the University of Paris focused on the Paleogene of the Paris Basin. Le Calvez, who had worked with the paleontologist Maurice Lys, was recruited by the CNRS to work in the laboratory at the École pratique des hautes études (EPHS).

== Career ==
In 1934, Le Calvez collaborated with her husband, Jean Le Calvez, a preparator at the Villefranche-sur-Mer Zoological Station, on the reproduction of foraminifera and the study of these micro-organisms in their natural environment.

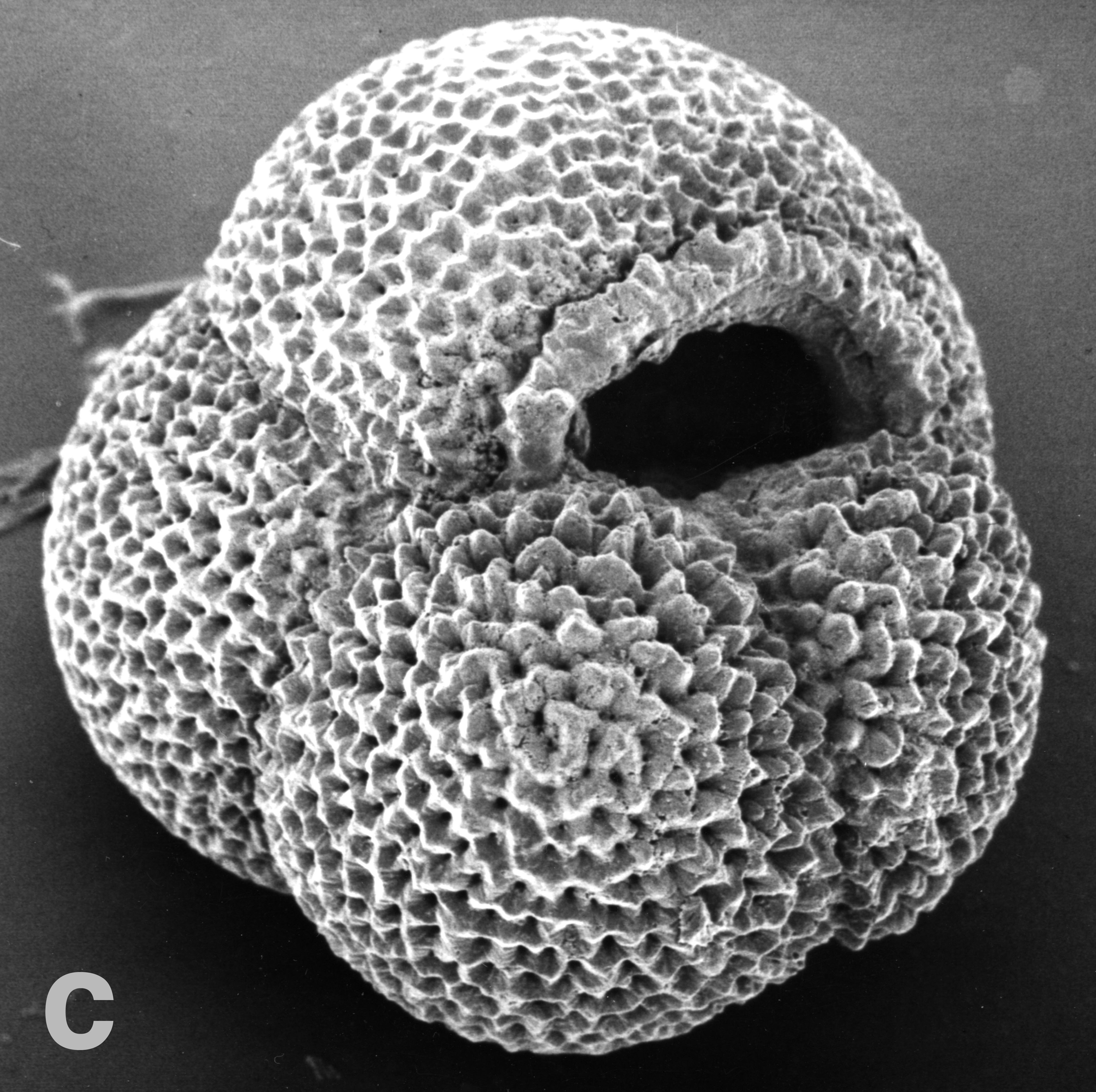
Macro photograph of a foram

In 1944, Le Calvez was recruited as a geological engineer for the Bureau de Recherche Géologiques et Géophysiques (later the Bureau de Recherches Géologiques et Minières or BRGM), where she worked with neurologist Pierre Marie. She revised the foraminifera collection and went on to head the micropalaeontology laboratory. When the BRGM moved to Orléans, Le Calvez joined the French National Centre for Scientific Research (CNRS) and the Institute of Palaeontology (MNHN) in 1966.

Working in the EPHE's Palaeontology building, from 1987 Le Calvez focused on studying and preserving the materials collected by the naturalist Alcide d'Orbigny (1802-1957). In 1972, she became head of the micropalaeontology laboratory, succeeding Marthe Deflandre-Rigaud, a position she held until her retirement in 1977. She continued her work promoting the collections of ancient authors and specialists in foraminifera and ostracods. She edited the Cahiers de Micropaléontologie journal during this period.

Le Calvez devoted her entire career to the study of both fossil and living foraminifera, single-celled organisms that maintain the balance of the oceanic ecosystem. She used them as biostratigraphic markers.

Aged 91, Yolande Le Calvez died on 17 December 2001 at Sarcelles in the French department of Val d'Oise.

== Honours ==
In 2026, Le Calvez was announced as one of 72 historical women in STEM whose names have been proposed to be added to the 72 men already celebrated on the Eiffel Tower. The plan was announced by the Mayor of Paris, Anne Hidalgo following the recommendations of a committee led by Isabelle Vauglin of Femmes et Sciences and Jean-François Martins, representing the operating company which runs the Eiffel Tower.

== Selected publications ==
An extensive list of publications by Yolande Le Calvez is available from IdRef: Among the most significant are:

- Révision des foraminifères lutétiens du bassin de Paris. Paris: Imprimerie. Nationale. 1947–1952..
- with J Le Calvez (1951). "Contribution à l'étude des foraminifères des eaux saumâtres.⟨hal-02529417⟩". Vie et Milieu: 237-254..
- "Les foraminifères de la mer celtique". Revue des Travaux de l'Institut des Pêches Maritimes. 22 (2): 148-211. 1958..
- with Berthois Leopold (1959). "Deuxième contribution a l'étude de la sédimentation dans le golfe de Gascogne". Revue des Travaux de l'Institut des Pêches Maritimes. 23 (3): 323-375..
- with I. de Klasz et L. Brun (1971). "Quelques foraminifères de l'Afrique occidentale". Revista española de micropaleontología. 3 (3): 305-326. ISSN 0556-655X..
- with Ivan de Klasz, Lelio Brun (1974). "Nouvelle contribution à la connaissance des microfaunes du Gabon". Revista española de micropaleontología. 6 (3): 381-400. ISSN 0556-655X..

Manuscripts and archival materials in connection with Le Calvez' work on micropaleontology are safeguarded in the Fonds Yolande Le Calvez held in the archives of the French Republic.

== Sources ==
- Saint Martin, Jean-Paul (2010). Le patrimoine paléontologique. GeoEcoMar. pp. 81–85, 296.
