= Théophile-Jules Pelouze =

French chemist

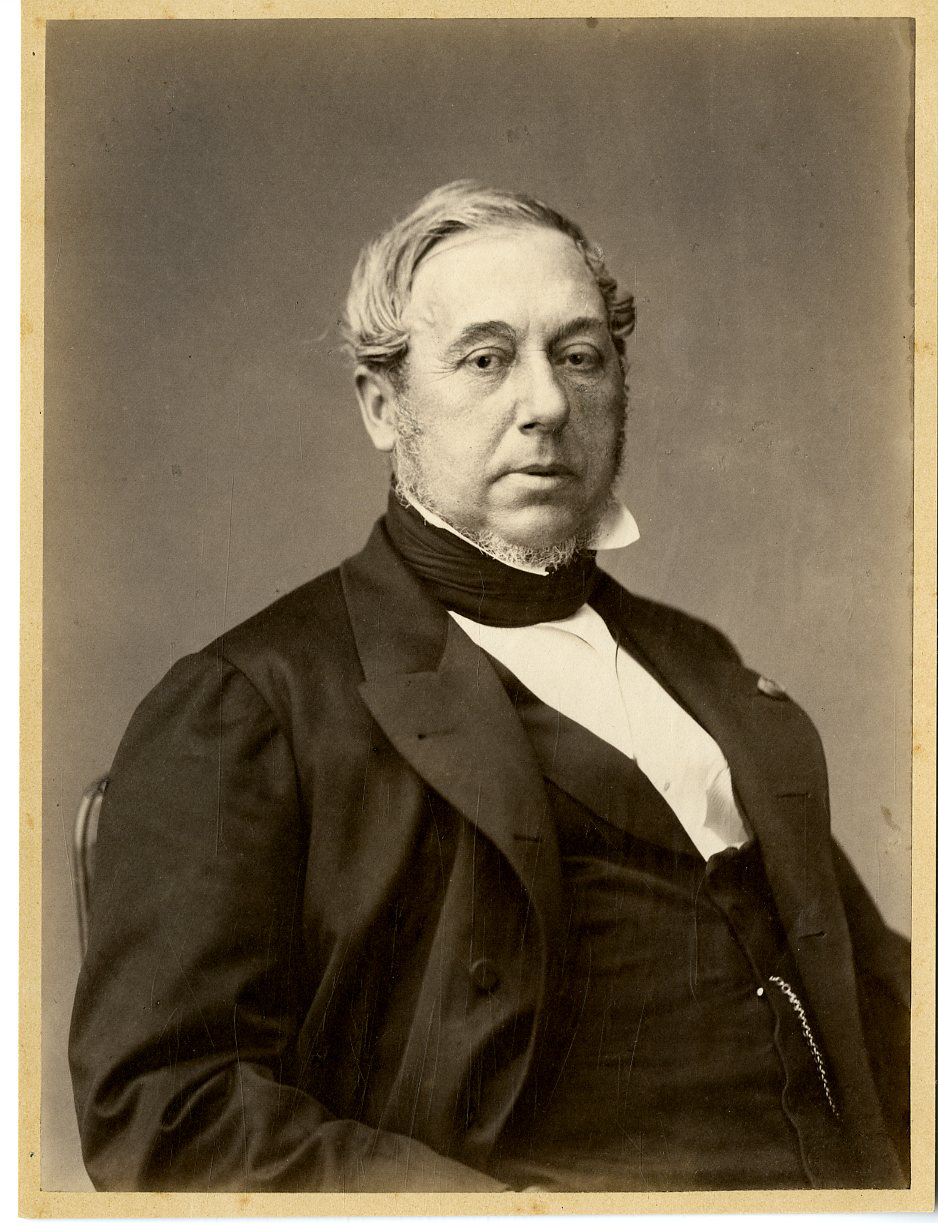
- Born: 26 February 1807; Valognes, France
- Died: 31 May 1867 (aged 60); Paris, France
- Scientific career
- Fields: Chemistry
- Thesis: Mémoire sur le tannin et les acides gallique, pyro-gallique, ellagique et méta-gallique (1836)

Théophile-Jules Pelouze (also known as Jules Pelouze, pronounced [pəluz]; 26 February 1807 – 31 May 1867) was a French chemist.

== Life ==
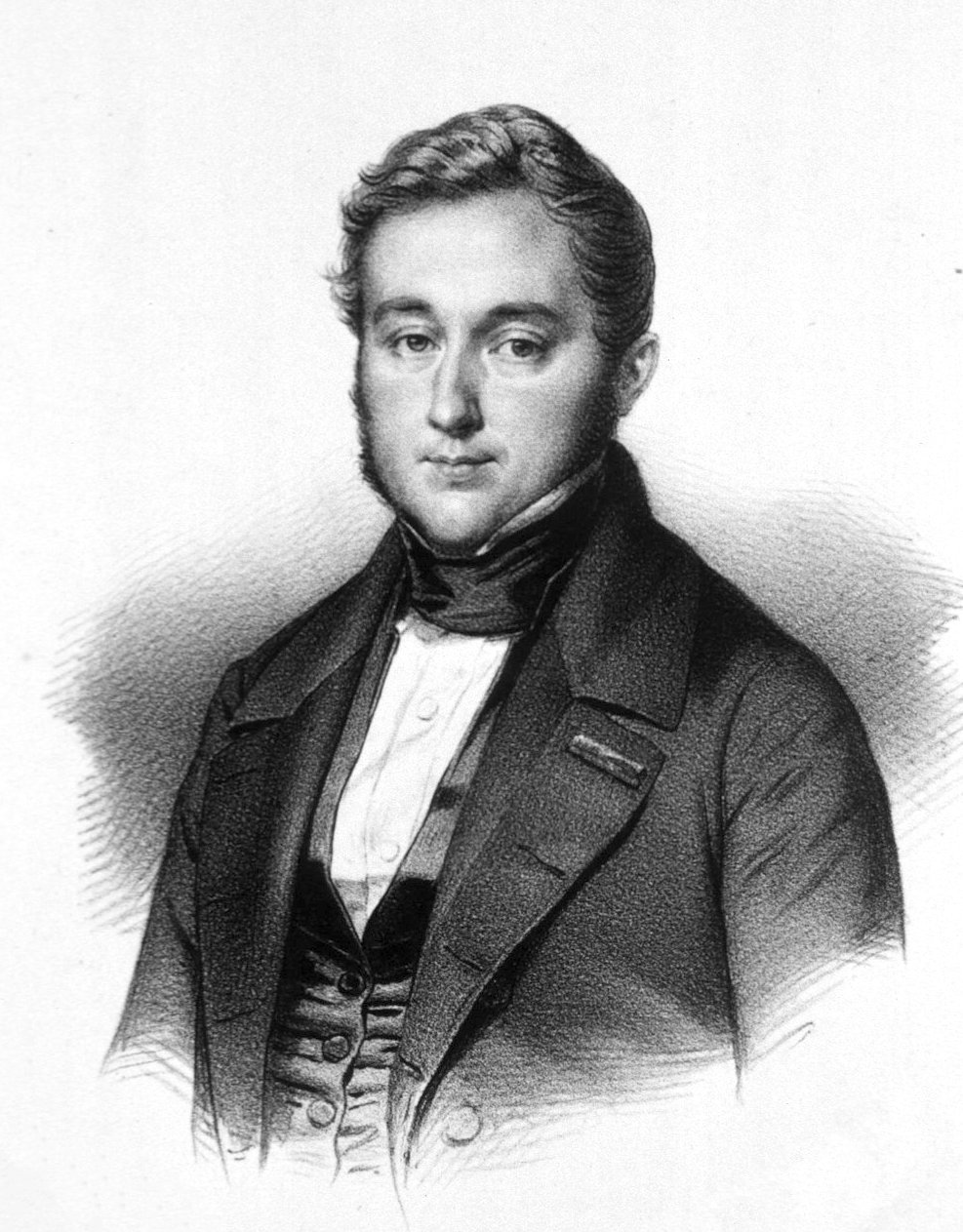
Théophile-Jules Pelouze

He was born at Valognes

His father, Edmond Pelouzef, was an industrial chemist and the author of several technical handbooks. The son, after spending some time in a pharmacy at La Fère acted as laboratory assistant to Gay-Lussac and Jean Louis Lassaigne at Paris from 1827 to 1829. In 1830 he was appointed associate professor of chemistry at Lille, but returning to Paris next year became repetiteur, and subsequently professor at the École polytechnique. He also held the chair of chemistry at the Collège de France, and in 1833 became assayer to the mint and in 1848 president of the Commission des Monnaies.

After the coup d'état in 1851 he resigned his appointments, but continued to conduct an experimental laboratory-school he had started in 1846. There he worked with the explosive material guncotton and other nitrosulphates. His student Ascanio Sobrero was the discoverer of nitroglycerin (1847), and another student, Alfred Nobel, was to take that discovery on to great heights in the form of commercial explosives including dynamite. He was a major inspiration for both students.

Though Pelouze made no discovery of outstanding importance, he was a busy investigator, his work including researches on salicin, on beetroot sugar, on various organic acids (gallic, malic, tartaric, butyric, lactic, etc.), on oenanthic ether (with Liebig), on the nitrosulphates, on guncotton, and on the composition and manufacture of glass.

He also carried out determinations of the atomic weights of several elements, and with Edmond Frémy, published Traité de chimie générale (1847–1850); Abrégé de chimie (1848); and Notions générales de chimie (1853).

His son Eugène-Philippe Pelouze married Marguerite Wilson, a rich heiress, in 1857. The couple purchased the Château de Chenonceau in 1864. Marguerite continued to live there until 1888, when she ran out of money and was forced to sell.

Pelouze died in Paris.

== Honours ==
His name is one of the 72 names inscribed on the Eiffel Tower.
