= Jules Petiet =

French mechanical engineer (1813–1871)

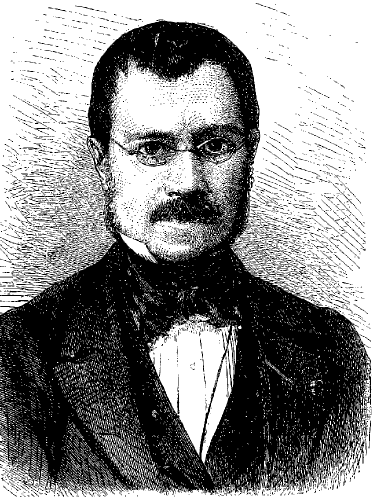
- Jules Alexandre Petiet
- Born: 5 August 1813
- Died: 29 January 1871 (aged 57)
- Education: École Centrale Paris
- Occupation: Mechanical Engineer
- Employer: Chemins de Fer du Nord

Jules Petiet (5 August 1813 – 29 January 1871) was a French mechanical engineer who worked on the early development of the French railway network. He was the Chief Engineer of the Chemins de fer du Nord from 1845, and became a locomotive engineer from 1848. From 1868 until his death, he was head of the prestigious engineering school École Centrale Paris, of which he was also a graduate.

Petiet's name is one of the 72 names inscribed on the Eiffel tower. A street in Paris, rue Petiet (at Épinettes, 17th district) is named in his honour.

== Locomotives ==
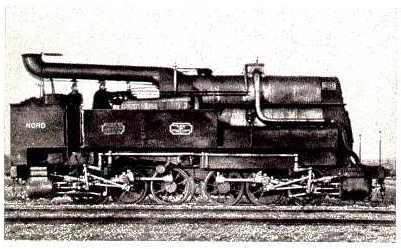
Petiet's Duplex 0-6-6-0T

Petiet expanded the fleet of Nord locomotives from 187 at his appointment in 1848 to 841 at his death in 1871.

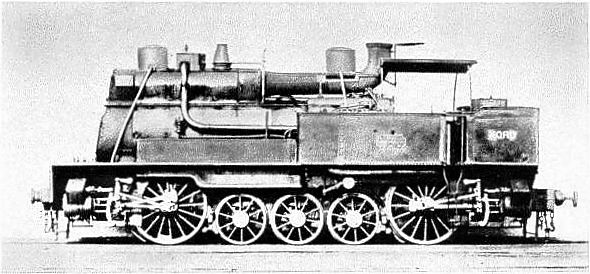
One of Petiet's "Camels" – Crampton-inspired tank locomotive

He designed a class of 0-8-0T locomotives known as Fortes Rampes; and built 20 even bigger 0-6-6-0 tank engines. Looking like a pair of 0-6-0s back-to-back, they had a long-rigid chassis. They were not as powerful as anticipated, and Petiet's successor rebuilt them into forty 0-6-0T locomotives.

He introduced the Crampton locomotive to the Nord (and France), and developed an A3A (0-2-6-2-0) Crampton-style tank locomotive. Nicknamed "Camels", eight were built, but they soon were sold to the Nord's Belgian subsidiary Nord-Belge.

== Bibliography ==
- Davies, John (January 1997). Chemins de fer du Nord Locomotive List 1842–1938. Sunnybank, Queensland: Dr. John Davies. pp. 2–26. ISBN 0-646-30938-2.

Business positions
Preceded by ?	Ingénieur en chef traction of the Chemins de Fer du Nord; 1848–1871	Succeeded by Edouard Delebecque
