= Jacques-Joseph Ebelmen =

French chemist

Jacques-Joseph Ébelmen
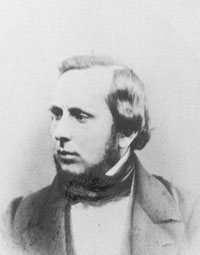
- Jacques-Joseph Ébelmen
- Born: 10 July 1814; Doubs, Baume-les-Dames, France
- Died: 31 March 1852 (aged 37); Sèvres, Paris, France
- Citizenship: French
- Education: Collège Royal Henry-Le-Grand; École Polytechnique
- Scientific career
- Fields: Metallurgy, Mining engineering

Jacques-Joseph Ébelmen (10 July 1814 – 31 March 1852) was a French chemist and mineralogist. He is also known for his work and study of porcelain and ceramics. He is also one of the earliest discoverers of the carbon cycle.

== Biography ==
=== Early life and education ===
He was the son of Claude Louis Ébelmen, a forest surveyor, and Jeanne Claude Grenier. He attended classes in grammar and literature at the Language School at Baume. Thereafter he grew interested in the Sciences and attended the elementary mathematics classes in Paris at Collège Royal Henry-Le-Grand, and applied mathematics at the Lycée de Besançon. He then enrolled at the École Polytechnique in 1831.

=== Career ===
In 1836 he was sent to Vesoul as a mining engineer, and began studying the different ores at Franche-Comté, where his reputation grew, growing artificial crystals of a number of minerals including corundum, chrysoberyl and peridot. He stayed there for four years, before committing himself in 1841 as assistant secretary of Committee of the Annales des Mines and a lecturer of chemistry at École Polytechnique. In December 1845 he became Chief Engineer of Mines of the Sèvres porcelain manufactory and worked on improved methods of manufacturing ceramics. He was also appointed professor of mineral assay at the Ecole des Mines in 1847. He made many improvements regarding the manufacture of porcelain such as the change from coal to wood stoves, the development of the casting, which resulted in large parts, a lightweight a blameless purity of form, the renovation of the manufacture of bone china and vitreous enamel on metal.

In 1848, he got the chair of Ceramics at the Conservatoire National des Arts et Métiers. In 1849, he was a member of the jury at the Central National Exhibition, and in 1851 he represented the French ceramic industry at the Great Exhibition in London, as a member of international jury. Whilst in England, his innovations drew esteem from the greatest scholars, including Michael Faraday, who invited him to attend a lecture he professed before the Royal Institution in London.

A few months after his return to France and the drafting of his report on the Exhibition, Ébelmen was suffering from a brain fever. He died on 31 March 1852.

== Research ==
His early research metallurgical dates from 1838, from a series of very remarkable memoirs succeeded until 1844, while others appeared only in 1851. To determine the composition of the gases successively in blast furnaces, kilns in a puddle in the warming ovens, he was inventing special processes, to draw the gas mixture in warmer regions and most easily accessible, and applied the same methods to study the carbonization of wood in the wheels, to that of the carbonization of coal in coke ovens and review of combustion in the engine locomotives homes alongside Frédéric Sauvage. He was a pioneer in the study of the chemical weathering of silicate minerals and basaltic rocks by carbonic acid. From his analysis of the decomposition products of weathered rocks and their sediments, Ébelmen proposed (1845, 1847, 1848) the existence of a deep carbon cycle in which volcanic gases return to the atmosphere and ocean the carbon dioxide buried in organic remains and carbonate rocks. This work was largely forgotten for 150 years, until it was rediscovered and promoted by Robert Berner of Yale University.

== Honours and awards ==
Ébelmen was made a Knight of the Legion of Honor by King Louis-Philippe in April 1847

Ébelmen is one of the 72 names inscribed on the Eiffel Tower.

The Ébelmen Award in Geochemistry, given out by the International Association of GeoChemistry, is named in his honour.
