= Jacques Triger =

French geologist who invented the pressurised caisson (1801–1867)

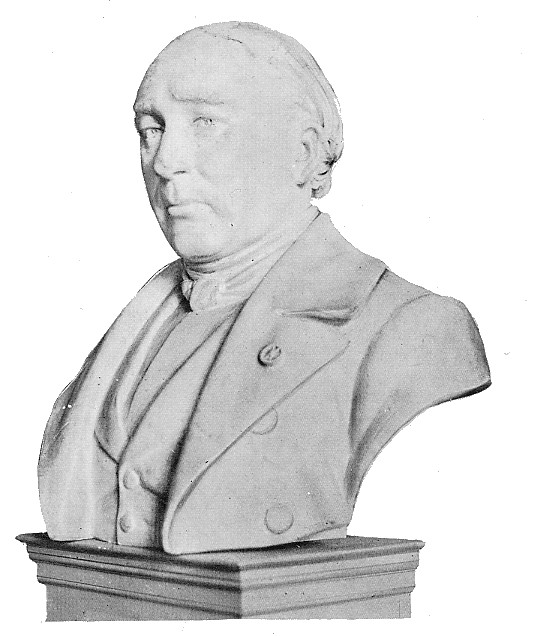
- Bust on Triger
- Born: 10 March 1801; Mamers, France
- Died: 16 December 1867 (aged 66); Paris, France
- Scientific career
- Fields: Geology

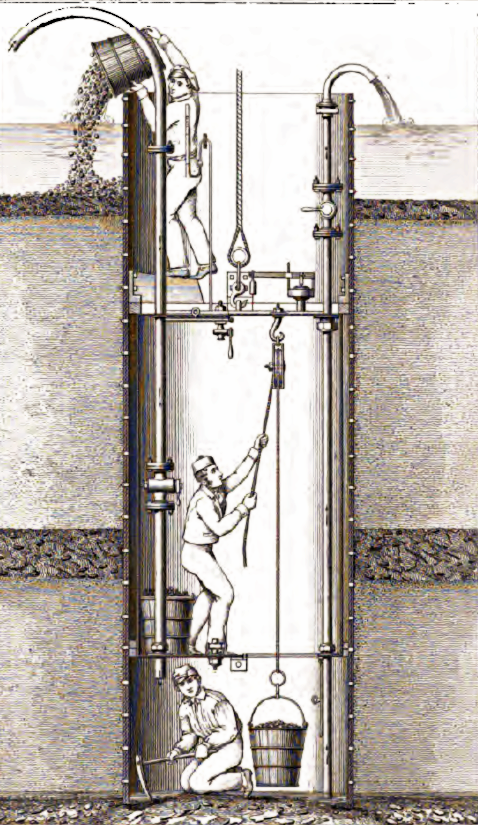
Representation of a pneumatic caisson, devised by Triger, dated 1846

Jacques Triger (French: [ʒak tʁiʒe]; 10 March 1801 – 16 December 1867) was a French geologist who invented the "Triger process" for digging through waterlogged ground using a pressurised caisson.

Triger was also deputy director of coal mining operations in Chalonnes-sur-Loire (Maine-et-Loire).

== Biography ==
Triger was born in Mamers, Sarthe, France, on 10 March 1801. He studied at La Flèche and then in Paris, where he met Louis Cordier in 1825. Cordier was an eminent French geologist, who taught Triger his first lessons in geology, where he quickly took interest in the technical challenges of this industrial sector. At 32 years old, together with skilled managers, Triger developed new industries in Sarthe and Mayenne. In this period, he developed and launched three coal mines, a paper mill and a sawmill.

In 1833, Triger was left by the woman he intended to marry. This plunged him deeply into his work: the production of gravel from dolomite rock, the construction of public fountains in Mamers and the detailed study of phreatic groundwater tables near Le Mans.

In 1834, Triger started the study and geological investigation of his region – Sarthe and Mayenne. These investigations and discussions with Louis Cordier drove him to Anjou (Maine-et-Loire), where coal was craft-mined. Thus, in 1839, Triger began to look at the Loire river and the way to reach solid rock underneath about 20 meters of waterlogged soil. After reading many articles on compressed air, he was convinced that he could use it to help dig through this layer of soil. He did not rely directly on the idea of using compressed air, but on the invention of the airlock – to pass from the pressurized zone of the caisson to the zone of atmospheric air pressure, and especially in finding a practical way to utilize the technique on an industrial scale. With the financial and administrative support of Emmanuel de Las Cases, five steel shaft linings were drilled by this invention, which was subsequently adapted and applied to dig foundations, bridges and many tunnels.

Helped by a liking for travel, Triger gradually established the first geological map of Sarthe County. After more than 20 years of research, the document was presented in 1853 at the Geological Society of France. The topographic background, support of the geological layers were designed by Triger himself. To design this document, he had to study all the fossils in his county and deal with some of the mysteries at that time, such as the structure of the Cretaceous terrain of Maine or the study of the Silurian-Devonian-Carboniferous lands in the west part of France.

Triger wanted the designation of the geological strata to be borrowed from paleontology (fossil names). He saw in this new system "the precious advantage of a universal language that one would understand everywhere, without comments and which would easily help the geologists from all regions of the globe to communicate". Triger would come to constitute regular geological cross-sections of the eastern France. This work was carried out by a team of geologists directed by Triger: geological sections from Paris to Brest, from Le Mans to Angers, from Paris to Rennes, and from Vendôme to Brest.

Triger was also a paleontologist, part of the first team to excavate the archaeological site of Roc-en-Paille (Chalonnes-sur-Loire, Maine-et-Loire). His very large collection of rocks, fossils and minerals is now displayed at the Museum of Natural History in Angers.

He collected many fossils, many of which carry the name "trigeri" in honor of Triger's efforts as a collector.

On 16 December 1867, Triger died from a heart attack after a meeting at the Geological Society of France, where he served for 35 years.

Triger's name is one of the 72 names inscribed on the Eiffel Tower.
