= Marthe Condat =

French physician (1886-1939)

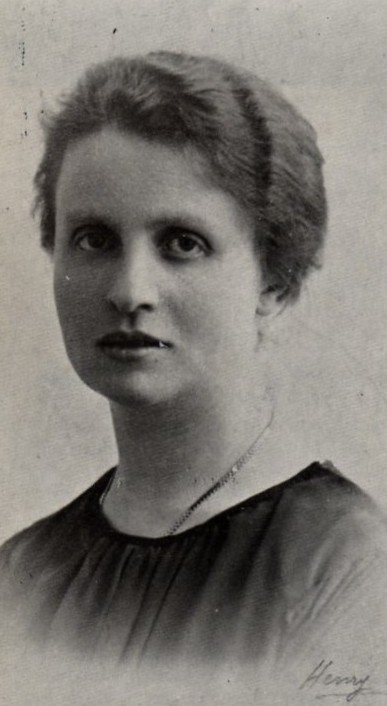
- Born: Marthe Louise Lydie Condat. 19 July 1886; Graulhet, France
- Died: 24 October 1939 (aged 53); Toulouse, France
- Occupations: physician and Professor
- Employer(s): Faculty of Medicine and Pharmacy in Toulouse
- Known for: first woman to hold a chair in French medicine

Signature
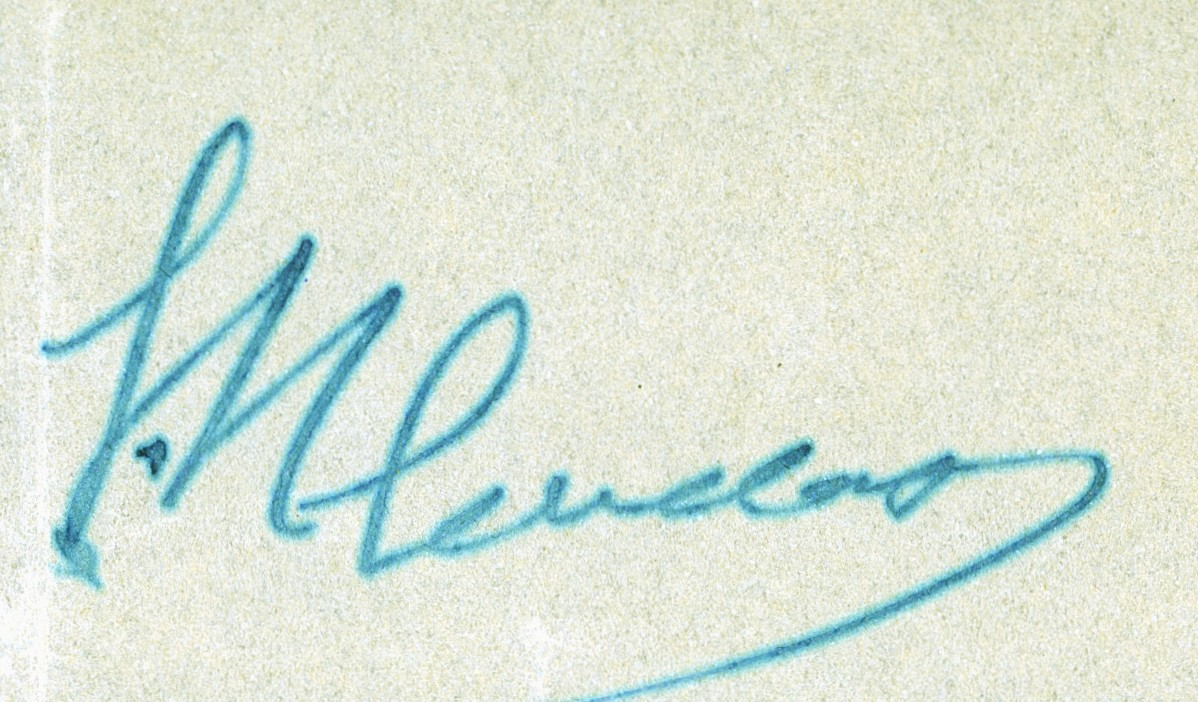

Marthe Louise Lydie Condat (French: [maʁt kɔ̃da]; July 18, 1886 – October 24, 1939) was a French physician. In 1923, she became the first woman to pass the competitive medical university teaching qualification known as the Agrégation de Médecine, and went on to became the first woman in France to receive a professorship with a chair in French medicine following her appointment at the Faculty of Medicine and Pharmacy in Toulouse. She has a street named after her in Paris and in 2026 it was announced that her name is to be added to the Eiffel Tower.

== Early life and education ==
Condat was born in Graulhet, Tarn on July 19, 1886. Her mother was Marie Athénaïs Victorine, a milliner and her father Georges Condat was a haberdasher.

Marie-Louise Roques, head of the Lafont boarding school for girls, commented on Condat's outstanding performance in the brevet examination, despite her young age. In 1903 Condat passed the literature baccalauréat with honours and the following year she passed the mathematics baccalauréat, also with honours. Her success story was covered by the Toulouse newspaper L'Express du Midi in July 1905.

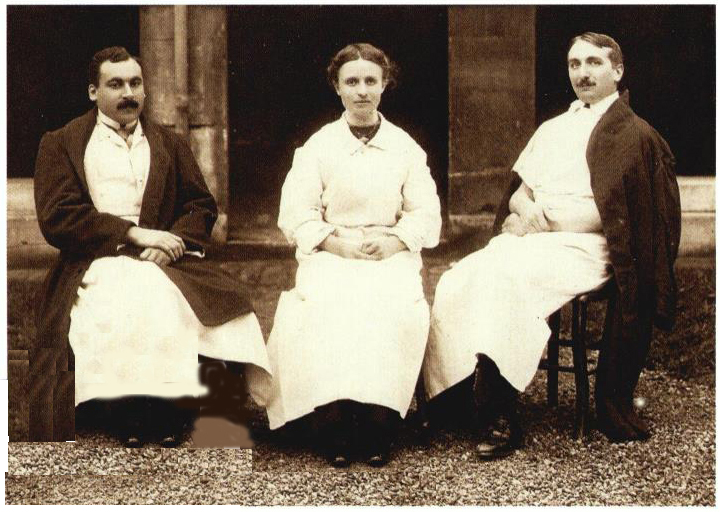
Condat was an intern for four years in Paris

In the PCN preparatory examination for entrance to university studies, Condat was the most successful candidate and went on to study in the Department of Medicine at the University of Toulouse, receiving the university's Adrien Gaussail scientific award in both 1906 and 1907.

In the second half of 1907, she was studying medicine at the University of Paris, where she took the external examination for Paris hospitals. On being accepted, she began work on 15 May 1908. In 1909, she prepared for the internal residency examination for Paris hospitals, succeeding as the third of 60 candidates.

== Career ==
Condat was an intern at the hospitals of Paris from May 1, 1910, to May 1, 1914. During the four-year residency, she specialised in pediatry. At the time, very few women were working in the medical profession in France and most were foreigners. From 1914 she worked in residency for a further five years at children's hospital Hôpital des Enfants Malades (the first pediatric hospital in the world) to compensate for the absence of male staff drafted for military service in World War I. Thanks to her untiring involvement and total lack of vacations, the hospital was able to function normally during the war years. As a result, she was awarded the Honorary Public Assistance Medal (Médaille d'Honneur d'Assistance Publique) for this work as well as the Medical Academy award (Prix de l'Académie de Médicine).

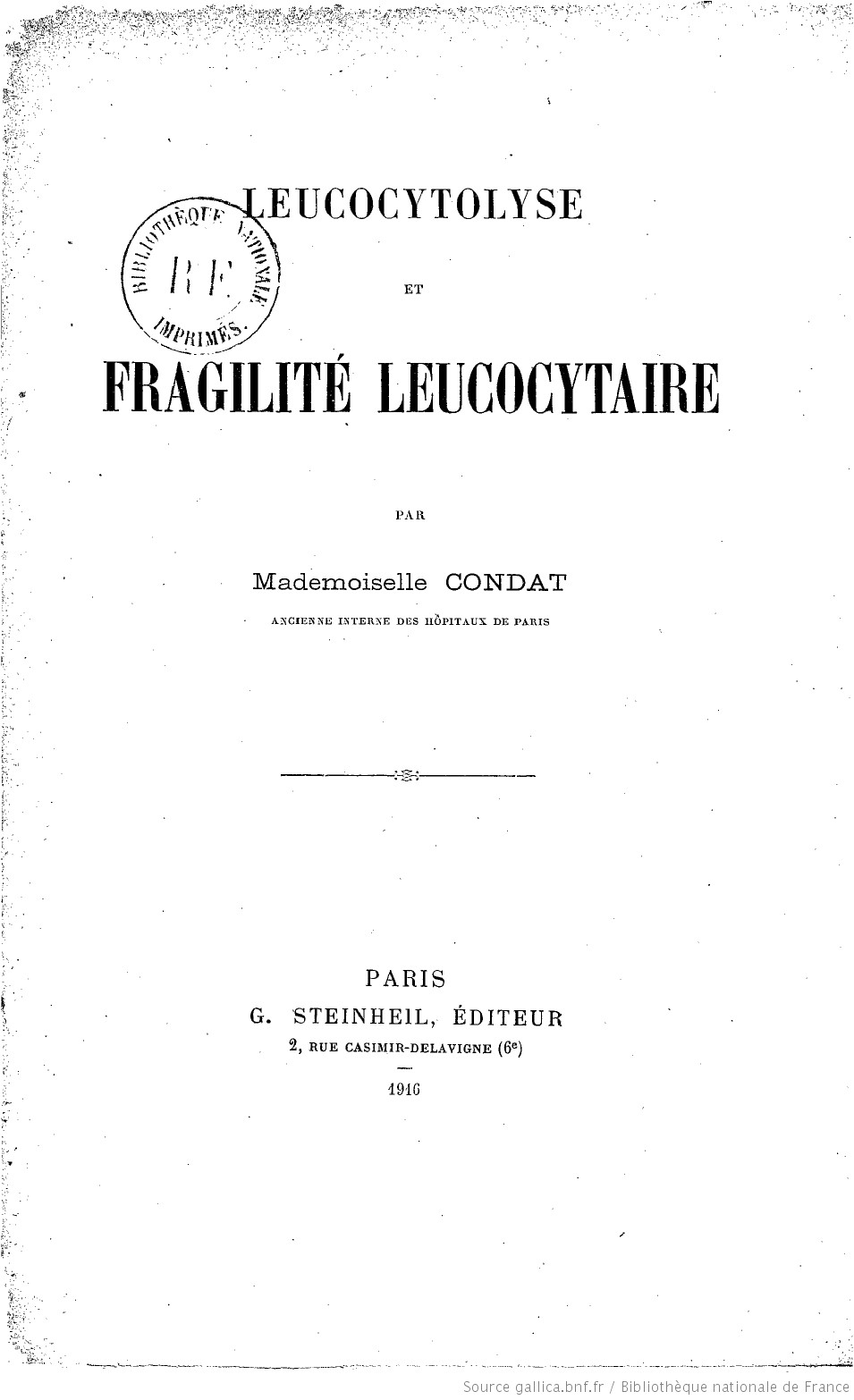
Marthe Condat's thesis - Leucocytolyse et fragilité leucocytaire - 1916

In parallel with her residency in a children's hospital, Condat successfully defended her doctoral thesis "Leucocytolyse et fragilité leucocytaire" (Leukocytolysis and leukocytic fragility) in 1916, for which she was awarded the Department of Medicine's silver medal (médaille d’argent de la Faculté). Considered to be an important work, the thesis was based on 115 observations she had collected at the children's hospital.

In 1920, now aged 34, Condat returned to Toulouse as head of the laboratory for sick children. In 1923, she became the first woman in France to pass the competitive Agrégation de médecine, an examination for those wishing to teach at university level. In so doing, she became the first woman to hold a French chair of medicine when in 1932 she received a professorship at the Faculty of Medicine and Pharmacy in Toulouse. She was promoted to professor of pediatric medicine in 1936.

== Death and legacy ==
Condat died in Toulouse on October 24, 1939, aged 53.

In July 2023, the Paris City Council named a street in the 12th arrondissement after her: the Cité Marthe-Condat.

She was one of six women honoured in an exhibition by Haute-Garonne Departmental Council in 2023.

In Toulouse, an auditorium at the Paul Sabatier University is named after Condat.

In 2026, Condat was announced as one of 72 historical women in STEM whose names have been proposed to be added to the 72 men already celebrated on the Eiffel Tower. The plan was announced by the Mayor of Paris, Anne Hidalgo following the recommendations of a committee led by Isabelle Vauglin of Femmes et Sciences and Jean-François Martins, representing the operating company which runs the Eiffel Tower.

== Publications ==
- Leucocytolyse et fragilité leucocytaire.
