= François Clément Sauvage =

French geologist and mining engineer

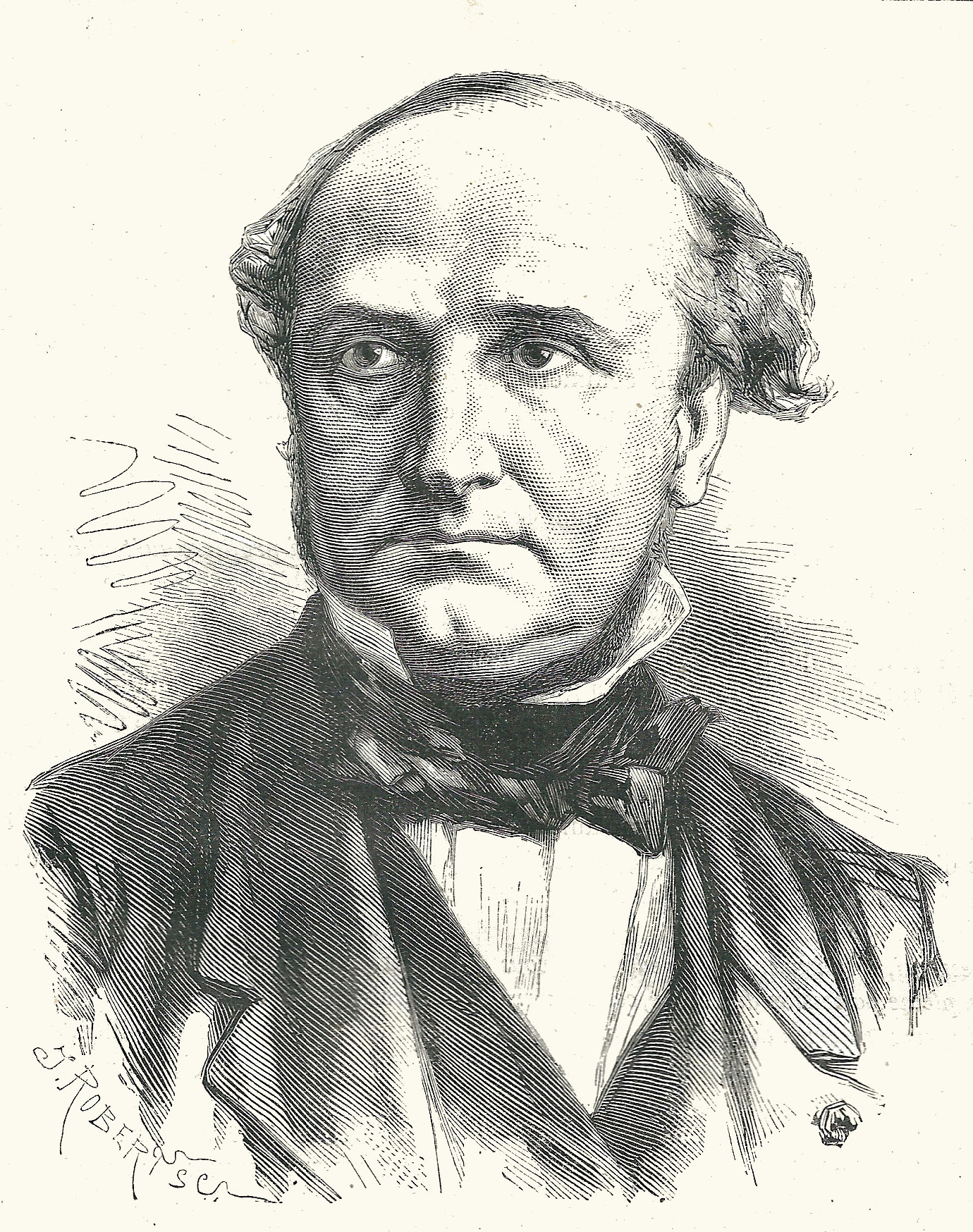
François Clément Sauvage

François Clément Sauvage was a French geologist and mining engineer. He was born in Sedan on 4 April 1814 and died in Paris on 11 November 1872.

Sauvage's name is one of the 72 names on the Eiffel Tower.
