= Charles Combes =

French engineer

Charles Pierre Mathieu Combes
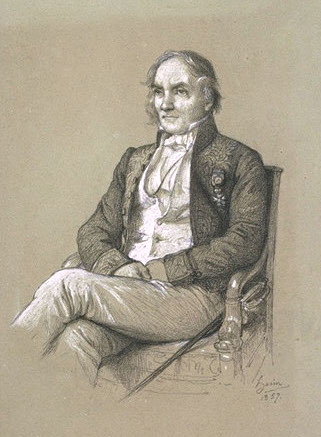
- Charles Pierre Mathieu Combes
- Born: 26 December 1801
- Died: 11 January 1872 (aged 70)
- Occupation: French Engineer
- Spouse: Louise Paulin Bousquet
- Awards: Legion of Honour – Commander (1860)

Charles Pierre Mathieu Combes (26 December 1801 – 11 January 1872) was a French engineer. He was Inspector-General of Mines and the Director of the School of Mines in Paris. His name is on the Eiffel Tower.

== Biography ==
=== Early life ===
Charles-Pierre-Mathieu Combes was born on 26 December 1801 in Cahors. His father was a senior policeman named Pierre Combes Mathieu. He joined the Ecole Polytechnique before the usual starting age of seventeen on 1 September 1817 and completed his studies in 1820 when he was admitted to the School of Mines. Combes completed the three-year course in just two years. He graduated on 1 July 1822.

=== Career ===
In 1825 he became a teacher of mathematics at the Ecole de Saint-Etienne, a post he held for two years. He then worked in industry but returned to the Saint-Etienne school in 1827 and stayed until 1831.

In 1832 he started at the School of Mines in Paris.

Combes' wife Louise Pauline (born Bousquet) died young in 1841.

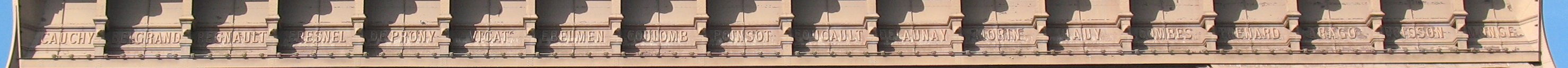
The 'Champ de Mars' side of the 1st floor of the Eiffel Tower, showing 18 of the 72. Combes is 14th on this side (move slider)

As the manager of the Firminy colliery, Combes took a special interest in the question of underground mine ventilation at which he became an expert and which, according to A. de Lapparent,

was to keep him busy for the rest of his career.

Combes took an interest in his students. A young Marcel Deprez failed to complete the course at the School of Mines. He must have made a good impression as he was employed as Combes' secretary. Deprez went on to show that electricity could be transmitted over long distances.

He has been recognised as a model of what is now called a consultant engineer. He was called on to arbitrate in disputes. He ruled on the ventilation of the mines in Belgium as well as advising foundries and collieries.

In 1868 he chaired the General Council of Mines.

=== Death ===
Combes died in Paris in 1872 and left a son and two daughters. One of his daughters married the chemist Charles Friedel. He was buried with his wife, Louise Pauline. Pierre Antoine Combes (1831–72) shares the same grave.

== Awards ==
He was given a number of honours. By decree on 16 August 1860, Combes achieved the rank of Commander in France's Legion of Honour awards system. In 1868, he was awarded the Italian Commander of the Order of St. Maurice and Lazarus and he was made a Commander of the Order of Leopold of Belgium.

== Legacy ==
Combes was one of seventy-two people whom Gustav Eiffel chose as people who had made his achievement of building the Eiffel Tower possible. Combes is number fifty in this list. His name is on the side opposite the military academy.
