= Édith Mourier =

French mathematician (1920–2017)

- Born: 21 December 1920; Cherbourg, France
- Died: 19 December 2017 (aged 96); Paris, France
- Education: Sorbonne University
- Known for: Fortet–Mourier distance Mourier theorem
- Scientific career
- Fields: Probability theory
- Workplaces: CNRS
- Thesis: Éléments aléatoires dans un espace de Banach (1952)

Édith Mourier (21 December 1920 - 19 December 2017) was a French mathematician, specialising in probability theory. She is remembered in particular for the Fortet–Mourier distance, used to quantify the difference between two measurements.

In 1952, Mourier was appointed director of research at French National Centre for Scientific Research (CNRS). After defending her doctoral thesis, Mourier was appointed director of research at the CNRS until 1956 when she became a lecturer at the University of Poitiers, then at the University of Paris from 1967 to 1987. For the remainder of her career she was active in the LPMA laboratory.

== Early life and education ==
Édith Marguerite Pauline Mourier was born on 21 December 1920 in Cherbourg. She studied mathematics at the Sorbonne.

Little is known of her early life or family but in 1944 she was in Paris and had graduated in mathematics. Records from the Université de Poitiers show that she held a position at the École Normale for the 1944-1945 academic year.

== Career ==
After earning her bachelor's degree, she joined the institut Henri-Poincaré where she collaborated with a small group of researchers working on probability theory, a field of mathematical research which was somewhat neglected in France at the time.

In 1948, Mourier spent some time at the University of California, Berkeley, where Jerzy Neyman attracted French probabilists. Although Lucien Le Cam and Michel Loève remained there, Mourier soon returned to France.

Mourier became a researcher at Centre national de la recherche scientifique (French National Centre for Scientific Research) (CNRS) in 1945. At this time, she took part in an informal reading group on statistics with Lucien de Cam and Colette Rothschild.

In 1952, Mourier was appointed director of research at CNRS after defending her doctoral thesis on "Random elements in a Banach space" (French: Éléments aléatoires dans un espace de Banach). This work generalises the law of large numbers relating to random points to function spaces (Banach spaces), known as the Fortet–Mourier distance after Mourier and her PhD supervisor and colleague Robert Fortet. The Mourier theorem for the equality of the cylindrical and Borel σ-algebras on separable Banach spaces is also named after her.

After leaving CNRS, Mourier became a lecturer (maître de conférences) at the University of Poitiers from 1956 to 1967, then at the University of Paris from 1967 to 1987, where in particular she was active in the LPMA laboratory (Laboratoire de probabilités et modèles aléatoires), collaborating with Robert Fortet and the evolving Jacques Neveu.

She remained at the LPNA for the next 20 years, that is until the end of her career. She continued to maintain an interest in telecommunications, investigating signal detection in the presence of noise and also embarking on the definition of white noise.

== Research ==
Her name continues to be associated with the Fortet–Mourier distance, a metric used in probability theory to quantify the difference between two probability measures based an the evaluation of the gap between their bounded Lipschitz continuity functions. She was also an important contributor to developing a marriage between random variables and complete normed spaces. She produced an extension of the Glivenko–Cantelli theorem in 1953.

== Publications ==
- Éléments aléatoires dans un espace de Banach. Vol. 13. Paris: Gauthier-Villars. 1953. p. 161-244. OCLC 1157293879..
- Mourier, Edith (1976-03-01). "Influence d'une erreur sur la covariance dans le problème de la détection d'un signal certain dans un bruit laplacien centré". Annales des Télécommunications (in French). 31 (3): 108–110. Bibcode:1976AnTel..31..108M. doi:10.1007/BF02997592. ISSN 1958-9395..
- "Random elements in linear spaces". Berkeley Symp. On Math. Statist. And Prob. 5.2A: 43-53. 1967..
- Mourier, Édith (1964-07-01). "Le bruit blanc". Annales des Télécommunications (in French). 19 (7): 169–172. doi:10.1007/BF03021654. ISSN 1958-9395..

== Death and commemoration ==
Édith Mourier died age 96 on 19 December 2017 in the apartment on Rue Sarrette in the 14th arrondissement of Paris where she had lived for the previous 60 years.

In 2026, Édith Mourier was announced as one of 72 historical women in STEM whose names have been proposed to be added to the 72 men already celebrated on the Eiffel Tower. The plan was conceived by a student and tour guide named Bernard Rigaud and it was announced by the Mayor of Paris, Anne Hidalgo following the recommendations of a committee led by Isabelle Vauglin of Femmes et Sciences and Jean-François Martins, representing the operating company which runs the Eiffel Tower.
