= Arthur Morin =

French physicist

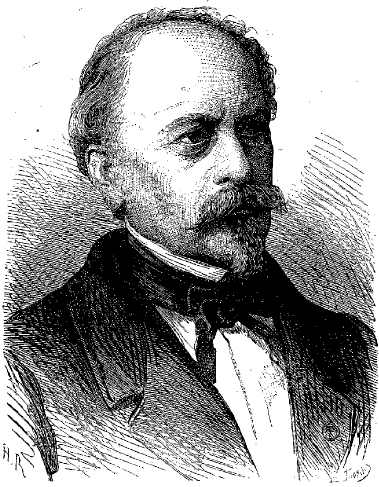
Arthur Morin

Arthur Jules Morin (19 October 1795 – 7 February 1880) was a French physicist. He conducted experiments in mechanics and invented the Morin dynamometer. He introduced the term coefficient of friction and demonstrated its utility.

In 1850, he was elected a foreign member of the Royal Swedish Academy of Sciences. His name is one of the 72 names inscribed on the Eiffel Tower. He was conferred with Honorary Membership of the Institution of Engineers and Shipbuilders in Scotland in 1859. He was named as one of the 23 "Men of Tribology" by Duncan Dowson.
