= List of names on the Eiffel Tower =

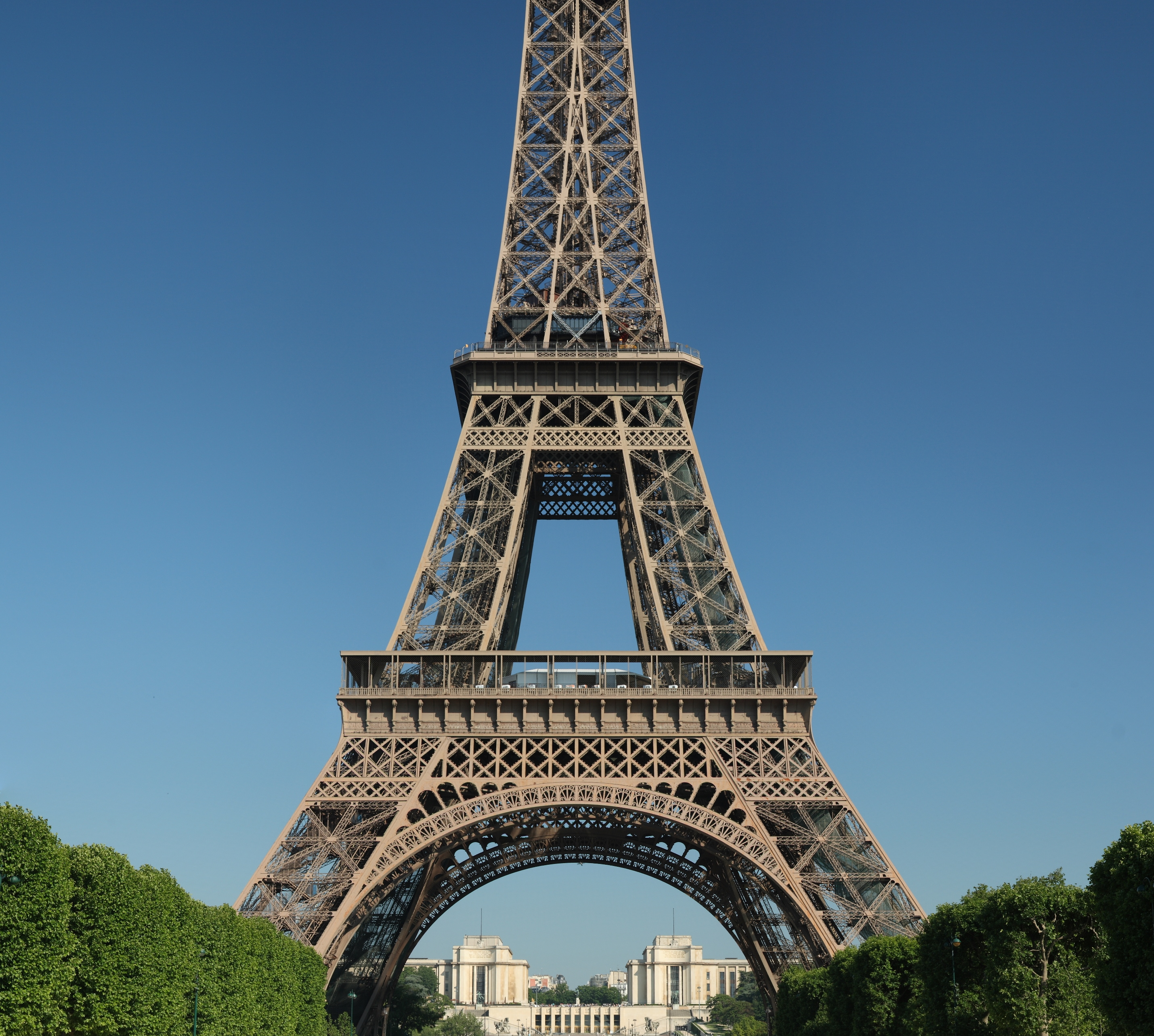
- The location of the names on the tower

On the Eiffel Tower, 72 names of French male scientists, engineers, and mathematicians appear in raised lettering in recognition of their contributions. Gustave Eiffel chose this "invocation of science" because of his concern over the protests against the tower, and chose names of those who had distinguished themselves since 1789. The engravings are found on the sides of the tower under the first balcony, in letters about 60 cm (24 in) tall, and were originally painted in gold. The engraving was painted over at the beginning of the 20th century and restored in 1986–87 by Société Nouvelle d'exploitation de la Tour Eiffel, the company that the city of Paris contracts to operate the Tower. The repainting of 2010–11 restored the letters to their original gold colour. There are also names of the engineers who helped build the Tower and design its architecture on a plaque on the top of the Tower, where a laboratory was built as well.

It has been proposed to add the names of 72 leading women to the tower and a list for agreement with the mayor of Paris was presented in 2026.

== List ==
=== Location ===
The list is split in four parts (one for each side of the tower). The sides have been named after the parts of Paris that each side faces:

- The North-East side (also known as La Bourdonnais side)
Petiet, Daguerre, Wurtz, Le Verrier, Perdonnet, Delambre, Malus, Breguet, Polonceau, Dumas, Clapeyron, Borda, Fourier, Bichat, Sauvage, Pelouze, Carnot, Lamé
- The South-East side (also known as the Military School side)
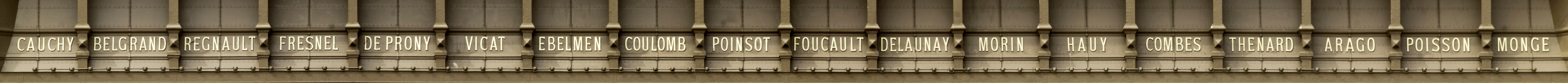
Cauchy, Belgrand, Regnault, Fresnel, De Prony, Vicat, Ebelmen, Coulomb, Poinsot, Foucault, Delaunay, Morin, Haüy, Combes, Thénard, Arago, Poisson, Monge
- The South-West side (also known as the Grenelle side)
Jamin, Gay-Lussac, Fizeau, Schneider, Le Chatelier, Berthier, Barral, De Dion, Goüin, Jousselin, Broca, Becquerel, Coriolis, Cail, Triger, Giffard, Perrier, Sturm
- The North West side (also known as the Trocadéro side)
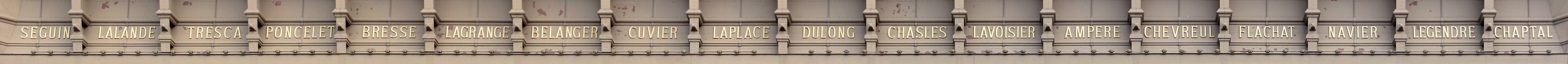
Seguin, Lalande, Tresca, Poncelet, Bresse, Lagrange, Belanger, Cuvier, Laplace, Dulong, Chasles, Lavoisier, Ampère, Chevreul, Flachat, Navier, Legendre, Chaptal

=== Names ===
In the table below are all the names on the four sides.

Name appearing	Full name	Occupation	Location	Portrait
SEGUIN	Marc Seguin	engineer	NW01	
LALANDE	Jérôme Lalande	astronomer	NW02	
TRESCA	Henri Tresca	engineer and mechanic	NW03	
PONCELET	Jean-Victor Poncelet	geometer	NW04	
BRESSE	Jacques Antoine Charles Bresse	civil engineer and hydraulic engineer	NW05	
LAGRANGE	Joseph-Louis Lagrange	mathematician	NW06	
BELANGER	Jean-Baptiste-Charles-Joseph Bélanger	mathematician and hydraulic engineer	NW07	
CUVIER	Georges Cuvier	naturalist	NW08	
LAPLACE	Pierre-Simon Laplace	mathematician and astronomer	NW09	
DULONG	Pierre Louis Dulong	physicist and chemist	NW10	
CHASLES	Michel Chasles	geometer	NW11	
LAVOISIER	Antoine Lavoisier	chemist	NW12	
AMPERE	André-Marie Ampère	mathematician and physicist	NW13	
CHEVREUL	Michel Eugène Chevreul	chemist	NW14	
FLACHAT	Eugène Flachat	civil engineer	NW15	
NAVIER	Claude-Louis Marie Henri Navier	mathematician	NW16	
LEGENDRE	Adrien-Marie Legendre	mathematician	NW17	
CHAPTAL	Jean-Antoine Chaptal	agronomist and chemist	NW18	
JAMIN	Jules Jamin	physicist	SW01	
GAY-LUSSAC	Joseph Louis Gay-Lussac	chemist	SW02	
FIZEAU	Hippolyte Fizeau	physicist	SW03	
SCHNEIDER	Eugène Schneider	industrialist	SW04	
LE CHATELIER	Louis Le Chatelier	engineer	SW05	
BERTHIER	Pierre Berthier	mineralogist	SW06	
BARRAL	Jean-Augustin Barral	agronomist, chemist, physicist	SW07	
DE DION	Henri de Dion (Note: not to be confused with Jules-Albert de Dion, automobile pioneer)	engineer	SW08	
GOUIN	Ernest Goüin	engineer and industrialist	SW09	
JOUSSELIN	Louis Didier Jousselin	engineer	SW10	
BROCA	Paul Broca	physician and anthropologist	SW11	
BECQUEREL	Antoine César Becquerel	physicist	SW12	
CORIOLIS	Gaspard-Gustave Coriolis	engineer and scientist	SW13	
CAIL	Jean-François Cail	industrialist	SW14	
TRIGER	Jacques Triger	engineer	SW15	
GIFFARD	Henri Giffard	engineer	SW16	
PERRIER	François Perrier	geographer and mathematician	SW17	
STURM	Jacques Charles François Sturm	mathematician	SW18	
CAUCHY	Augustin-Louis Cauchy	mathematician	SE01	
BELGRAND	Eugène Belgrand	engineer	SE02	
REGNAULT	Henri Victor Regnault	chemist and physicist	SE03	
FRESNEL	Augustin-Jean Fresnel	civil engineer and physicist	SE04	
DE PRONY	Gaspard de Prony	engineer	SE05	
VICAT	Louis Vicat	engineer	SE06	
EBELMEN	Jacques-Joseph Ebelmen	chemist	SE07	
COULOMB	Charles-Augustin de Coulomb	physicist	SE08	
POINSOT	Louis Poinsot	mathematician	SE09	
FOUCAULT	Léon Foucault	physicist	SE10	
DELAUNAY	Charles-Eugène Delaunay	astronomer	SE11	
MORIN	Arthur Morin	mathematician and physicist	SE12	
HAUY	René Just Haüy	mineralogist	SE13	
COMBES	Charles Combes	engineer and metallurgist	SE14	
THENARD	Louis Jacques Thénard	chemist	SE15	
ARAGO	François Arago	astronomer and physicist	SE16	
POISSON	Siméon Denis Poisson	mathematician and physicist	SE17	
MONGE	Gaspard Monge	geometer	SE18	
PETIET	Jules Petiet	engineer	NE01	
DAGUERRE	Louis Daguerre	artist and chemist	NE02	
WURTZ	Charles-Adolphe Wurtz	chemist	NE03	
LE VERRIER	Urbain Le Verrier	astronomer	NE04	
PERDONNET	Albert Auguste Perdonnet	engineer	NE05	
DELAMBRE	Jean Baptiste Joseph Delambre	astronomer	NE06	
MALUS	Étienne-Louis Malus	physicist	NE07	
BREGUET	Louis Breguet	physicist and inventor	NE08	
POLONCEAU	Camille Polonceau	engineer	NE09	
DUMAS	Jean-Baptiste Dumas	chemist	NE10	
CLAPEYRON	Émile Clapeyron	engineer and physicist	NE11	
BORDA	Jean-Charles de Borda	mathematician	NE12	
FOURIER	Joseph Fourier	mathematician	NE13	
BICHAT	Marie François Xavier Bichat	anatomist and physiologist	NE14	
SAUVAGE	François Clément Sauvage	engineer and geologist	NE15	
PELOUZE	Théophile-Jules Pelouze	chemist	NE16	
CARNOT	Lazare Carnot (Note: not to be confused with Nicolas Léonard Sadi Carnot, his son)	mathematician	NE17	
LAME	Gabriel Lamé	mathematician	NE18	

== Criticism ==
=== Women ===
The list contains no women. The list has been particularly criticized for excluding the name of Sophie Germain, a noted French mathematician whose work on the theory of elasticity was used in the construction of the tower itself. In 1913, John Augustine Zahm suggested that Germain was excluded because she was a woman.

An Eiffel Tower tour guide, Benjamin Rigaud, would point out to visitors the 72 names of scientists on the tower, but he was surprised to find that there were no women included. He noticed that there were 40 spaces on the tower's second floor and this matched the number of women identified in a Femmes et Sciences document. This led to the idea of a project, to include the missing women, which was named after Hypatia, the fourth century CE Alexandrian mathematician. The idea was taken up by Nathalie Drach-Temam, President of Sorbonne University.

It was decided that only those women scientists who had an association with France should be considered. Rigaud was keen to see scientists who had lived and worked in France included, such as Japanese physicist Toshiko Yuasa, Senegalese-born computer scientist Rose Dieng-Kuntz, and Tunisian-born engineer Radhia Cousot.

In 2025, Paris mayor Anne Hidalgo named a commission of experts to consider the project. The commission's report was positive and advocated inscribing the names of 72 female scientists adjacent to those of the 72 male scientists, to reflect full equality. The Association Femmes & Sciences was tasked with preparing a list of women scientists to be commemorated. In January 2026, the Association unveiled a proposed list of late 72 women scientists from 1789 to the present. In 2026, the list was awaiting acceptance by the mayor, the Académie des Sciences, the Académie des Technologies and the Académie nationale de médecine.

The suggested women are Denise Albe-Fessard, Yvette Amice, Jeanne Baret, Denise Barthomeuf, Madeleine Brès, Yvonne Choquet-Bruhat, Simonne Caillère, Yvette Cauchois, Edmée Chandon, Marthe Condat, Anita Conti, Eugénie Cotton, Radhia Cousot, Odile Croissant, Marie Curie, Augusta Dejerine-Klumpke, Henriette Delamarre, Georgette Délibrias, Nathalie Demassieux, Rose Dieng, Angélique du Coudray, Louise du Pierry, Henriette Mathieu-Faraggi, Jacqueline Ferrand, Jacqueline Ficini, Rosalind Franklin, Marthe Gautier, Sophie Germain, Jeanne Guiot, Geneviève Guitel, Sébastienne Guyot, Claudine Hermann, Andrée Hoppilliard, Marie-Louise Dubreil-Jacotin, Irène Joliot-Curie, Geneviève Jourdain, Dorothéa Klumpke, Lydie Koch-Miramond, Colette Kreder, Nicole Laroche, Cornélie Lebon-de Brambilla, Yolande Le Calvez, Paulette Libermann, Marianne Grunberg-Manago, Nicole Mangin, Cécile Morette, Édith Mourier, Ethel Moustacchi, Suzanne Noël, Yvonne Odic, Isabelle Olivieri, Marie-Louise Paris, Marguerite Perey, Claudine Picardet, Alberte Pullman, Pauline Ramart, Lucie Randoin, Alice Recoque, Michelle Schatzman, Anne-Marcelle Schrameck, Marie-Hélène Schwartz, Josiane Serre, Alice Sollier, Hélène Sparrow, Bianca Tchoubar, Marie-Antoinette Tonnelat, Thérèse Tréfouël, Agnès Ullmann, Arlette Vassy, Suzanne Veil, Jeanne Villepreux and Toshiko Yuasa.

The names were chosen based on a number of criteria. They had to have lived after 1789, which excluded the leading chemists Marie Meurdrac and Émilie du Châtelet. They could not have a name that was already on the tower, so this excluded Marie-Anne Paulze Lavoisier, whose first husband Antoine Lavoisier's name is one of the original men of science. Additionally, their name could not be too long, like Marie Geneviève Charlotte Thiroux d’Arconville. Rosalind Franklin was allowed exceptionally because of her association with France as the criteria had been that they should all be French.

=== Hydraulic engineers and scholars ===
Eiffel acknowledged most of the leading French scientists in the field of hydraulic engineering; fourteen of them are listed on the Eiffel Tower. Among those missing are Henri Philibert Gaspard Darcy, whose work did not come into wide use until the 20th century, Antoine Chézy, and Joseph Valentin Boussinesq, who was early in his career at the time. The renowned mathematician Évariste Galois is also absent from the list, as are Joseph Liouville and Charles Hermite, two other famous French mathematicians.

== See also ==
- List of women's names for the Eiffel Tower
