= Jacques Antoine Charles Bresse =

French civil engineer (1822–1883)

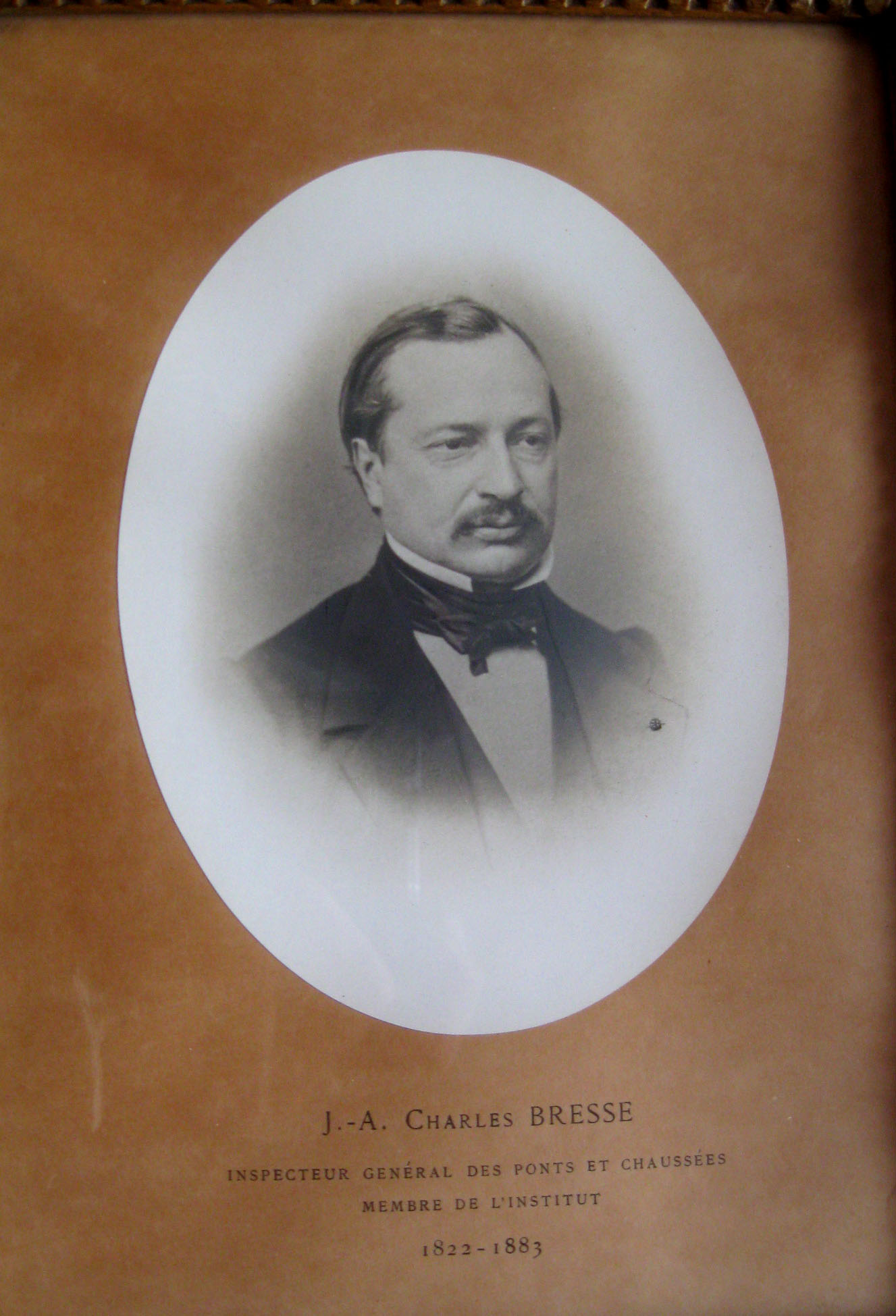
Bresse

Jacques Antoine Charles Bresse (9 October 1822, in Vienne, Isère – 22 May 1883) was a French civil engineer who specialized in the design and use of hydraulic motors.

Bresse graduated from the École Polytechnique in 1843 and received his formal education in engineering at the École des Ponts et Chaussées. He returned to the École des Ponts et Chaussées in 1848 as an instructor for applied mechanics courses and in 1853 gained his professorship in applied mechanics, after which he taught at the school until his death in 1883.

His name is one of the 72 names inscribed on the Eiffel Tower.

== Biography ==
Originally, the Bresse family were peasants from the province of Bresse who came to settle in a small village, Artas, Isère department, around 1500. The village lies between Vienne and Grenoble, between Bourgoin and Saint-Jean-de-Bournay. Initially a peasant family, Artas became a landowner. Its members became notaries and mayors of the commune.

Jacques Antoine Charles Bresse's father, Innocent François Candide, was born on 9 March 1791, in Artas. He moved to Vienne, Isère south of Lyon. He was a wool merchant.

Jacques Antoine Charles Bresse was born on 9 October 1822 in Vienne, Isère.

Bresse's mother died in 1825, when he was just 3 years old. His father entrusted him to his sister, Jeanne Marie Unité, who had just married and lived in Artas, the birthplace of the Bresse family. He was raised as a Patois.At the age of 7, he spoke only Dauphinois. We used to say to him: “Ba, mije, te case” (Drink, eat and shut up), in Dauphinois, which remained famous in the family.

At the age of 8, he was placed as a day pupil at the collège in Bourgoin (13 km), where he travelled every day by cart. At the age of 15, he became a boarder at the Lycée du Parc, then at the Lycée Saint-Louis in Paris. At 19, he was one of the first to enter the École polytechnique in 1841.

Bresse graduated from the École polytechnique in 1843, then entered the École des ponts ParisTech. On graduating, he was appointed ingénieur des ponts et chaussées and spent several years in the Lot-et-Garonne and Isère departments.

He came to prominence in 1848, at the age of 25, when he published an article in the Annales des ponts et chaussées: Études théoriques sur la résistance des arcs employés dans les ponts en fonte ou en bois. He was immediately attached as a tutor to Jean-Baptiste Bélanger applied mechanics course at the École des ponts et chaussées. In 1851, he was attached to the École Polytechnique as a tutor.

In 1853, he succeeded Bélanger as Professor of Applied Mechanics at the École des ponts ParisTech, and Professor of Mechanics and Machines at the École polytechnique. In 1855, he completely revised his studies on the strength of curved parts.

In 1874, he received the Académie's Poncelet Prize, and in 1880 was elected to the French Academy of Sciences, Mechanics section. The fact that Bresse was elected to the Académie des Sciences was hardly due to his outstanding research, but rather to his collegiality and his entry into French engineering associations.

Of particular importance are works on Strength of materials and structural stability, on the one hand, and on hydraulics, on the other.

He was made an Officer of the Legion of Honour in July 1880.

He was Inspector General of Ponts et Chaussées. In this capacity, he chaired the jury that authorized Gustave Eiffel to build the Garabit viaduct. He considered that Gustave Eiffel should take all the financial risks.

On 8 May 1883, he went to bed suffering from Erysipelas (an inflammatory skin infection). He died on 22 May 1883, aged 60.

Numerous scholarly speeches were made at his tomb, including those by M. Tarbé de Saint-Hardouin, Director of the École des ponts et chaussées, M. Mercadier, Director of the École polytechnique, and M. Phillips, member of the Institut. They all emphasized the man's moral qualities, which matched his value as a scientist. All those who came into contact with him knew of his simplicity, his uprightness and his scrupulous conscientiousness in the performance of his duties.

== Publications ==
- Bresse, Jacques Antoine Charles, Water-wheels; Or, Hydraulic Motors, John Wiley & Sons, New York 1869.
