= Lucie Randoin =

French biologist (1888–1960)

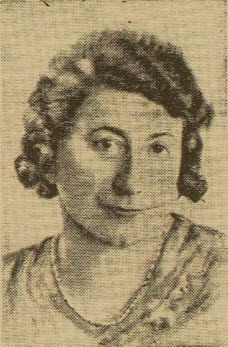
- Born: Lucie Fandard; 11 May 1888; Yonne, France
- Died: 13 September 1960 (aged 72)
- Education: École Normale Supérieure, University of Clermont-Ferrand, University of Paris (PhD)
- Honours: Commander of the Legion of Honour (1958)
- Scientific career
- Fields: Biology; Nutrition; Hygiene
- Institutions: Institut national de la recherche agronomique
- Thesis: Sucre libre et sucre protéidique du sang (1918)

Signature
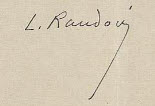

Lucie Gabrielle Randoin, née Fandard, (11 May 1888 – 13 September 1960) was a French biologist, nutritionist and hygienist at a time when it was unusual for women to excel in the emerging discipline of nutrition. A pioneer in her sphere, she is remembered for her outstanding contribution to institutional research into the identification and dietary significance of vitamins. She was made a commander of the Legion of Honour in 1958.

In 2026 she was named as one of the 72 women to have their names engraved on the Eiffel Tower.

== Early life and education ==
Lucie Randoin was born Lucie Fandard on 11 May 11 1888, in Bouers-en-Othe, Yonne. Her parents Arthur Fandard and Estelle Gauvin both worked in a bookshop in Passy. As a result of their early death, Lucie was forced to earn a living while continuing her studies. She attended the École Normale Supérieure in Paris and went on to study at the University of Clermont-Ferrand and the University of Paris, where she received her Ph.D. in 1918 with a thesis titled "Free sugar and protein-bound sugar in the blood" (French: Sucre libre et sucre protéidique du sang). In 1909, she was placed second in the competitive agrégation examination in natural science, becoming only the second women to receive the distinction.

In July 1914, immediately before the First World War, she married the geologist Arthur Randoin, one of her colleagues at the École normale whom she had met at the Sorbonne. Shortly thereafter, he was sent to the front where he remained until 1918, returning with pulmonary insufficiency.

== Career ==
In the last year of her doctoral studies, Randoin joined physiologist Albert Dastre as his research assistant in the science faculty at the University of Paris. After receiving her doctorate, she went on to become a researcher at the Oceanographic Institute of Paris in 1919, investigating nutritive vitamins. In 1922, at a time when it was unusual for women to excel in nutrition, she moved to the Société scientifique d'hygiène alimentaire (Scientific Society for Food Hygiene), becoming assistant director of the chemistry and physiology laboratory. Throughout the 1920s, she published a considerable number of papers on vitamins, laying the foundations for the applied science of nutrition. In particular, she published the results of her investigations into what were then termed the "antiscorbutic factor" (now known as C vitamins C) and the "water-soluble B factor" (now B vitamins). These findings led to the identification of the corresponding vitamins and resulted in Randoin being called the "muse des vitamines" (vitamin muse). In parallel,from 1922 to 1953, she was director of the physiological laboratory at the French Institut national de la recherche agronomique (National Institute of Agricultural Research) and also became director of the École pratique des hautes études, from November 1930.

In the late 1920s and the 1930s, Randoin gained wide recognition and was invited to numerous scientific conferences in the United States, the United Kingdom, Italy, Spain and Belgium.

Randoin was also the director of the Institut Supérieur de l'Alimentation (Institute of Nutritional Science) from 1942 to 1960, and the director of the École Dietétique in 1951.

Randoin spent her research career studying the role of vitamins in metabolism and their composition. She discovered that vitamins B and C can affect sugar metabolism, which led to research on the connection between alcoholism and malnutrition. At the 1956 Paris Congress, she reported that If a diet very rich in carbohydrates (starches and sugars) is deficient in B vitamins, the carbohydrates are unable to fully release the energy they hold in potential form, and digestive and nervous disorders ensue.

During World War II, Randoin supported the French Resistance by hiding vaccines and serums for their use.

== Honours and awards ==
Randoin was awarded the Natural Sciences fellowship in 1911, becoming one of the first women to receive it. She was admitted into the Académie nationale de médecine in 1946 and was a 1958 recipient of the Legion of Honour.

In 2025 La Poste issued a stamp honouring her.

In 2026, Randoin was announced as one of 72 historical women in STEM whose names were proposed to be added to the 72 men already celebrated on the Eiffel Tower. The plan was conceived by a student and tour guide named Bernard Rigaud and it was announced by the Mayor of Paris, Anne Hidalgo following the recommendations of a committee led by Isabelle Vauglin of Femmes et Sciences and Jean-François Martins, representing the operating company which runs the Eiffel Tower.
