= Yvonne Odic =

French mechanical engineer (1890–1983)

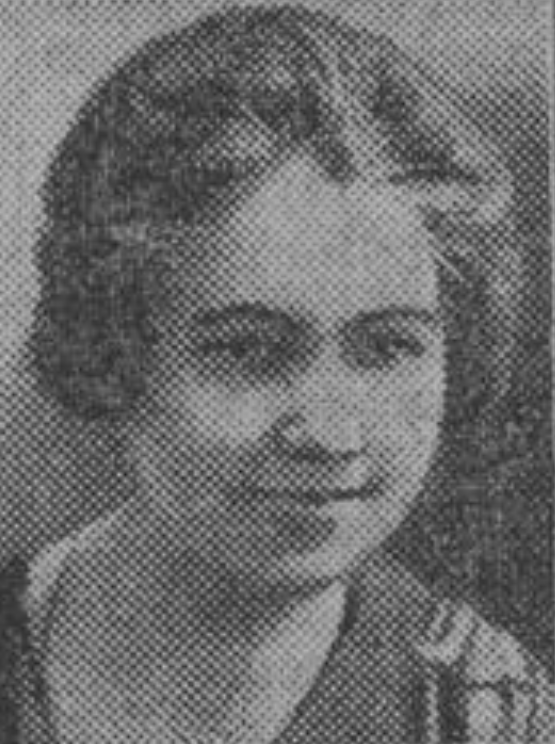
- Born: Yvonne Justine Jeanne Charlotte Odic; 6 July 1890; Harfleur, Normandy, France
- Died: January 20, 1983 (aged 92); Saint-Tropez, France
- Education: University of Nancy
- Occupation: Mechanical engineer

Yvonne Odic (6 July 1890 - 20 January 1983) was a French mechanical engineer. She is remembered for developing special steels in a Paris factory during the First World War at a time when it was unusual for women to work as engineers in industry.

In early 2026, Odic was confirmed to be one of the 72 women to have their names added to those of the men already engraved on the Eiffel Tower.

== Early life and education ==
Yvonne Justine Jeanne Charlotte Odic was born on 6 July 1890 in Harfleur, Normandy. She was one of five siblings and her father worked as a tax collector. Her sister Renée Odic-Bellot became an occular surgeon and another sister became a chemical engineer. In 1906 she won a national merit boarding school scholarship of 400 francs. Keen on mathematics from an early age, she studied the subject at the Institute of Electronics and Mechanics at the University of Nancy.

Alongside her university studies, she helped install X-ray equipment at the Bon-Pasteur Hospital and worked for the city of Nancy's meteorological service.

Odic earned her degree in mechanical engineering followed by a degree in aerodynamics at the Nancy Electrotechnical Institute, founded in 1900 (now the Nancy National School of Electricity and Mechanics, or ENSEM).

== Career ==
Odic was working for Citroen at the start of World War One. She went on to develop special steels in one of the largest armament factories (usines de guerre) in Paris. In 1917, her employment as an engineer at a French shipbuilding company was reported in the British press.

In France, the end of the war in 1917–1918 marked a turning point. Newspapers of the time described Yvonne Odic as the first female engineer, who had just earned her engineering degree from the Institut Electro-Technique de Nancy, a dynamic institute founded in 1900.

She was concerned about the conditions of those working in factories, and offered them lessons in mathematics and rhythmic gymnastics.

Odic was a member of the constituent assembly of the National Union of French Mechanical Engineers following her marriage. In 1930, she was working for Breguet engines in Lille.

== Personal life ==
Odic later married Gabriel Jouanaud on 10 December 1918. Yvonne Odic died on 20 January 1983 in Saint-Tropez.

== Recognition ==
In 2026, Odic was announced as one of 72 historical women in STEM whose names have been proposed to be added to the 72 men already celebrated on the Eiffel Tower. The plan was announced by the Mayor of Paris, Anne Hidalgo, following the recommendations of a committee led by Isabelle Vauglin of Femmes et Sciences and Jean-François Martins, representing the operating company which runs the Eiffel Tower.
