= Jeanne Guiot =

French engineer and metallurgist (1889–1963)

- Born: 24 March 1889; Caen, France
- Died: 11 July 1963 (aged 74); Avignon, France
- Known for: First woman admitted into the Société des ingénieurs civils de France
- Engineering career
- Discipline: Metallurgy

Jeanne Guiot (French: [ʒan ɡjo]; 24 March 1889 – 11 July 1963) was a French engineer specialising in metallurgy. She worked on the development of special steels for the French navy and carried out research in the areas of energy, thermodynamics and blast furnaces. Guiot was committed to promoting women's access to scientific and civic positions of responsibility. In 1922, she was the first woman to be admitted to the French civil engineers' society, Société des ingénieurs civils de France. Her name was one of 72 women of science proposed for addition to the Eiffel Tower in 2026.

== Early life and education ==
Jeanne Marie Guiot was born on 24 March 1889 in Caen, Normandy to Marie Adeline Augustine Hetzlen and Gustave Henri Marie Eulalie Louis Joseph Guiot. Her father was a medical doctor and her paternal grandfather was a lighthouse engineer.

She studied sciences at the University of Caen in Normandy and was researching her PhD thesis before the outbreak of World War I. Women's access to higher education in France was still limited in the early 20th century.

== Career ==
At the start of World War I, Guiot enlisted as a volunteer nurse, interrupting her doctoral thesis in science, but fell seriously ill herself. During her convalescence, she undertook some work for an engineer, which opened up an opportunity for her.

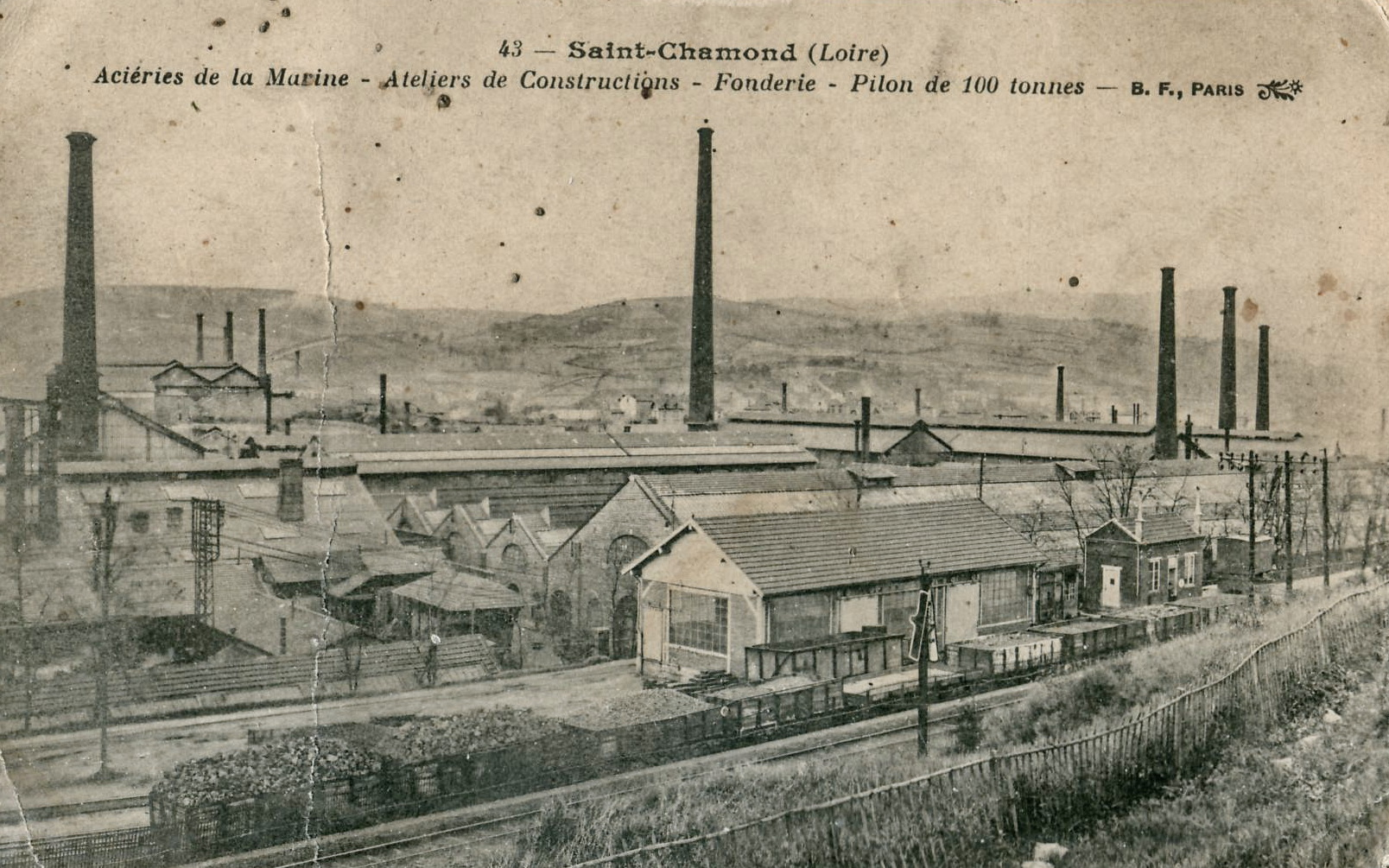
The French Navy's steelworks where Guiot worked

In 1917, Guiot joined the Compagnie des forges et aciéries de la marine et d'Homécourt (the French Navy's steelworks) as an engineer. The organisation supplied locomotives for heavy artillery and special steels for the Navy. She worked on cutting-edge research in energy, thermodynamics and blast furnaces.

In 1917, she founded a group of agricultural volunteers in Paris, an initiative designed to compensate for the male labourers being called up into the armed forces. The group was made up of around sixty people, who jointly cultivated a 1.5-hectare plot of land in the grounds of Princess Mathilde's château in Saint-Gratien, north-west of Paris, with the harvests donated to feed those in need. She was the President of the group in 1918 and she recommended her group's work to the French Academy of Agriculture.

In 1922, she became the first woman to be admitted to the Société des ingénieurs civils de France (French Society of Civil Engineers) after first applying to join in 1917. The relevant committee had their first application from a woman in 1916, but they refused to put it on the agenda. The committee who debated her application were trying to decide if women could be engineers as men were in short supply. Women engineers were thought to be intellectually inferior, but it was suspected that one of the reasons might be that they were underfed. Throughout her life, she fought for women's rights, including women's access to meaningful positions in the sciences.

== Personal life ==
Jeanne Guiot died in Avignon on 11 July 1963 aged 74.

== Legacy ==
In 2026, Guiot was announced as one of 72 historical women in STEM whose names have been proposed to be added to the 72 men already celebrated on the Eiffel Tower. The plan was announced by the Mayor of Paris, Anne Hidalgo following the recommendations of a committee led by Isabelle Vauglin of Femmes et Sciences and Jean-François Martins, representing the operating company which runs the Eiffel Tower.

In their report proposing Guiot's inclusion among the 72 names for the Eiffel Tower, Femmes & Sciences commented: "Elle est une pionnière, à la croisée de l’ingénierie et de l’action sociale" (She was a pioneer at the intersection of engineering and social work).

== See also ==
- History of women in engineering
