= Geneviève Jourdain =

French engineer and researcher (1945–2006)

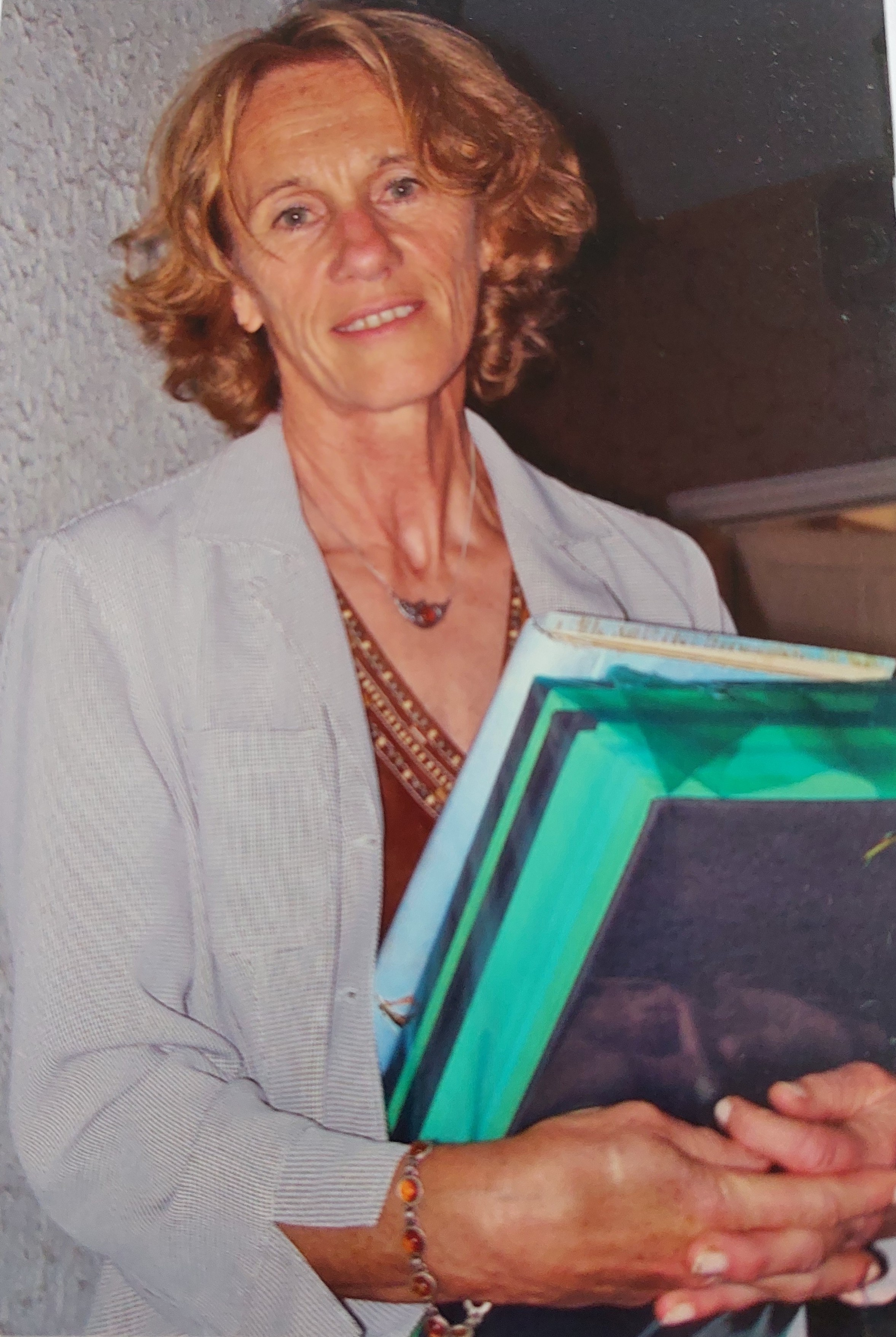
- Born: March 31, 1945; Entre-deux-Guiers
- Died: October 19, 2006 (aged 61); La Tronche
- Education: Grenoble Institute of Technology
- Known for: Development of signal processing

Geneviève Jourdain, also known as Geneviève Jourdain Garampon, (31 March 1945 – 19 October 2006) was a French engineer, professor and researcher who played a prominent role in the development of signal processing. She was particularly active in the field of underwater acoustics and, from 1970 onwards, taught information theory, signal processing and telecommunications.

In 2026 she was named as one of the 72 women to have their names engraved on the Eiffel Tower.

== Early life and education ==
Geneviève Jourdain was born on 31 March 1945 in Entre-deux-Guiers in south-eastern France. She graduated as an engineer in 1966 from the Grenoble Institute of Technology (Institut National Polytechnique de Grenoble or INP) – then known as ENSERG. She went on to receive her first doctorate in 1979, followed by a state doctorate in 1976 with a dissertation on "la caractérisation des ondes propagées dans un milieu fluctuant" (characterization of waves propagating in a fluctuating medium).

== Career ==
Jourdain is remembered both for her qualities as a teacher and for the many contributions made as a researcher,

In 1973, Jourdain began her teaching career at the INP, Grenoble, where she rose through the grades until she was ultimately appointed professor. She created courses covering new areas of interest and supervised many doctorate theses. Her teaching covered various schools and departments at the INP, including the ENSIEG (energy and information processing), the ENSPG (physics and nuclear engineering) and the EEATS, where she supervised engineering and doctorate theses in the areas of electronics and signal processing.

Jourdain was a pioneering specialist in signal processing and telecommunications which have since become essential components of modern technologies. Her 1970 engineering doctoral thesis on "la conception des signaux" (signal design), in which she made original use of random signals, made a significant contribution to the recognition of the discipline of signal processing. As a result, she became a respected researcher in an area which until then had been primarily handled by men.

Her innovations continued in her 1976 scientific doctoral thesis Random and non-stationary linear filters: models, simulations and applications at the Grenoble Institute of Technology. Her wider work investigated integrating non-stationary data into the modelling of underwater acoustics. Her development of signal processing as a significant new area of interest led to her recognition both at the national and international levels.

From 1989, she headed the research laboratories in Grenoble, including the CEPAG (Centre d¨Études des Phénonèmes Aléatoires et Géographies), now known as the GIPSA-lab. Under her guidance, her teams developed innovative signal processing technologies based on the principal experimental and theoretical approaches of the times.

At the international level, Jourdain spoke at many high level congresses in her areas of interest. She also contributed to work on anti-submarine warfare, both in connection with NATO and with the European Union.

Jourdain died on 19 October 2006, aged 61, in La Tronche, in the department of Isère.

== Publications ==
- Jourdain, Geneviève (1977-01-01). "Synthèse de signaux certains dont on connait la fonction d'ambiguïté de type Woodward ou de type en compression". Annales des Télécommunications (in French). 32 (1): 19–23. Bibcode:1977AnTel..32...19J. doi:10.1007/BF02999820. ISSN 1958-9395.
- with G. Ginolhac, G.; Jourdain (2002). "Principal component inverse algorithm for detection in the presence of reverberation". IEEE Journal of Oceanic Engineering. 27 (2): 310–321. doi:10.1109/JOE.2002.1002486. ISSN 0364-9059.

== Awards and recognition ==
In 1999, Jourdain was appointed Chevalier de l'ordre national du Mérite.

In 2007, the journal Traitement du Signal: Signal, Image, Parole dedicated a special issue to her.

In 2016, a CROUS student residence on the Presqu'île de Grenoble science campus was opened, named for Geneviève Jourdain.

In 2026, Jourdain was announced as one of 72 historical women in STEM whose names were proposed to be added to the 72 men already celebrated on the Eiffel Tower. The plan was conceived by a student and tour guide named Bernard Rigaud and the list was announced by the Mayor of Paris, Anne Hidalgo following the recommendations of a committee led by Isabelle Vauglin of Femmes et Sciences and Jean-François Martins, representing the operating company which runs the Eiffel Tower.
