= Albert Auguste Perdonnet =

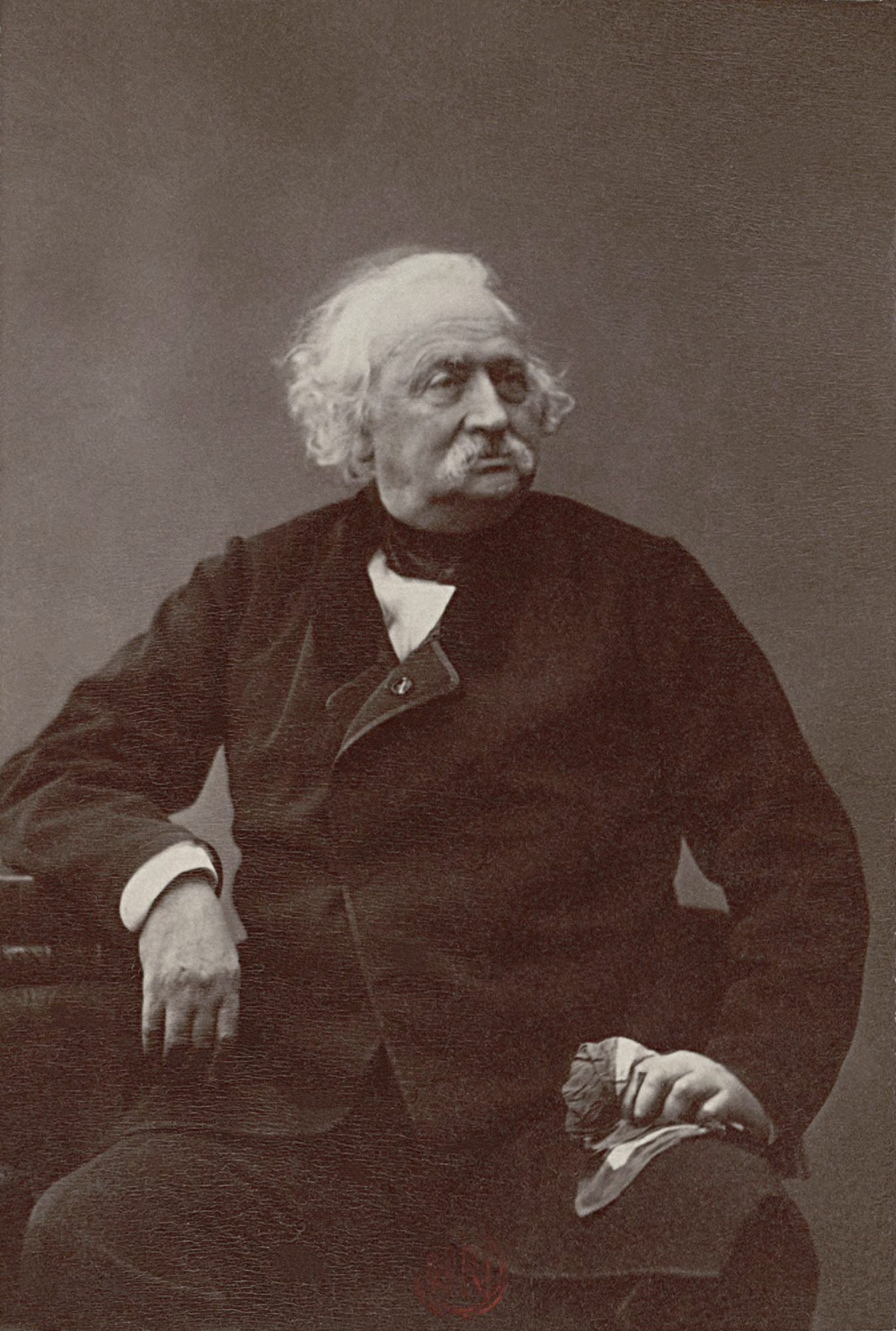
Albert Auguste Perdonnet

Jean Albert Vincent Auguste Perdonnet (French: [albɛʁ oɡyst pɛʁdɔnɛ]; 12 March 1801, Paris – 27 September 1867, Cannes) was a French railroad engineer. He published the first French textbook on railroad engineering in 1828. He also worked to investigate and remove the causes of railroad accidents.

Perdonnet's name is one of the 72 names on the Eiffel Tower.
