= Jean-Baptiste Bélanger =

French mathematician

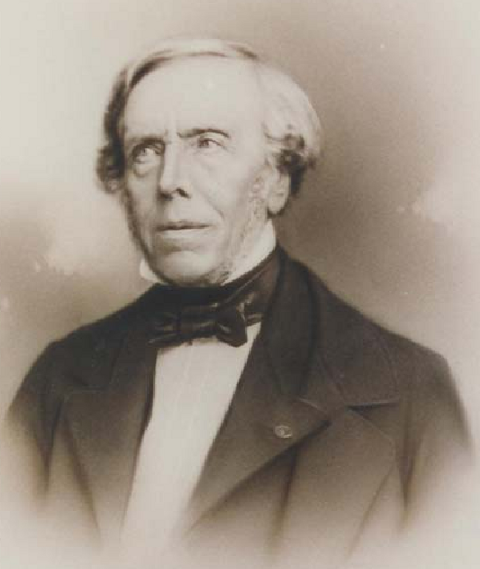
- Born: Jean-Baptiste Charles Joseph Bélanger; April 4, 1790; Valenciennes, Kingdom of France
- Died: May 8, 1874 (aged 84); Neuilly-sur-Seine, French Republic
- Education: École des Ponts et Chaussées
- Known for: Open channel hydraulics
- Parents: Charles Antoine Aimé Joseph Bélanger (father); Jeanne Françoise Joseph (mother)
- Scientific career
- Fields: Hydraulics
- Workplaces: École Polytechnique
- Notable students: Gustave Eiffel

Jean-Baptiste Charles Joseph Bélanger (4 April 1790 – 8 May 1874) was a French applied mathematician who worked in the areas of hydraulics and hydrodynamics. He was a professor at the École Centrale des Arts et Manufactures, École Polytechnique and École des Ponts et Chaussées in France. In hydraulic engineering, he is often credited improperly for the application of the momentum principle to a hydraulic jump in a rectangular open channel in 1828. His true contribution in 1828 was the development of the backwater equation for gradually varied flows in open channels and the application of the momentum principle to the hydraulic jump flow in 1838.

== Life of Bélanger ==
Born in Valenciennes on 4 April 1790, Bélanger was the son of Charles Antoine Aimé Joseph Bélanger, master locksmith, and of Jeanne Françoise Joseph. He studied in Paris at the École Polytechnique and later at the École des Ponts et Chaussées.

As Ingénieur du Corps des Ponts et Chaussées, he started his engineering career in 1816 at La Réole. From 1821, he moved to work on the Somme navigation canal and after 1826 on the Ardennes navigation canal. It was during these two missions that he studied specifically the hydraulics of gradually varied open channel flows. He later became a lecturer at the École Centrale des Arts et Manufactures between 1838 and 1864, at the École des Ponts et Chaussées from 1841 to 1855, and at the École Polytechnique from 1851 to 1860. At the École Centrale, one of his students was Gustave Eiffel (1832–1923) who built the Eiffel tower and engraved Bélanger's name around the first floor together with the names of 71 other scientists.

Jean-Baptiste Bélanger retired in 1864 and died on 8 May 1874 at Neuilly-sur-Seine where his body was buried.

== Contribution to open channel hydraulics ==
During his professional career, his 1828 treatise was a major contribution to modern open channel hydraulics. The work was focused on the study of gradually varied open channel flows. The originality of Bélanger 1828 essay was the successful development of the backwater equation for steady, one-dimensional gradually varied flows in an open channel, together with the introduction of the step method, distance calculated from depth, and the concept of critical flow conditions. In 1828, Bélanger understood the rapidly varied nature of the jump flow, but he applied incorrectly the Bernoulli principle to the hydraulic jump.

The correct application of momentum considerations to the hydraulic jump flow was derived 10 years later and first published by him in 1841 as part of a series of lecture notes for the École nationale des ponts et chaussées. His notes formed a comprehensive treatise in hydraulic engineering. They were re-edited several times and used at the École des Ponts et Chaussées and École Centrale des Arts et Manufactures, and available at the École Polytechnique et École des Mines de Paris.

Altogether Bélanger's 1828, and 1841 contributions to modern open channel hydraulics were remarkable and influenced the works by Jacques Antoine Charles Bresse, Henry Darcy, Henry Émile Bazin, Adhémar Jean Claude Barré de Saint-Venant, and Joseph Valentin Boussinesq, as well as Philipp Forchheimer and Boris Bakhmeteff.

== Contribution to applied mechanics ==
From 1851, as a full professor at the École Polytechnique, he developed a new university curriculum in mechanics (cours de Mécanique) in response to a re-structure of the engineering programme at École Polytechnique. Linking kinematics and dynamics, he argued that the mechanics is based upon three principles: inertia, action-reaction and constant ratio force to acceleration at any point. Among the innovations, he considered statics as a limited case of dynamics which was most innovative in France at the time. His basic ideas were first developed in his 1847 lecture notes, and they influenced many leading scholars in France and overseas. For example, Franz Reuleaux (1829–1905) respected highly Bélanger 1847 text; Ernst Mach (1838–1916) listed Bélanger's 1847 treatise among a few basic references in Mechanics.

An unusual aspect of Bélanger’s career was his most successful involvement in both professional engineering (1816–1838) and academic teaching (1838–1864), as well as his capabilities to develop fundamental new textbooks, widely respected in France and overseas (Chanson 2010).

== Published works ==
- Essai sur la Solution Numérique de quelques Problèmes Relatifs au Mouvement Permanent des Eaux Courantes [Essay on the Numerical Solution of Some Problems relative to Steady Flow of Water] (in French). Paris: Carilian-Goeury. 1828.
- Notes sur l'Hydraulique [Notes on Hydraulic Engineering] (in French). Paris: École Royale des Ponts et Chaussées. 1841. Session 1841-1842, 223 pages.
- Cours de Mécanique ou Résumé de Leçons sur la Dynamique, la Statique et leurs Applications à l'Art de l'Ingénieur [A Course in Mechanics or a Summary of Lessons on Dynamics and Statics and their Application to the Art of the Engineer] (in French). Paris: Carilian Goeury et V. Dalmont. 1847.
