= Henri de Dion =

French engineer (1828-1878)

Earl Henri de Dion (French: [ɑ̃ʁi də djɔ̃]; born near Montfort-l'Amaury on 23 December 1828, died in Paris on 13 April 1878) was a French engineer who contributed to the construction of the Eiffel Tower. He was an alumnus of the École Centrale Paris and specialised in metallic constructions, such as those of the Exposition Universelle (1878).

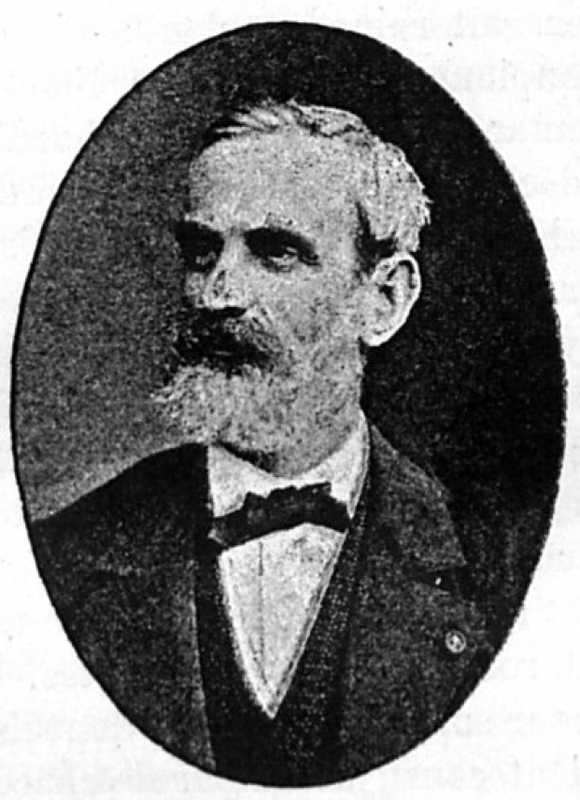
Henri de Dion

His work helped in the construction of the Eiffel Tower. For his contributions to its construction, de Dion was honored by being listed as one of the 72 names on the Eiffel Tower.
