= Denise Albe-Fessard =

French neuroscientist (1916–2003)

- Born: Denise Gabrielle Henriette Marie Albe; 31 May 1916; Paris, France
- Died: 7 May 2003 (aged 86)
- Education: ESPCI Paris (Dipl. Ing., 1937); University of Paris (PhD, 1950)
- Known for: Electrophysiology, Neurophysiology
- Spouse: Alfred Fessard (m. 1942; died 1982)
- Children: Jean Fessard
- Awards: Knight of the Legion of Honour (1973); Officer of the Ordre national du Mérite (1978)
- Scientific career
- Thesis: Recherches électrophysiologiques sur la décharge du gymnote, de la torpille, de la Raie. Etude des facteurs centraux et périphériques de son organisation (1950)

Signature
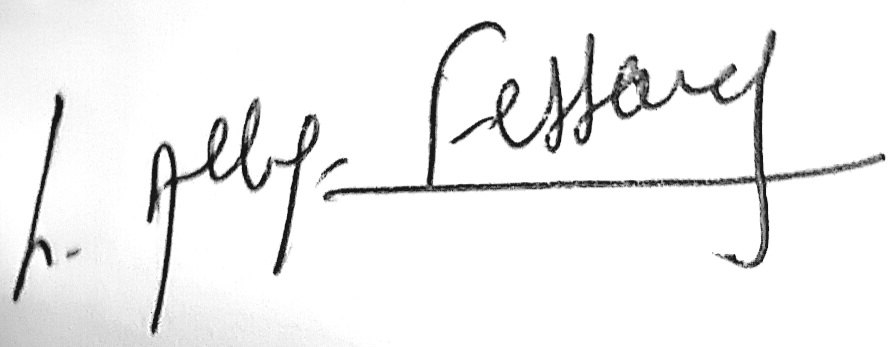

Denise Albe-Fessard (French pronunciation: [dəniz albəfesaʁ]; 31 May 1916 – 7 May 2003), née Denise Gabrielle Henriette Marie Albe, was a French neuroscientist best known for her basic research into the central nervous system pain pathways, clarifying the distinction between lateral and medial thalamic pain processing. She was named a Chevalier (Knight) of the Legion of Honour and an Officer of the Order of Merit.

== Early life and education ==
Denise Albe-Fessard was born in Boulogne-Billancourt, France, during the First World War to parents with backgrounds in farming and cratmanship. Her father was a railway engineer who helped to lay tracks used for transporting soldiers and munitions to the front lines. The youngest child of four, she was able to receive the same education as her two brothers as this was more acceptable in Paris than in the provinces where her family originated. At the age of 10, she passed a competitive scholarship examination in her state primary school and received a free secondary education. She proceeded to earn an engineering degree in 1937 at the School of Physics and Chemistry in Paris, (ESPCI) specializing in physics after her brother advised her not to study medicine which often led to difficulties for women. She earned a doctorate from the University of Paris in 1950.

== Career and research ==
After graduating at ESPCI Paris in 1937, she struggled to find work as a female physicist and joined Rhône-Poulenc as a chemist. After a month there, she quit and joined the Centre National de la Recherche Scientifique (CNRS) as a technical assistant for Daniel Auger, a plant electrophysiologist. Working with amplifiers to measure electrical potentials of Nitella introduced Albe-Fessard to the limitations of recording bio-electric phenomena.

During her work with Daniel Auger, she met the neuro- and electrophysiologist Alfred Fessard (1900–1982), whom she married in 1942. They had one child, Jean, born in 1958. It was Albe-Fessard who constructed the electronic equipment that Fessard used to make the stimulators and amplifiers necessary for his study of electrophysiology. She went on to become the director of the physiological laboratory for neurology at the Sciences faculty or École pratique des hautes études (EPHE) until her retirement in 1969.

Early on, Albe-Fessard studied the electrical activity of electric fish. Her work on microelectrode recordings of a cat's cerebral cortex in the 1950s was one of the first intracellular recordings of a mammalian brain.

Albe-Fessard published a considerable number of papers documenting her research into the areas of electrophysiology, anatomy and pharmacology. Drawing on the results of her investigations into various animal species (electric ray, rats, cats, mouse lemur), wherever possible she applied her findings to humans, in particular in relation to somatosensory integration and pain. She developed and made use of evolving techniques such as intracellular recording in connection with nervous system activity.

Albe-Fessard chaired the scientific committee of the first international congress on pain in 1975 in Florence, Italy. From 1978 to 1984, she was a member of several other committees.

She was the first president of the International Association for the Study of Pain (IASP) between 1975 and 1978.

== Honours and awards ==
- Knight of the Legion of Honour (1973)
- Officer of the Ordre national du Mérite (1978)
- Elected as the first president of the International Association for the Study of Pain (IASP) (1975–1978)
- Auditorium Salle Denise Albe-Fessard at the French UMR Institut des Neurosciences Paris-Saclay (NeuroPSI) is named after her.

In 2026, Albe-Fessard was announced as one of 72 historical women in STEM whose names have been proposed to be added to the 72 men already celebrated on the Eiffel Tower. The plan was announced by the Mayor of Paris, Anne Hidalgo following the recommendations of a committee led by Isabelle Vauglin of Femmes et Sciences and Jean-François Martins, representing the operating company which runs the Eiffel Tower.

== Notable publications ==
- Atlas stéréotaxique du diencéphale du rat blanc
- Evidence for a projection to the thalamus from the external cuneate nucleus in the monkey
- Labelling of cells in the medulla oblongata of the monkey after injections of HRP in the thalamus
- Deafferentation hypersensitivity in the rat after dorsal rhizotomy: A possible animal model of chronic pain
- Organization otsomatic thalamus in monkey with and without section of dorsal spin 1 tracts
- Supraspinal influence on nociceptive flexion reflex and pain sensation in man
- Electrophysiological evidence for a release of endogenous opiates in stress-induced'Analgesia' in man
- Human nociceptive reactions: effects of spatial summation of afferent input from relatively large diameter fibers
- Depressive effect of high frequency peripheral conditioning stimulation upon the nociceptive component of the human blink reflex. Lack of naloxone effect
- Physiological Properties of neurons in different parts of the cat trigeminal sensory complex
- Further studies on the role of afferent input from relatively large diameter fibers in transmission of nociceptive messages in humans
- Comparison in man of short latency averaged evoked potentials recorded in thalamic and scalp hand zones of representation
- A Demonstration of Tonic Inhibitory and Facilitatory Striatal Actions on Substantia Nigra Neurons
- A stereotaxic apparatus for the study of the central nervous structures in the pig
- Antibiotics and Morphinomimetic Injections Prevent Automutilation Behavior in Rats After Dorsal Rhizotomy
- Comparison of the effects of ureteral calculosis and occlusion on muscular sensitivity to painful stimulation in rats
- Spontaneous neuronal hyperactivity in the medial and intralaminar thalamic nuclei of patients with deafferentation pain
- La Douleur: ses mécanismes et les bases de ses traitements
- Stereotaxic Atlas of the Pig Brain
- L'institut Marey, les dessous de l'histoire
