= Nathalie Drach-Temam =

French computer scientist (born 1966)

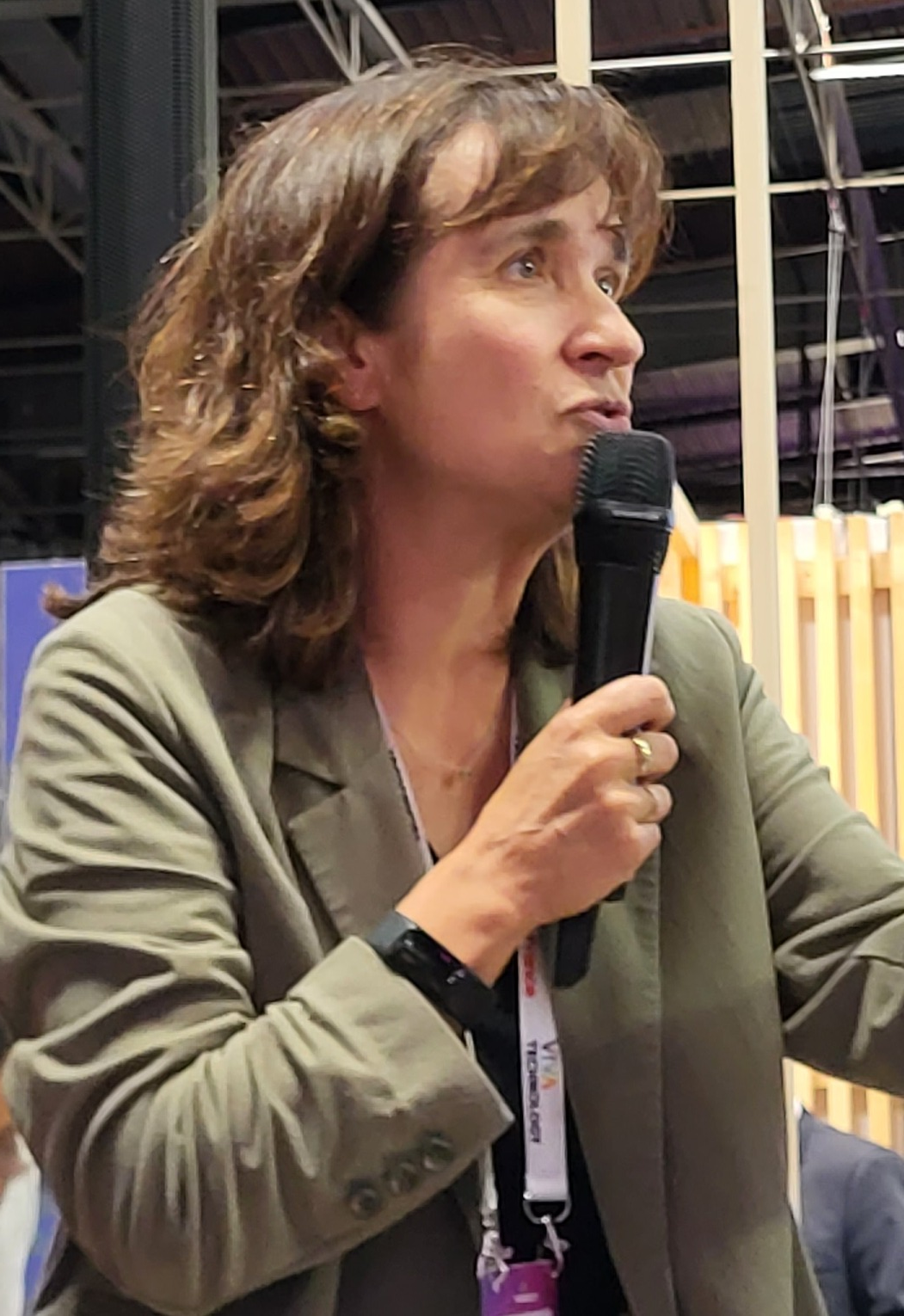
- Drach-Temam in 2025
- Born: 1966 (age 59–60); France
- Education: University of Rennes
- Known for: President of Sorbonne University
- Predecessor: Jean Chambaz
- Scientific career
- Fields: Computer science

Nathalie Drach-Temam (born 1966) is a French computer scientist who became the President of Sorbonne University in 2021 and was re-elected in 2025. She was the first woman to hold that role in almost a thousand years of the university's history. She championed the idea of adding women's names to the Eiffel Tower after it was suggested by a Sorbonne student.

== Biography ==
Drach-Temam was born in 1966 in France. She studied mathematics and received her PhD in computer science from the University of Rennes in 1994 with a dissertation on pipeline optimization in microprocessors. Her doctoral adviser was André Seznec.

After holding teaching and research positions at the University of Rennes in, the University of Paris-Sud and INRIA, the French institute for computer science and automation, Drach-Temam became a professor in 2004, first at Pierre and Marie Curie University (UPMC) and later at Sorbonne University after UPMC merged with it. She specialized in designing computer processors.

Drach-Temam was a Professor of mathematics and computer science and was elected President of Sorbonne University in 2021. She was the first woman to hold that role in almost a thousand years of the university's history. In her new role she made a point of not avoiding controversial subjects like Brexit. She completed her first term in 2025. During that term, she received a proposal from Bernaud Rigaud, a Sorbonne student who chaired a group tasked with generating new ideas. Rigaud, who also worked as a tour guide at the Eiffel Tower, noted that the 72 names commemorated on the tower were all male and suggested that women should be added to the memorial. The university, together with Drach-Temam, agreed to support the initiative. The proposal was later taken up by the Mayor of Paris, and Femmes et Sciences was tasked with selecting the 72 women to be honoured.

In June 2025, ahead of the election for her second term, Drach-Temam announced that the Sorbonne University would be restructured. This was not well received in affected areas of the university. However, later in 2025, she was re-elected for another four-year term.

She announced in October 2025 that Sorbonne University would no longer participate in the Times Higher Education rankings. The University of Zurich had already made a similar move and Yale, Harvard and Columbia universities had abandoned a similar set of rankings. Drach-Temam criticised the rankings because the methodologies were not transparent and they could not be reproduced or questioned. She called them "black boxes" and noted they were run by commercial companies.

In June 2026 she went to Benin to strengthen Sorbonne's partnership with the Sèmè City Institute of Technology and Innovation. Seme City is based in Benin's large city Cotonou and its ambition is to be a world class educational establishment. The relationship with Sorbonne began in 2017 before she was President. The renewed 2026 agreement was for five years and it will allow exchange of staff, students and ideas between the two bodies.

== Honours ==
In 2015, Drach-Temam was appointed a Knight of the Legion of Honour. In 2025, she was awarded the Star of Lithuanian Diplomacy for improving relations between Lithuania and France.
