= Isabelle Vauglin =

French astrophysicist

- Born: 23 February 1961 (age 65)
- Education: Claude Bernard University Lyon 1 (PhD)
- Known for: Leading the search to add 72 women scientists' names to the Eiffel Tower
- Title: President of Femmes et sciences
- Scientific career
- Fields: Astrophysics
- Workplaces: Centre de recherche astrophysique de Lyon
- Thesis: Comparaison de trois caméras infrarouges utilisées pour l'imagerie de noyaux de galaxies dans le domaine 1 - 5 µm (1988)

Isabelle Vauglin (born 23 February 1961) is a French astrophysicist and expert on infrared cameras. Vauglin instigated the project to develop an infrared telescope and camera for the Concordia Station of the French Polar Institute Paul-Émile-Victor (IPEV) in the Antarctic.

Vauglin became the President of Femmes et sciences in 2022. She led the search for 72 women who would be nominated in 2026 to have their names on the Eiffel Tower.

== Career ==
Vauglin studied physics at the University of Besançon and then obtained a Masters degree in physics and advanced diploma in astrophysics and space studies from the University of Paris.

=== Infrared cameras on space telescopes ===
Vauglin's PhD from the Claude Bernard University Lyon 1 was about the use of infrared cameras for imaging galaxy nuclei in the 1-5 micron range. Vauglin is employed by Centre de recherche astrophysique de Lyon.

As an infrared instrument specialist, Vauglin has worked on the design and building of cameras used on telescopes in Hawaii and the European Southern Observatory in Chile.

In 2020 Vauglin proposed creating an infrared telescope and camera for the Concordia base site at Dome C, an Antarctic plateau run by the French Polar Institute Paul-Émile-Victor (IPEV). The location was said to be three times better than other locations because the cold temperatures meant that there was very low background infra-red radiation. The conditions allow a 2-metre telescope to give a similar performance to an 8-metre telescope situated elsewhere or to one of a similar size in space.

In addition to her research, Vauglin has led on several campaigns relating to science and society. In 2019 she launched a project on light pollution called "The Night is Beautiful", which resulted in numerous municipalities in the Rhône region reducing their public lighting.

=== Femmes et Sciences and women in STEM ===
In 2022 Vauglin became the President of Femmes et sciences, taking over from Isabelle Pianet. A key part of her presidency was to investigate representation and equality. Vauglin was particularly concerned about the number of French women who are taking on STEM careers. Only 12% of graduates were women in scientific disciplines and engineering studies and Vauglin has estimated that only 1 in 5 engineers is a woman.

Vauglin co-chaired (with Jean-François Martins, of the operating company which runs the Eiffel Tower) the project to identify a list of 72 women scientists, technologists and mathematicians who, it was proposed, should be added to the 72 men already celebrated on the Eiffel Tower. The original idea in 2022 was inspired by a list of 40 women and this was announced in 2023. The later plan was proposed in March 2025 and the list was announced by the Mayor of Paris, Anne Hidalgo in January 2026.

Vauglin was succeeded in the presidency of Femmes et sciences by Françoise Conan in 2024.

== Distinctions ==
- In 2016, Vauglin received the Déco Chevalière de la Légion d'honneur from the minister Najat Vallaud-Belkacem.
- In 2019, she joined the Academy of Lyon learned society.
- In 2021, Vauglin received the Equality Medal from the Minister for Gender Equality Élisabeth Moreno.
