= Femmes et mathématiques =

Association

The association femmes et mathématiques (English: Association of Women and Mathematics) is a voluntary association promoting women in scientific studies, research, and mathematics created in 1987. This organization currently has about 200 members, including university maths professors, maths teachers, sociologists, philosophers and historians that are interested in the "woman question" in scientific domains.

The Association's primary objectives include encouraging and promoting women in STEM fields, assisting in communication between mathematicians, and promoting equality between genders.

It organizes a forum of young women mathematicians, as well as conferences. They hold a general assembly, either in Paris or outside of the city. The Association also publishes an academic journal.

The association has its headquarters at the Maison des Mathématiciens at l'Institut Henri Poincaré in Paris. It participates in different initiatives with other scholarly and professional societies, in particular the Société mathématique de France (Mathematical Society of France), the Société de mathématiques appliquées et industrielles (Society of Applied and Industrial Maths), the Association des professeurs de mathématiques de l'enseignement public (Association of Math Professors and Public Teachers) and the Union des professeurs de spéciales, as well as the Commission française pour l'enseignement des mathématiques (the French commission for the teaching of mathematics).

In 2000 the organisation supported the creation of the Femmes et Sciences association by Françoise Cyrot-Lackmann, mathematician Huguette Delavault, Françoise Gaspard, physicist Claudine Hermann and engineer Colette Kreder. That organisation inspired and managed the Hypatia project which identified 72 women to be added to the Eiffel Tower. Eleven women mathematicians were chosen and these were Yvette Amice, Edmée Chandon, Yvonne Choquet-Bruhat, Jacqueline Ferrand, Sophie Germain, Geneviève Guitel, Marie-Louise Dubreil-Jacotin, Paulette Libermann, Edith Mourier, Michelle Schatzman and Marie-Hélène Schwartz.

The 2024 president of the Association was Anne Boyé, with Laurence Broze and Lisa Morhaim as the vice presidents.

== Bibliography ==
- (in French) Du côté des mathématiciennes, Edited by Annick Boisseau, Véronique Chauveau, Françoise Delon, Gwenola Madec, avec la participation de Marie-Françoise Roy, through l'Association femmes et mathématiques, Aléas, 2002.
- (in French) Femmes Et Mathématiques. "Nous Sommes... (We Are...)." Femmes Et Maths. Femmes Et Maths, 30 Jan. 2013. Web. 17 Nov. 2013.
- (in French) Rencontres entre artistes et mathématiciennes : Toutes un peu les autres, by T.Chotteau, F.Delmer, P. Jakubowski, S. Paycha, J.Peiffer, Y.Perrin, V. Roca, B. Taquet, through l'Initiative de femmes et mathematiques, Paris : L'Harmattan, 2001.
