= Law of 6 June 2000 (France) =

French law

Loi sur la parité

XIe legislature
- Long title: Loi tendant à favoriser l'égal accès des femmes et des hommes aux mandats électoraux et fonctions électives
- Territorial extent: France
- Enacted by: President of France
- Enacted: 6 June 2000

Legislative history
- Bill citation: NOR: INTX9900134L
- Introduced by: Gouvernement Lionel Jospin
- Passed: 3 May 2000

Related legislation
- Text of the law

Summary
- Promotes gender parity in electoral mandates and elected offices, covering electoral law and human rights

The Law of 6 June 2000 is a French law aimed at promoting equal access for women and men to electoral mandates and elected offices. Known as the "parity law," it mandates that political parties present an equal number of male and female candidates for municipal, regional, senatorial, and European Parliament elections. For these elections, lists that fail to comply with parity requirements are not registered. For legislative elections, the law is incentivized rather than mandatory, with financial penalties imposed on parties that do not present at least 50% female candidates.

With this law, France became the first country in the world to adopt a parity system for single-round elections.

== History ==
=== 20th century ===
An ordinance issued by General de Gaulle on 21 April 1944, titled "Ordinance on the Organization of Public Authorities in France After Liberation," stipulated that "women are voters and eligible under the same conditions as men."

On 21 April 1944, during the October 1945 elections, 33 women were elected as deputies, representing 5.6% of the total deputies.

In 1977, Françoise Giroud proposed in her 100 Measures for Women a limit of 85% representation for one gender in municipal elections.

In 1982, Gisèle Halimi, founder of Choisir la cause des femmes, proposed an amendment to a bill on municipal election organization, limiting the proportion of seats held by one gender to 70%. The Socialist Party adjusted this to 75%. The law was adopted on 27 July 1982. However, deputies challenged an unrelated article before the Constitutional Council. In November 1982, the Council upheld the law but struck down the quota amendment, deeming it unconstitutional for categorizing the French population into eligible persons and voters. The United Nations Convention on the Elimination of All Forms of Discrimination Against Women, ratified by France on 14 December 1983, marked a significant step. It obligated states to take appropriate measures to eliminate discrimination against women in all areas, allowing differential treatment of women and men.

In 1992, Françoise Gaspard, Claude Servan-Schreiber, and Anne LeGall published Au pouvoir citoyennes! advocating for a parity law that affirms gender equality rather than differences. This concept of equality was incorporated into the constitutional law of 8 July 1999. Women's associations, such as Demain la Parité, founded in 1994 by Françoise Gaspard, Claude Servan-Schreiber, and Colette Kreder, emerged to defend parity. This network included feminist organizations like the Association française des femmes diplômées des universités, Elles aussi, Union féminine civique et sociale, and Union professionnelle féminine. The idea of quotas was abandoned.

In 1993, Colette Kreder, Françoise Gaspard, and Claude Servan-Schreiber published the first study on women's participation in legislative elections. The first round on 21 March 1993 included only 1,015 women out of 5,169 candidates, or 19.6%.

On 19 November 1993, the "Manifesto of the 577 for a Parity Democracy," signed by 289 women and 288 men, was published in Le Monde.

In 1994, women comprised only 5.6% of the French Parliament, compared to a European average of 11.6%, ranking France second-to-last, ahead of Greece. At the initiative of Choisir la cause des femmes, a proposal was submitted to the National Assembly and Senate to amend Article 3 of the Constitution to state, "Equal access for women and men to political mandates is ensured by parity."

On 7 April 1995, the Conseil national des femmes françaises and Colette Kreder, for Demain la Parité, organized the "Presidential 95: Women Enter the Campaign" event at the Palais des Congrès in Paris, attended by over a thousand representatives of women's associations. Major presidential candidates, Jacques Chirac, Édouard Balladur, and Lionel Jospin, addressed activists demanding mandatory parity on electoral lists.

In 1996, with women's representation in assemblies stagnant at 6%, Yvette Roudy published the "Manifesto for Parity" in L'Express. Signed by ten women from both left and right—Michèle Barzach, Frédérique Bredin, Édith Cresson, Hélène Gisserot, Catherine Lalumière, Véronique Neiertz, Monique Pelletier, Yvette Roudy, Catherine Tasca, and Simone Veil—it marked a bipartisan effort.

=== 21st century ===
Constitutional Law No. 99-569 of 8 July 1999 amended the Constitution to affirm that "the law promotes equal access for women and men to electoral mandates and elected offices." The Law of 6 June 2000 implemented this constitutional amendment through various measures. It mandated strict gender alternation for single-round election lists and alternation in groups of six for two-round elections. The law does not apply to cantonal elections, municipal elections in towns with fewer than 3,500 inhabitants, or senatorial elections in departments with fewer than three senators. For legislative elections, parity is optional, but parties failing to field 50% candidates of each gender face fines. France became the first country to adopt a parity system for single-round elections.

In 2014, the parity law's outcomes were mixed. Parity was achieved in regional councils, municipal councils of towns with over 3,500 inhabitants, and the European Parliament. However, results were disappointing for two-round, single-member elections, as financial penalties were not sufficiently dissuasive.

In 2009, financial penalties for non-compliance with parity in legislative elections totaled €5 million. Between 2012 and 2017, penalties reached €28 million, or 8% of total party funding. Many parties opted to field male candidates and accept reduced funding.

The Law of 2 August 2014 doubled the financial penalties for non-compliance to encourage greater adherence.

In the 2017 legislative elections, women's representation surged, with 224 women elected, comprising 38.8% of the National Assembly—a historic high. This positioned France among the top 20 countries for women's representation in their primary legislative chamber.

In the 2017 senatorial elections, anti-parity strategies by political parties limited progress, with women's representation rising slightly from 25% to 29.2%.

In the 2022 legislative elections, parity remained unachieved, with women comprising 37.3% of deputies, a slight decrease from 2017.

== Legislative background ==
- Ordinance of 21 April 1944, Article 17 states, "Women are voters and eligible under the same conditions as men."
- United Nations Convention on the Elimination of All Forms of Discrimination Against Women (CEDAW), adopted on 18 December 1979 and ratified by France on 14 December 1983. Articles 7 and 8 mandate equal participation in political and public life at national and international levels.
- Constitutional Law No. 99-569 of 8 July 1999 on gender equality amended Articles 3 and 4 of the 1958 Constitution, adding that the law "promotes equal access for men and women to electoral mandates and elected offices" and that political parties contribute to this principle.

== Subsequent key legislation ==
- Law No. 2007-128 of 31 January 2007 extended parity obligations to regional and municipal executive designations (for towns with 3,500+ inhabitants) and increased penalties for non-compliance in legislative election candidacies (75% of the deviation from the average).
- Constitutional Law of 23 July 2008, No. 2008-724, modernized Fifth Republic institutions, adding to Article 1 of the Constitution: "The law promotes equal access for women and men to electoral mandates, elected offices, and professional and social responsibilities."
- Law for Real Equality Between Women and Men, No. 2014-873 of 4 August 2014, doubled financial penalties for non-compliance with parity in party funding.

== See also ==
- Women in politics in France
- French Fifth Republic
- Feminism in France

== Bibliography ==
- Guéraiche, William (1999). Les femmes et le politique [Women and Politics] (in French). Paris: Éditions de l'Atelier. p. 304. ISBN 2-7082-3468-4.
- Gaspard, Françoise; Servan-Schreiber, Claude; Le Gall, Anne (1992). Au pouvoir, citoyennes! Liberté, égalité, parité [To Power, Citizens! Liberty, Equality, Parity] (in French). Paris: Éditions du Seuil. p. 180. ISBN 2-02-017360-3.
- Gaspard, Françoise; Bataille, Philippe (1999). Comment les femmes changent la politique : et pourquoi les hommes résistent [How Women Are Changing Politics: And Why Men Resist] (in French). Paris: La Découverte. p. 200. ISBN 2-7071-3085-0.
- Jenson, Jane; Sineau, Mariette (1995). Mitterrand et les françaises, un rendez-vous manqué [Mitterrand and French Women: A Missed Opportunity] (in French). Paris: Presses De Sciences Po. p. 104. ISBN 2-7246-0659-0.
- Martin, Jacqueline (1998). Parité et représentations politiques [Parity and Political Representation] (in French). Toulouse: Presses universitaires Le Mirail. p. 198.
- Savigneau, Josyane; Catinchi, Philippe-Jean (2013). Les femmes : du droit de vote à la parité [Women: From the Right to Vote to Parity] (in French). Paris: Le Monde. p. 104. ISBN 978-2-36156-098-0.
- Scott, Joan W. (2005). Parité ! L'universel et la différence des sexes [Parité! The Universal and the Difference of the Sexes] (in French). Paris: Éditions Albin Michel. p. 254. ISBN 2-226-15881-2.
- Sineau, Mariette (2011). Femmes et pouvoir sous la Ve République : de l'exclusion à l'entrée dans la course présidentielle [Women and Power in the Fifth Republic: From Exclusion to Entering the Presidential Race] (in French). Paris: Presses De Sciences Po. p. 320. ISBN 978-2-7246-1220-2.
