= Marie Charpentier =

French mathematician

- Charpentier in 1932
- Born: Jeanne Radegonde Marie Charpentier; 30 October 1903; Poitiers, France
- Died: October 9, 1994 (aged 90); Poitiers, France

Academic background
- Education: University of Poitiers
- Thesis: On the Peano points of a first-order differential equation (1931)
- Doctoral advisor: Paul Montel

Academic work
- Discipline: Mathematics
- Institutions: University of Rennes

Jeanne Radegonde Marie Charpentier (30 October 1903 – 9 October 1994) was a French mathematician. She was the first woman to obtain a doctorate in pure mathematics in France, and the second woman, after Marie-Louise Dubreil-Jacotin, to obtain a faculty position in mathematics at a university in France.

== Early life and education ==
Jeanne Radegonde Marie Charpentier was born in Poitiers, the daughter of Michel Marie Eugène Charpentier and Marie Thérèse Geneviève Rondelet, on either 29 or 30 October 1903.

Charpentier joined the Société mathématique de France in 1930, possibly their second female member after Édmée Chandon. She was a student of Georges Bouligand at the University of Poitiers, where she completed her thesis in 1931 with Paul Montel as chair. Her dissertation was Sur les points de Peano d'une equation différentielle du premier ordre [On the Peano points of a first-order differential equation].

== Career ==
Charpentier did postdoctoral studies with George Birkhoff at Harvard University, and was an invited speaker on geometry at the 1932 International Congress of Mathematicians in Zurich. However, she could not obtain a faculty position in France at that time, and instead had to support herself as a teacher at the high school level for some years.

She was appointed to her faculty position in 1942, at the University of Rennes. She became full professor there. Rennes university's maths department was different in 1960 because it had a relatively high percentage of women. There were fifteen professors and three of them were women. Charpentier was one of them and the other two were Huguette Delavault and Paulette Libermann. Huguette Delavault went on to champion the role of women and Libermann was to be known for differential geometry.

She retired in 1973.
