= Broze (disambiguation) =

Broze is a commune in southern France. Broze may also refer to:

- Broze, Chitral, Pakistan, an administrative unit
- Emma Broze (born 1995), French golfer
- Laurence Broze (born 1960), Belgian mathematical economist
- Vanessa Broze, actress in the science-fiction series Forbidden Science
