= Beáta Nagy =

Hungarian sociologist (born 1964)

- Born: 1964 (age 61–62); Balassagyarmat, Hungary
- Awards: Erdei Ferenc Prize (1996); Polányi Károly Prize (2020); Corvinus University “Egyetemért” Medal (2012)

Academic background
- Education: Karl Marx University of Economic Sciences

Academic work
- Discipline: Sociology; Economics
- Sub-discipline: Gender relations in the labour market; Work–life balance; Careers of women managers
- Institutions: Corvinus University of Budapest
- Website: beatanagy.com

Beáta Nagy (born 1964) is a Hungarian sociologist and economist whose research explores gender relations in the labour market, work–life balance and the careers of women managers. She is professor of sociology at the Corvinus University of Budapest and, since 2021, president of the Hungarian Sociological Association.

== Early life and education ==
Nagy was born in the northern Hungarian town of Balassagyarmat in 1964.

She studied economics and sociology at the Karl Marx University of Economic Sciences, graduating in 1986 with an MA in both subjects.

Her Candidate of Sciences (CSc) degree in sociology was awarded by the Hungarian Academy of Sciences in 1997, and she completed her habilitation at Corvinus University in 2008.

== Career ==
After early appointments as teaching assistant and lecturer, Nagy joined Corvinus University’s Institute of Sociology and Social Policy in 1990 and was promoted to full professor in 2015.

In 2001 she co-founded the Centre for Gender and Culture at Corvinus, which she has been co-directing since.

Her empirical projects have examined gendered management cultures in multinational corporations, the impact of digital technology on executive women, and the work–family strategies of Central-European parents during the COVID-19 lockdown.

Nagy's expert commentary on wage inequality and discrimination has been widely cited in the Hungarian press, while recent interviews have addressed the politicisation of motherhood and gender policy debates.

== Selected publication ==
=== Books ===
Gender revolution? The obstacle course for women becoming leaders. Budapest, Hungary: Gondolat Publishing House. 2024. p. 250. ISBN 9789635565276.

== Awards and recognition ==
The Hungarian Sociological Association honoured Nagy with the Erdei Ferenc Prize in 1996 and the Polányi Károly Prize in 2020; she also received the Corvinus University “Egyetemért” Medal in 2012.

In November 2018, she was named Woman Scientist of the Month by European Platform of Women Scientists.
