= Anne Amieux =

Anne-Léontine Nicolas Amieux (18 June 1871 – 5 September 1961) was a French educator. She was principal of the École normale supérieure de jeunes filles at Sèvres from 1919 to 1936.

== Early life and education ==
She was born in Lyon on 18 June 1871 and was educated at the girls' lycée there. She continued her studies at the École normale supérieure de jeunes filles at Sèvres where she received her qualification to teach science. In 1905, she was awarded a travel bursary by the philanthropist Albert Kahn. She was a founding member of the Association française des femmes diplômées des universités and also served on the council for the International Federation of University Women.

== Career ==
Amieux taught at a girls' lycée in Tournon-sur-Rhône and at the Lycée Victor-Hugo in Paris. She was founding principal at the Lycée Jules-Ferry. One of her students was the future mathematician, Marie-Louise Dubreil-Jacotin.

In 1933, she was named a Chevalier in the French Legion of Honour.

Amieux died on 5 September 1961 in the commune of Les Bréviaires in Seine et Oise.
