= DJL =

DJL may refer to:

- David Jones (department store)
- Adelaide Steamship Company, previously called DJL Limited.
- Dubreil-Jacotin–Long equation, or DJL equation
