= Marie-Louise Dubreil-Jacotin =

French mathematician (1905–1972)

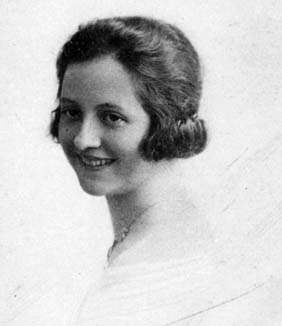
- Born: Marie-Louise Jacotin; 7 July 1905; Paris
- Died: 19 October 1972 (aged 67)
- Education: École Normale Supérieure
- Known for: Dubreil-Jacotin–Long equation
- Spouse: Paul Dubreil
- Scientific career
- Fields: Fluid mechanics; Abstract algebra
- Workplaces: University of Rennes; University of Lyon; University of Poitiers; University of Paris; Pierre and Marie Curie University
- Thesis: Sur la détermination rigoureuse des ondes permanentes périodiques d'ampleur finie (1934)
- Doctoral advisor: Henri Villat

Signature
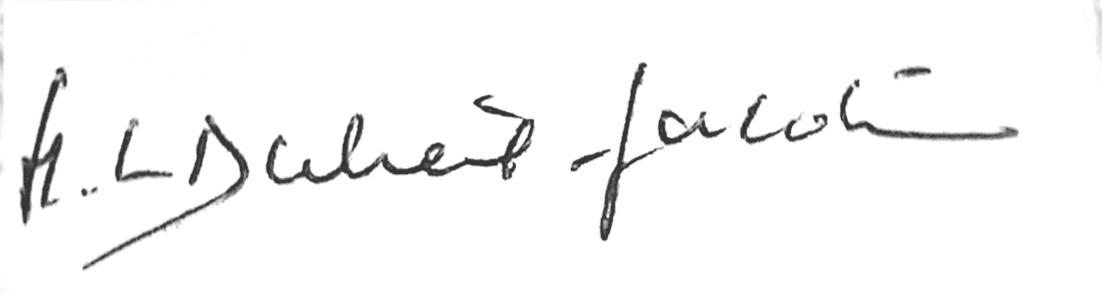

Marie-Louise Dubreil-Jacotin (7 July 1905 – 19 October 1972) was a French mathematician. She was the second woman in France to obtain a doctorate in pure mathematics and the first to become a full professor of mathematics. She is remembered for her contributions to fluid mechanics and abstract algebra. In semigroup theory, the Dubreil-Jacotin semigroups are named after her, as is the Dubreil-Jacotin–Long (DJL) equation, one of the main models to describe internal gravity waves in fluid mechanics. Dubreil-Jacotin was president of the French Mathematical Society.

== Early life and education ==
Marie-Louise Jacotin was born in Paris on 7 July 1905. Her father, M. Jacotin, was a lawyer who ran the legal department of a French bank. Her mother (nee Rodon) came from a family of glassblowers, originally of Greek origin, but settled in Briare in Loiret. Her mother was her first teacher and her parents recognised her intelligence at an early age. At this time, secondary education for girls in France was not expected, but her father registered her to attend the Lycée Jules-Ferry which had opened in 1913, founded by the Principal, Anne Amieux.

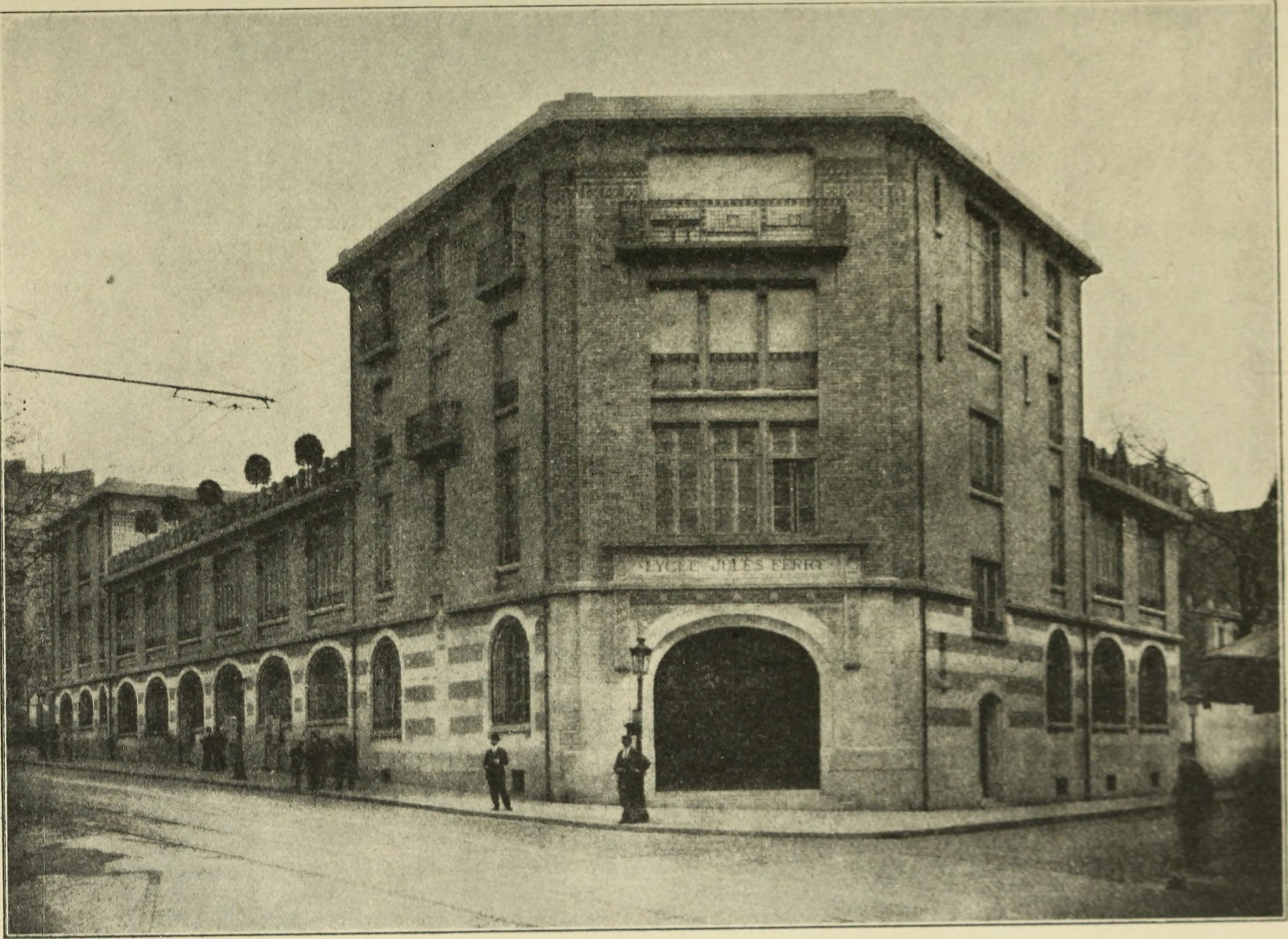
Lycée Jules Ferry c. 1910s

Anna Cartan, the mathematics teacher at the Lycée Jules-Ferry was a sister of mathematician Élie Cartan. After passing the baccalaureate, Marie-Louise Jacotin was allowed to continue studying mathematics at the Collège de Chaptal as a result of the influence of M. Coulom, head of the institution and father of one her school friends, Denise Coulom. On her second attempt, she placed second in the entrance examination for the École Normale Supérieure in 1926 (tied with Claude Chevalley), but by a ministerial decree was moved down to 21st position. After the intervention of Fernand Hauser, the editor of the Journal of the ENS, she was admitted to the school. Her teachers there included Henri Lebesgue and Jacques Hadamard, and she finished her studies in 1929.

With the encouragement of ENS director Ernest Vessiot Dubreil-Jacotin travelled to Oslo to work with Vilhelm Bjerknes, under whose influence she became interested in the mathematics of waves and the work of Tullio Levi-Civita in this subject. She returned to Paris in 1930, where she married mathematician Paul Dubreil on 28 June. The couple went on a tour of the mathematics centres of Germany and Italy, including a visit with Tullio Levi-Civita in Rome. The Dubreils returned to France again in 1931.

While her husband taught at Lille, Dubreil-Jacotin continued her research, finishing a doctorate in 1934 concerning the existence of infinitely many different waves in ideal liquids, under the supervision of Henri Villat. Before her, the only women to obtain a doctorate in mathematics in France were Marie Charpentier in 1931 (also in pure mathematics) and Edmée Chandon in 1930 (in astronomy and geodesy).

In her work, she introduced a non-linear equation to describe gravity waves in water in 1932. Her model was popularised by Robert R. Long in the English language, which later became known as the Dubreil-Jacotin–Long (DJL) equation. She also developed the Dubreil-Jacotin transformation in 1934 to deal with certain types of nonlinear differential equations.

== Career and research ==
When her husband moved to Nancy, Dubreil-Jacotin was unable to obtain a faculty position at the same university because that may have been seen as nepotism. She became a research assistant at the University of Rennes. She was promoted to a teaching position in 1938, and she became an assistant professor at the University of Lyon in 1939, while continuing to teach at Rennes. In 1943 she became a full professor at the University of Poitiers, the first woman to become a full professor of mathematics in France, and in 1955 she was awarded a chair there in differential and integral calculus. In 1956 she moved to the University of Paris and after the university split she held a professorship at the Pierre and Marie Curie University.

In the 1950s, motivated by the study of averaging operators for turbulence, Dubreil-Jacotin's interests turned towards abstract algebra. She later performed research in semigroups and graded algebraic structures in collaboration with her husband. She was the author of two textbooks, one on lattice theory and the other on abstract algebra. As well as her technical publications, Dubreil-Jacotin was the author of a work in the history of mathematics, Portraits of women mathematicians. She was president of the French Mathematical Society for 1952.

== Legacy ==
Rue Marie-Louise-Dubreil-Jacotin, a street in the 13th arrondissement of Paris within Paris Diderot University, is named after her, and the University of Poitiers also has a street with the same name.

In 2026, Dubreil-Jacotin was announced as one of 72 historical women in STEM whose names have been proposed to be added to the 72 men already celebrated on the Eiffel Tower. The plan was conceived by a student and tour guide named Bernard Rigaud and it was announced by the Mayor of Paris, Anne Hidalgo following the recommendations of a committee led by Isabelle Vauglin of Femmes et Sciences and Jean-François Martins, representing the operating company which runs the Eiffel Tower.
