= Lycée Jules-Ferry =

Lycée Jules-Ferry may refer to:

- Lycée Jules-Ferry (Cannes), Cannes
- Lycée Jules-Ferry (Coulommiers), Coulommiers, Seine-et-Marne
- Lycée Jules-Ferry (Montpellier), Montpellier
- Lycée Jules-Ferry (Paris)
- Lycée Jules-Ferry de Saint-Dié-des-Vosges, Saint-Dié-des-Vosges
- Lycée Jules-Ferry (Versailles), Versailles
