= Henri Villat =

French mathematician

- Born: 24 December 1879; Paris
- Died: 19 March 1972 (aged 92)
- Education: University of Montpellier
- Scientific career
- Fields: Mathematics
- Workplaces: University of Paris
- Doctoral advisor: Marcel Brillouin; Charles Émile Picard
- Doctoral students: Marie-Louise Dubreil-Jacotin; Caius Iacob; Jean Leray; Huguette Delavault

Henri René Pierre Villat (French: [vila]; 24 December 1879 – 19 March 1972) was a French mathematician. He was professor of fluid mechanics at the University of Paris from 1927 until his death. Villat became a member of the French Academy of Sciences in 1932, and its president in 1948.
