= Émile Picard =

French mathematician (1856–1941)

Émile Picard FRS(For) FRSE
- Born: Charles Émile Picard; 24 July 1856; Paris, France
- Died: 11 December 1941 (aged 85); Paris, France
- Education: École Normale Supérieure
- Known for: Picard functor Picard group Picard horn Picard modular group Picard modular surface Picard theorem Picard variety Picard–Lefschetz formula Picard–Lindelöf theorem Picard–Vessiot theory Picard–Fuchs equation Painlevé transcendents
- Awards: ForMemRS (1909); Poncelet Prize (1886)
- Scientific career
- Fields: Mathematics
- Workplaces: University of Paris; École Centrale Paris
- Thesis: Applications des complexes lineaires a l'etude des surfaces et des courbes gauches (1877)
- Doctoral advisor: Gaston Darboux
- Doctoral students: Sergei Bernstein; Paul Dubreil; Jacques Hadamard; Gaston Julia; Traian Lalescu; Philippe Le Corbeiller; Paul Painlevé; Mihailo Petrović; Simion Stoilow; Ernest Vessiot; Henri Villat; André Weil; Stanisław Zaremba

Charles Émile Picard (French: [ʃaʁl emil pikaʁ]; 24 July 1856 – 11 December 1941) was a French mathematician. He was elected the fifteenth member to occupy seat 1 of the Académie française in 1924.

== Life ==
He was born in Paris on 24 July 1856 and educated there at the Lycée Henri-IV. He then studied mathematics at the École Normale Supérieure.

Picard's mathematical papers, textbooks, and many popular writings exhibit an extraordinary range of interests, as well as an impressive mastery of the mathematics of his time. Picard's little theorem states that every nonconstant entire function takes every value in the complex plane, with perhaps one exception. Picard's great theorem states that an analytic function with an essential singularity takes every value infinitely often, with perhaps one exception, in any neighborhood of the singularity. He made important contributions in the theory of differential equations, including work on Picard–Vessiot theory, Painlevé transcendents and his introduction of a kind of symmetry group for a linear differential equation. He also introduced the Picard group in the theory of algebraic surfaces, which describes the classes of algebraic curves on the surface modulo linear equivalence. In connection with his work on function theory, he was one of the first mathematicians to use the emerging ideas of algebraic topology. In addition to his theoretical work, Picard made contributions to applied mathematics, including the theories of telegraphy and elasticity. His collected papers run to four volumes.

Louis Couturat studied integral calculus with Picard in 1891–1892, taking detailed notes of the lectures. These notes were preserved and now are available in three cahiers from Internet Archive.

Like his contemporary, Henri Poincaré, Picard was much concerned with the training of mathematics, physics, and engineering students. He wrote a classic textbook on analysis and one of the first textbooks on the theory of relativity. Picard's popular writings include biographies of many leading French mathematicians, including his father in law, Charles Hermite.

Picard was an International Honorary Member of the American Academy of Arts and Sciences, an International Member of the United States National Academy of Sciences, and an International Member of the American Philosophical Society.

== Family ==
In 1881 he married Marie, the daughter of Charles Hermite.

== Society ==
Charles Émile Picard was one of the founder members in 1930 of the Society of Friends of André-Marie Ampère which was created to develop the first science museum in France, the Ampère Museum close to Lyon.

== Works ==
- 1891–96: Traité d'Analyse. Paris: Gauthier-Villars et fils. 1891. OCLC 530823.
- 1905: La science Moderne et son état Actuel. Paris: E. Flammarion. 1914. OCLC 43307396.
- 1906 : (with Georges Simart) Theorie des Fonctions Algebrique de deux Variables Independente volume 2, via Internet Archive
- 1922: La Théorie de la Relativité et ses Applications à l'astronomie. Paris: Gauthier-Villars. 1922. OCLC 1025334.
- 1922: Discours et Mélanges. Paris: Gauthier-Villars. 1922. OCLC 4855336.
- 1931: Éloges et Discours Académiques. Paris: s.n. OCLC 13473598.
- 1978–81: Œuvres de Ch.-É. Picard. Vol. I–IV. Paris: Centre National de la Recherche Scientifique. OCLC 4615520.

== See also ==
- Émile Picard Medal
- Picard modular group
- Picard modular surface
- Picard horn
- Bregille Funicular
