= Anna Cartan =

French mathematician

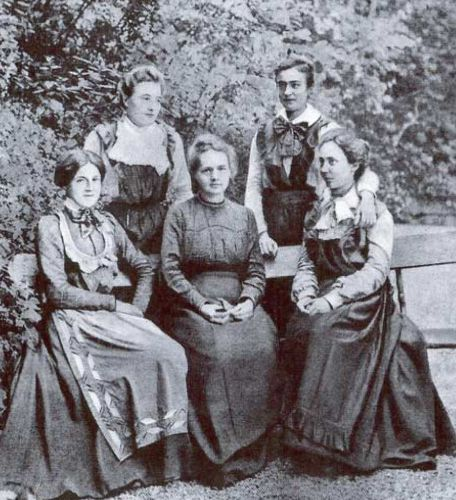
- Standing (left to right): Marthe Baillaud (later Privat) and Anna Cartan. Sitting (left to right): Madeleine Routaboul (later Besseteaux), Marie Curie and Eugénie Cotton.
- Born: Annette Cartan; 15 May 1878
- Died: 1923 (aged 44–45)
- Education: École normale supérieure de jeunes filles
- Relatives: Élie Cartan (brother)
- Scientific career
- Fields: Mathematics
- Workplaces: Lycée Jules-Ferry (Paris)

Anna Cartan (15 May 1878 – 1923) was a French mathematician, teacher and textbook author who was a student of Marie Curie and mathematician Jules Tannery.

== Early years ==
Annette Cartan, known as Anna, was the youngest child born to Anne Florentine Cottaz (1841–1927) and Joseph Antoine Cartan (1837–1917), who was the village blacksmith. Anna had an elder sister Jeanne-Marie (1867–1931) who became a dressmaker, a brother Léon (1872–1956) who became a blacksmith working in his father's smithy, and a middle brother Élie Cartan (1869–1951) who became an acclaimed mathematician and sire of a family of mathematicians, notably his first son, Henri Cartan, who later became influential in the field.

Anna's brother, Élie Cartan, later recalled that the family was very poor and his childhood had passed under "blows of the anvil, which started every morning from dawn," and that "his mother, during those rare minutes when she was free from taking care of the children and the house, was working with a spinning wheel".

== Mathematics career ==
As the family was poor, it would have been very unusual for any of the children to attend college, but in 1901, partly under Élie's influence, Anna Cartan entered École normale supérieure de jeunes filles in Sèvres near Paris, France. Anna chose to pursue mathematics to become a secondary school teacher. Among the courses she attended were those led by Marie Curie (who taught physics there from 1900 to 1906) and Jules Tannery. One of her friends was the scientist and women's rights activist Eugénie (Feytis) Cotton who would become director of the school in 1936. Another friend was Marthe Baillaud, the niece of Jules Tannery. Anna completed her studies in mathematics in 1904 and taught the subject at the high school in Poitiers, France from 1904 to 1906, and then she taught in Dijon from 1906 to 1908.

In 1908, Cartan received a one-year scholarship established by a French philanthropist Albert Kahn to travel around the world to allow her to "enrich her skills and future education by direct knowledge of the world". Among the places she visited were the United States (New York, St. Louis, Chicago, Boston and Niagara Falls), Quebec, Mexico and Cuba. After the tour, she returned to Dijon and taught there until 1916. Then she taught at the Lycée Jules-Ferry in Paris, where one of her pupils was future mathematician, Marie-Louise Dubreil-Jacotin. Then, until 1920, at the Sèvres application school, annexed to the normal school.

In 1912 and 1913, Cartan wrote two books on arithmetic and geometry for girls, and later she co-authored two more textbooks for both boys and girls with her brother Élie.

Cartan died of cancer in 1923.

== Works ==
- Arithmetic and geometry, first year, secondary education for young girls, by Anna Cartan, 1912 and 1921.
- Arithmetic, secondary education for young girls, second year, by Anna Cartan, 1913 and 1918.
- Arithmetic, secondary education, boys and girls, classes of 4th and 3rd, by Anna Cartan and Élie Cartan, 1928 and 1931.
- Arithmetic, secondary education, boys and girls, grades 6 and 5, by Anna Cartan and Élie Cartan, 1926.
