= Françoise Cyrot-Lackmann =

French condensed-matter physicist (born 1940)

- Born: 1940 (age 85–86); La Baule, France
- Education: Laboratoire de Physique des Solides (PhD)
- Known for: Advocating for gender parity in science
- Scientific career
- Fields: Condensed matter physics
- Institutions: French National Centre for Scientific Research; Mission for Parity in Science and Technology

Françoise Cyrot-Lackmann, (born 1940), is a French condensed-matter physicist, and research director at the Centre National de la Recherche Scientifique. She co-founded the association Femmes et Sciences (Women and Science) and led the French government's Mission for Parity in Science and Technology. She is known for her promotion of gender parity in science and technology as well as for her work as a physicist.

== Early life and education ==
Françoise Lackmann was born in 1940 in La Baule (Loire-Atlantique). She gained a doctorate in physics 1968 at the Laboratory of Solid-State Physics in Orsay (Essonne).

== Career ==
Cyrot-Lackmann was appointed Centre National de la Recherche Scientifique (CNRS) scientific delegate for the Rhône-Alpes region in 1983.

From 1989 to 1996, she directed the Laboratory for the Study of Electronic Properties of Solids in Grenoble.

In 2000, Cyrot-Lackmann founded the Association Femmes et Sciences (Women in Science) with fellow scientists Huguette Delavault, Françoise Gaspard, Claudine Hermann, Colette Kreder and l’association femmes et mathématiques. In November 2000, she provided figures for the percentage of women biologists in France (45%) and for physics and maths (15%).

In 2001, she was appointed head of the French government office, Mission for Parity in Science and Technology (MPST). The MPST created the Irène Joliot-Curie Prize in the same year. In 2002, MPST was due to receive over 300,00 Euros to promote the participation of women in France in science.

Cyrot-Lackmann has written about the gender gap in science. In 2026, as part of the Association Femmes & Sciences she pushed for 72 women scientists to be commemorated in the list of names on the Eiffel tower.

Cyrot-Lackmann's key contribution to condensed-matter physics is the development of the moment method for calculating the local electronic density of states (DOS) of solids within the tight-binding approximation.

== Selected publications ==
- Hermann, C., Cyrot-Lackmann. F. Women in Science in France. Science in Context. 2002;15(4):529-556. doi:10.1017/S0269889702000637
- Cyrot-Lackmann, F. Sur le calcul de la cohésion et de la tension superficielle des métaux de transition par une méthode de liaisons fortes. Journal of Physics and Chemistry of Solids July, 1968;29(7) 1235-1243 doi:10.1016/0022-3697(68)90216-3
