= Charles-Michel Marle =

French engineer and mathematician (born 1934)

- Born: 26 November 1934 (age 91); Guelma, French Algeria
- Education: École polytechnique
- Scientific career
- Fields: Differential geometry
- Workplaces: Pierre and Marie Curie University; Sorbonne University
- Thesis: Sur l'établissement des équations de la dynamique des fluides relativistes dissipatifs (1968)
- Doctoral advisor: André Lichnerowicz
- Website: marle.perso.math.cnrs.fr

Charles-Michel Marle (French pronunciation: [ʃaʁlmiʃɛl maʁl]; born 26 November 1934) is a French engineer and mathematician, currently a Professor Emeritus at Sorbonne University (formerly Pierre and Marie Curie University).

== Biography ==
Charles-Michel Marle completed in 1951 his primary and secondary education in Constantine, Algeria. He was a pupil of the preparatory classes for the grandes écoles at the Lycée Bugeaud in Algiers: higher mathematics in 1951-1952, then special mathematics in 1952-1953. He was admitted to the École Polytechnique in 1953. When he left this school in 1955, he opted for the Corps des mines.

He did his military service as a sub-lieutenant at the Engineering School in Angers from October 1955 to February 1956, then in Algeria during the war until 30 December 1956.

In 1957 he began attending the École Nationale Supérieure des Mines in Paris and from October 1957 to September 1958 he attended the École nationale supérieure du pétrole et des moteurs and completed various internships in the oil industry in France and Algeria. Returning to the École des mines in October 1958, his last year of study was interrupted in 1959 by the decision of the Minister of Industry, to send all junior civil servants of category A to Algeria to participate in the Constantine Plan. He was then attached to the short-lived Common organisation of the Saharan regions and worked in Algiers, the Sahara and Paris on various industrial projects.

Between 1959 and 1969 he was seconded by the Corps des Mines to the French Institute of Petroleum (IFP), where he was research engineer, head of department and director of division. While working at this Institute he obtained a degree in mathematics and in 1968 he defended a doctoral thesis under the supervision of André Lichnerowicz.

In 1969 he changed his career and entered higher education, becoming a lecturer at the University of Besançon. In 1975 he moved to Pierre and Marie Curie University in Paris, and was appointed professor at this university in 1977. In 1983 he was elected corresponding member of the French Academy of sciences. In 1989, he was appointed visiting professor at the University of California at Berkeley, for a semester of scientific courses, collaborating in particular with professors Jerrold E. Marsden and Alan Weinstein. He retired in September 2000 and since then he is Professor Emeritus.

Charles-Michel Marle is the great-great-grandson of the grammarian L. C. Marle (1799-1860), author of an attempt at spelling reform around 1840.

== Scientific work ==
While working at the French Institute of Petroleum, Marle's research focused on fluid flows in porous media, which are being investigated for applications in hydrocarbon field development. He also published a book on the subject, developing a course that he taught at the École nationale du pétrole et des moteurs.

Transitioning from applied to pure mathematics, in his PhD thesis he worked on fluid dynamics and the Boltzmann relativistic equation.

Since the early 1970s he has worked mainly in the field of differential geometry, notably on Hamiltonian group actions and Poisson geometry, and its applications to mechanics.

With his colleague Paulette Libermann (1919-2007) he published in 1987 a research-level book on symplectic geometry and geometric mechanics. He has recently published another book, taking up part of the previous one, exposing recent results obtained in this field since 1987.

== Honours and awards ==
- French Academy of sciences laboratory prize for his thesis work, 1973.
- Member of the Mathematical Society of France, the French Physical Society and the American Mathematical Society.
