= Brigitte Mühlenbruch =

German chemist (born 1936)

Brigitte Mühlenbruch (born July 20th 1936) is a German chemist.

She is the President of the European Platform of Women Scientists in Brussels. She is a member of the European Commission's Network of Women in Decision Making in Politics and the Economy, and Vice President of the Christiane Nüsslein-Volhard Foundation in Germany.

== Life ==
After finishing her PhD in pharmaceutical chemistry, Mühlenbruch worked as a scientist at the University of Bonn for almost 20 years before becoming the university's first Equal Opportunities Commissioner. Since the late 1980s her research and concept development have focused on gender equality, gender mainstreaming, and programmes and processes regarding the recruitment and retention of women scientists in Germany as well as at the EU level.

In 1996 she was awarded with the German Federal Cross of Merit. That same year she was co-author of the book 100 Jahre Frauenstudium : Frauen der Rheinischen Friedrich-Wilhelms-Universität Bonn alongside Annette Kuhn, Valentine Rothe.

She spoke at an international conference, Barriers to women's career in Academia: A dialogue between social psychology and policy, sponsored by the European Science Foundation and held in Perugia on the 6 October 2001.

In 2003, Mühlenbruch was a member of the Steering Committee for the Study on Networks of Women Scientists in Brussels which confirmed the need of a network for women scientists at European level. Mühlenbruch was Managing Director of the Center of Excellence Women and Science (CEWS) in Bonn from 2000 until 2005, managing several research projects funded by the German government and the EU in the field of gender equality in science. Under her leadership, CEWS drafted the winning proposal for the establishment of the European Platform of Women Scientists and signed the contract with the European Commission in 2005. Brigitte Mühlenbruch was on the Founding Board (the democratic decision-making body) of the European Platform of Women Scientists until its formal establishment as an AISBL.

In 2005 she and Almuthe Schlüter wrote a paper for the European Commission about Databases of Women Scientists: Overview, Best Practice Guideline and Future Perspectives.

At the EPWS Paris Conference "New Perspectives on Women Scientists Careers in Europe" which held on June 11, 2014 at the French Ministry of Higher Education and Research, Amphitheater Stourdzé, Paris, Mühlenbruch gave the welcome address.
