= Paulette Libermann =

French mathematician (1919–2007)

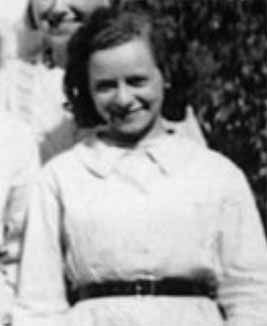
- Born: 14 November 1919; Paris
- Died: 10 July 2007 (aged 87); Montrouge
- Education: Louis Pasteur University
- Scientific career
- Fields: Differential geometry
- Workplaces: Paris Diderot University
- Thesis: Sur le problème d'équivalence de certaines structures infinitésimales (1953)
- Doctoral advisor: Charles Ehresmann
- Other academic advisors: Elie Cartan
- Doctoral students: Waldyr Muniz Oliva

Paulette Libermann (14 November 1919 – 10 July 2007) was a French mathematician who became a full professor at the University of Rennes in 1958. As a researcher, she specialized in differential geometry and global analysis, in particular G-structures, Cartan's equivalence method, and contact geometry. In 1987 she wrote together with Charles-Michel Marle one of the first textbooks on symplectic geometry and analytical mechanics.

In symplectic geometry, the Libermann foliation is named after her.

== Biography ==
=== Early life and education ===
Born on 14 November 1919 in Paris, Libermann was one of three sisters belonging to a family of Russian-Ukrainian Yiddish-speaking Jewish immigrants to France.

After attending the Lycée Lamartine, she began her university studies in 1938 at the École normale supérieure de jeunes filles, a college in Sèvres for training women to become school teachers. Due to the reforms of the new director Eugénie Cotton, who wanted her school to be at the same level of École Normale Supérieure, Libermann was taught by leading mathematicians including Élie Cartan, Jacqueline Ferrand and André Lichnerowicz.

Two years later, upon completion of her studies, she was prevented from taking the agrégation and becoming a teacher because of the anti-Jewish laws instituted by the German occupation. However, thanks to a scholarship provided by Cotton, she began doing research under Cartan's supervision.

In 1942, she and her family escaped Paris for Lyon, where they hid from the persecutions by Klaus Barbie for two years. After the liberation of Paris in 1944, she returned to Sèvres and completed her studies, obtaining the agrégation. From 1945 to 1947, she studied at Oxford University.

=== Career ===
Libermann taught briefly in a school at Douai, and then got a scholarship to study at Oxford University between 1945 and 1947, where she obtained a bachelor's degree under the supervision of J. H. C. Whitehead.

From 1947 to 1951 she held a teaching position at a school for girls in Strasbourg. However, at the encouragement of Élie Cartan, during this period she also continued her research at Université Louis Pasteur under the leadership of Charles Ehresmann. Together with Ehresmann, she published a number of papers.

In 1951 she left teaching for a research position at the Centre national de la recherche scientifique, and in 1953 she completed her doctoral thesis, entitled Sur le problème d’équivalence de certaines structures infinitésimales [On the equivalence problem of certain infinitesimal structures], under the supervision of Charles Ehresmann. The thesis documents her investigation of foliations of symplectic manifolds and defined what would later be known as the affine structure of a Lagrangian foliation.

After her PhD, Libermann was appointed assistant professor at the University of Rennes in 1954 and full professor at the same university in 1958. The university's maths department was different in 1960 because it had a relatively high percentage of women. There were fifteen professors and three of them were women. Libermann was one of them and the other two were Marie Charpentier and Huguette Delavault. Charpentier taught mechanics and Huguette Delavault was to be known for championing the role of women.

In 1966 Libermann moved to the University of Paris, becoming one of the first few women to receive a full professorship in a French university, and when the university split in 1968, she joined Paris Diderot University, from which she retired in 1986.

== Research ==
Libermann's research involved many different aspects of differential geometry and global analysis. In particular, she worked on G-structures and Cartan's equivalence method, Lie groupoids and Lie pseudogroups, higher-order connections, and contact geometry.

After her appointment as a full professor in Paris. Libermann continued her work as an influential researcher, developing the work of Cartan and Ehlermann and publishing some 70 papers until her death in 2007.

In 1987, together with Charles-Michel Marle, she wrote one of the first textbooks on symplectic geometry and analytical mechanics.

Libermann travelled widely, speaking at many conferences and visiting universities and research associations, including Oxford University, the University of California at Berkeley, the Mathematical Sciences Research Institute and the National Institute of Pure and Applied Mathematics in Brazil.

== Honors ==
In 2026, Libermann was announced as one of 72 historical women in STEM whose names have been proposed to be added to the 72 men already celebrated on the Eiffel Tower. The plan was announced by the Mayor of Paris, Anne Hidalgo following the recommendations of a committee led by Isabelle Vauglin of Femmes et Sciences and Jean-François Martins, representing the operating company which runs the Eiffel Tower.
