= Picard modular group =

In mathematics, a Picard modular group, studied by Picard (1881), is a group of the form SU(J,L), where L is a 3-dimensional lattice over the ring of integers of an imaginary quadratic field and J is a hermitian form on L of signature (2, 1). Picard modular groups act on the unit sphere in C^{2} and the quotient is called a Picard modular surface.

== See also ==
- Fuchsian group
- Kleinian group
