= Colette Kreder =

French engineer, entrepreneur, feminist (1934–2022)

- Born: Colette Juliette Françoise James; 31 March 1934; Commer, Mayenne
- Died: 14 October 2022 (aged 88); Puteaux
- Occupations: Engineer, entrepreneur, feminist
- Known for: Creation of Demain la Parité network and Femmes et sciences

Colette Kreder, née James (31 March 1934 - 14 October 2022) was a French engineer, entrepreneur and feminist. She was behind the creation of the Demain la Parité network and the Femmes et Sciences organisation. She is one of the 72 women whose names have been proposed for addition to the Eiffel Tower.

== Early life and education ==
Colette Juliette Françoise James was born on 31 March 1934 in Commer, Mayenne, the daughter of a shopkeeper and a blacksmith. Her early education was at the lycée de jeunes filles in Rennes, Ille-et-Vilaine, then at the Ambroise-Paré high school in Laval. James attended the École Polytechnique Féminine (EPF) from 1954 after passing the entrance examination. She graduated as an engineer in 1957.

== Personal life ==
In 1957, Collette James married Jean-Claude Kreder and took his surname. The couple had three daughters.

== Career ==
Following graduation, Kreder was recruited by the ministère de l'Air (Défense) (the Ministry of Air Defence) where she was responsible for advanced research on electronic components until 1964. In 1964, she joined the company Lignes télégraphiques et téléphoniques (LTT). Whilst remaining a consulting engineer at LTT until 1979, Kreder also set up her own company, Soredi, becoming an early female entrepreneur in the field.

In 1980, Kreder took over as director of her alma mater, the École Polytechnique Féminine (EPF), a position she held until 1994. She transformed the college, bringing it up to international standards. She oversaw the transition to a five-year programme in 1984 and the creation of an international department in 1986. In 1991 the EPF Foundation was created and recognised as a public utility. She put in train the first dual degree programme with Germany in 1993, and the transition to co-education in 1994.

== Feminist activism ==
In the late 1980s, Kreder joined the Conseil national des femmes françaises (National Council of French Women) (CNFF) and became its treasurer. In December 1992, she co-organised an information meeting on gender parity for women's and feminist organisations at the National Assembly with MP and sociologist Françoise Gaspard. More than forty-five organisations attended the meeting.

With Gaspard and journalist Claude Servan-Schreiber, Kreder founded the Action pour la parité (Action for Parity) organisation in 1992. She organised a meeting at the l'Assemblée nationale to publicise the charter adopted at the European ‘Women and Power’ congress held in Athens, which included the requirement for gender parity in decision-making bodies. In 1993, with Gaspard and Servan-Schreiber, Kreder published the first study on French women's presence in 1993 French legislative election. Their work highlighted the low rate of female candidates in the first round of the legislative elections (19.6%), with even fewer represented within the governing parties. 5.6% of MPs were women, placing France second to last in Europe in terms of female representation in politics. At the time, only Greece had lower levels of female political representation. This information became headline news and sparked the mobilisation of feminist associations to campaign to improve the situation.

In 1994, the informal network Demain la Parité evolved from this work and grew to include organisations such as the Association française des femmes diplômées des universités (French Association of University Women), Elles aussi, l'Action catholique générale féminine (the General Catholic Women's Action), Parité-Infos, the Guides de France, the Union féminine civique et sociale (Civic and Social Women's Union), the Union professionnelle féminine (Professional Women's Union), and the European Council of the Women's International Zionist Organization. The aim of the Demain la Parité network is to promote gender parity in politics and science.

On 7 April 1995, Kreder organised a symposium ‘Présidentielle: les femmes entrent en campagne’ to challenge presidential candidates Jacques Chirac, Édouard Balladur and Lionel Jospin on the constitutional and legislative changes needed to enable better representation of women in politics. Around 1,600 representatives of women's associations and 70 journalists from around the world listened to the three male political candidates answer questions from feminist activists.

In 2000, Kreder founded the organisation Femmes et Sciences (Women and Science) in conjunction with Huguette Delavault, Françoise Cyrot-Lackmann, Claudine Hermann and Françoise Gaspard. Their aim was to promote the appeal of Science, technology, engineering, and mathematical fields to women and girls, encourage women's careers in and increase their visibility these fields. The same year, she published statistics on women promoted to the national orders of the Legion of Honour and Ordre national du Mérite and reminded Nicolas Sarkozy of his commitment to support better representation of women during his own election campaign. Gender parity in awards in both these French national orders and in French elected governments has since increased, following the passing of the Law of 6 June 2000 (France).

Collette Kreder died on 20 October 2022 at Puteaux.

== Archives ==
Colette Kreder's archives are held at the Centre des archives du féminisme (Feminist Archives Centre) at the University of Angers.

== Honours and awards ==
Colette Kreder was appointed Knight of the Legion of Honour and later promoted to Officer of the Order on 5 November 2001. She was later promoted to Commander of the Order on 31 December 2009 as a "founding member of organisations supporting women".

Kreder was appointed Knight of the Ordre national du Mérite, promoted to Officer rank on 13 September 2000 and then further promoted to Commander of the Order on 15 May 2006 as a ‘former director of the Ecole Polytechnique Féminine and founding member of a network of organisations’.

In 2026, Kreder was announced as one of 72 historical women in STEM whose names have been proposed to be added to the 72 men already celebrated on the Eiffel Tower. The plan was announced by the Mayor of Paris, Anne Hidalgo following the recommendations of a committee led by Isabelle Vauglin of Femmes et Sciences and Jean-François Martins, representing the operating company which runs the Eiffel Tower.
