= 1341 Edmée =

Main-belt asteroid

Discovery
- Discovered by: E. Delporte
- Discovery site: Uccle Obs.
- Discovery date: 27 January 1935

Designations
- Named after: Édmée Chandon (French astronomer)
- Alternative designations: 1935 BA · 1929 WB_{1} 1932 NK · 1957 YK; 1963 KJ · A917 DA
- Minor planet category: main-belt · (middle)

Orbital characteristics
- Epoch 4 September 2017 (JD 2458000.5)
- Uncertainty parameter 0
- Observation arc: 100.28 yr (36,626 days)
- Aphelion: 2.9612 AU
- Perihelion: 2.5227 AU
- Semi-major axis: 2.7420 AU
- Eccentricity: 0.0799
- Orbital period (sidereal): 4.54 yr (1,658 days)
- Mean anomaly: 298.49°
- Mean motion: 0° 13^{m} 1.56^{s} / day
- Inclination: 13.084°
- Longitude of ascending node: 107.54°
- Argument of perihelion: 141.11°

Physical characteristics
- Dimensions: 23.859±0.556 km 26.79±8.56 km 27.14±0.73 km 27.49±1.1 km (IRAS:17)
- Synodic rotation period: 5.9476±0.0011 h 11.89±0.01 h 23.745±0.005 h 23.75±0.01 h
- Geometric albedo: 0.1371±0.011 (IRAS:17); 0.144±0.009; 0.16±0.06; 0.182±0.028
- Spectral type: Tholen = XB · XB; B–V = 0.700; U–B = 0.262
- Absolute magnitude (H): 10.14±0.41 · 10.320±0.001 (R) · 10.58

1341 Edmée, provisional designation 1935 BA, is a rare-type metallic asteroid from the central region of the asteroid belt, approximately 27 kilometers in diameter.

It was discovered on 27 January 1935, by Belgian astronomer Eugène Joseph Delporte at Uccle Observatory in Belgium, and later named after French astronomer Édmée Chandon.

== Orbit and classification ==
Edmée orbits the Sun in the middle main-belt at a distance of 2.5–3.0 AU once every 4 years and 6 months (1,658 days). Its orbit has an eccentricity of 0.08 and an inclination of 13° with respect to the ecliptic. In 1917 it was first identified as A917 DA at Heidelberg Observatory. The body's observation arc begins at Uccle, on the night following its official discovery observation in 1935.

== Physical characteristics ==
Edmée is classified as a rare XB-type in the Tholen taxonomy, an intermediary between the X and B type asteroids.

=== Rotation period ===
American astronomer Robert Stephens obtained several rotational lightcurves of Edmée between 2004 and 2014. Best rated results include an observation taken at the Goat Mountain Research Observatory (G79) during the body's 2009-opposition, which gave a rotation period of 23.745 hours with a brightness variation of 0.05 magnitude (U=2+), superseding an alternative period solution of 11.89 (U=2).

Because Edmée's rotation is similar to that of Earth, photometric observations are challenging. (Note: Lightcurve plot of (1341) Edmée from its 2014-observation (Robert Stephens), published by the Center for Solar System Studies (CS3) in Landers, California.) In 2013, a much shorter period was derived from a fragmentary lightcurve at the Palomar Transient Factory in California (U=1).

=== Diameter and albedo ===
According to the surveys carried out by the Infrared Astronomical Satellite IRAS, the Japanese Akari satellite, and NASA's Wide-field Infrared Survey Explorer with its subsequent NEOWISE mission, Edmée measures between 23.86 and 27.49 kilometers in diameter, and its surface has an albedo between 0.137 and 0.182. The Collaborative Asteroid Lightcurve Link adopt the results from IRAS, that is, an albedo of 0.1371 and a diameter of 27.49 kilometers with an absolute magnitude of 10.58.

== Naming ==
This minor planet was named in honour of French astronomer Édmée Chandon. Naming citation was first mentioned in The Names of the Minor Planets by Paul Herget in 1955 (H 122).
