= Picard modular surface =

In mathematics, a Picard modular surface is a complex algebraic surface obtained as an arithmetic quotient of the two-dimensional complex unit ball by a Picard modular group. The construction was studied by Émile Picard in the nineteenth century and provides an important example of an arithmetic quotient of a Hermitian symmetric domain.

Picard modular surfaces are examples of Shimura varieties associated with unitary groups of signature (2,1). They arise naturally in complex hyperbolic geometry, the theory of automorphic forms, and the arithmetic geometry of abelian varieties with complex multiplication.

== Construction ==
=== The complex unit ball ===
Let $\mathbb{C}^{2}$ denote two-dimensional complex Euclidean space. The complex unit ball is defined by

$$\mathbb{B}^{2}
=
\left\{
(z_1,z_2)\in\mathbb{C}^{2}:
|z_1|^{2}+|z_2|^{2}<1
\right\}.$$

This domain is a Hermitian symmetric space of noncompact type and is a model of two-dimensional complex hyperbolic space.

To describe its symmetry group, consider the Hermitian form

$$h(z,w)=z_1\overline{w}_1+
z_2\overline{w}_2-z_3\overline{w}_3$$

on $\mathbb{C}^{3}$.

Its associated Hermitian matrix is

$$J=
\begin{pmatrix}
1&0&0\\
0&1&0\\
0&0&-1
\end{pmatrix}.$$

The corresponding special unitary group is

$$\operatorname{SU}(2,1)
=
\left\{
g\in\operatorname{SL}_3(\mathbb{C}):
g^{*}Jg=J
\right\},$$

where $g^{*}$ denotes the conjugate transpose.

The projective unitary group $\operatorname{PU}(2,1)$ acts by biholomorphic transformations on $\mathbb{B}^{2}$.

=== Derivation of the ball model ===
A point of complex projective space $\mathbb{P}^{2}(\mathbb{C})$ can be represented by a nonzero vector

$$v=(z_1,z_2,z_3).$$

Consider the set of negative complex lines:

$$\mathcal{D}
=
\left\{
[v]\in\mathbb{P}^{2}(\mathbb{C}):
h(v,v)<0
\right\}.$$

Since

$$h(v,v)=|z_1|^2+|z_2|^2-|z_3|^2,$$

the inequality $h(v,v)<0$ implies that $z_3\neq 0$.

Every negative line therefore has a unique representative of the form

$$(z_1,z_2,1).$$

The negativity condition becomes

$$|z_1|^2+|z_2|^2<1.$$

Consequently,

$$\mathcal{D}\cong\mathbb{B}^{2}.$$

This identifies the complex unit ball with the space of negative lines for a Hermitian form of signature (2,1).

== Picard modular groups ==
Let $K$ be an imaginary quadratic number field, and let $\mathcal{O}_K$ denote its ring of integers.

Suppose that $h$ is a nondegenerate Hermitian form on $K^3$ whose extension to $\mathbb{C}^{3}$ has signature (2,1).

The associated integral special unitary group is

$$\operatorname{SU}(h,\mathcal{O}_K)
=
\left\{
g\in\operatorname{SL}_3(\mathcal{O}_K):
g^{*}Hg=H
\right\},$$

where $H$ is a matrix representing the form.

Its image in $\operatorname{PU}(2,1)$ is an arithmetic lattice. Such groups, together with appropriate commensurable arithmetic subgroups, are called Picard modular groups.

A standard example is obtained by taking

$$K=\mathbb{Q}(i),
\qquad
\mathcal{O}_K=\mathbb{Z}[i].$$

For the Hermitian matrix

$$J=
\begin{pmatrix}
1&0&0\\
0&1&0\\
0&0&-1
\end{pmatrix},$$

one obtains the integral group

$$\Gamma=
\operatorname{SU}(J,\mathbb{Z}[i]).$$

Its projective image acts discretely on the complex unit ball.

== Quotient construction ==
Let $\Gamma$ be a Picard modular group acting on $\mathbb{B}^{2}$.

The corresponding Picard modular surface is the quotient

$$X_{\Gamma}
=
\Gamma\backslash\mathbb{B}^{2}.$$

Points of the quotient correspond to orbits under the action of $\Gamma$.

Explicitly, two points $z,w\in\mathbb{B}^{2}$ represent the same point of the quotient precisely when

$$w=\gamma z$$

for some $\gamma\in\Gamma$.

If the projective action of $\Gamma$ is torsion-free, the quotient is a smooth complex surface.

If the group has nontrivial finite stabilizers, the quotient can have finite quotient singularities.

Because the ball has complex dimension two, the quotient also has complex dimension two.

=== Complex dimension ===
The complex unit ball is an open subset of $\mathbb{C}^{2}$, so

$$\dim_{\mathbb{C}}\mathbb{B}^{2}=2.$$

A properly discontinuous action by biholomorphisms preserves the local complex dimension of the quotient.

Therefore,

When the group action is free, the quotient map is a holomorphic covering map and the local complex structures descend to the quotient.

== Complex hyperbolic geometry ==
The complex unit ball carries the Bergman metric, an invariant Kähler metric.

A Kähler potential for a standard normalization of this metric is

$$\Phi(z)
=
-\log(1-|z_1|^2-|z_2|^2).$$

The associated Hermitian metric has coefficients

$$g_{i\bar j}
=
\frac{\partial^2\Phi}
{\partial z_i\partial\overline{z}_j}.$$

Writing

$$r^2=|z_1|^2+|z_2|^2,$$

direct differentiation gives

$$g_{i\bar j}
=
\frac{\delta_{ij}}{1-r^2}
+
\frac{\overline{z}_i z_j}{(1-r^2)^2}.$$

The corresponding Kähler form is

$$\omega
=
i\sum_{i,j=1}^{2}
g_{i\bar j}\,
dz_i\wedge d\overline{z}_j.$$

This metric is invariant under the holomorphic automorphism group of the ball.

Its holomorphic sectional curvature is constant and negative.

With the normalization above, the holomorphic sectional curvature equals $-4$.

Since the action of a Picard modular group is by holomorphic isometries, the metric descends to the smooth part of the quotient.

=== Kähler property ===
A Hermitian metric is Kähler when its associated fundamental two-form is closed.

Because the metric is obtained from a potential,

$$\omega=i\partial\bar\partial\Phi.$$

The identities

$$\partial^2=0,
\qquad
\bar\partial^2=0,
\qquad
\partial\bar\partial
+
\bar\partial\partial=0$$

imply

$$d\omega=0.$$

Thus the complex unit ball is Kähler.

The invariance of the metric under the arithmetic group allows the Kähler form to descend to the quotient. Consequently, every smooth Picard modular surface inherits a Kähler structure.

== Algebraic structure ==
Picard modular surfaces are not merely complex analytic quotients. They also admit natural structures as quasi-projective algebraic varieties.

This follows from the general theory of arithmetic quotients of Hermitian symmetric domains.

In particular, the Baily–Borel theorem establishes that the quotient of a Hermitian symmetric domain by an arithmetic group has a canonical structure as a quasi-projective algebraic variety.

The theorem also constructs a projective compactification, called the Baily–Borel compactification.

For a Picard modular surface, this gives

$$X_{\Gamma}
\hookrightarrow
X_{\Gamma}^{*},$$

where $X_{\Gamma}^{*}$ is projective.

The boundary consists of finitely many cusp points when the quotient is noncompact.

=== Compactification ===
The Baily–Borel compactification is generally singular at its boundary.

For a sufficiently small arithmetic subgroup, one can also construct a smooth toroidal compactification

$$\overline{X}_{\Gamma}.$$

In the noncompact ball quotient case, the boundary of a smooth toroidal compactification consists of elliptic curves.

These compactifications are important in the study of intersection theory, automorphic forms, and the cohomology of arithmetic surfaces.

== Relation to Shimura varieties ==
Picard modular surfaces form a class of Shimura varieties associated with unitary groups.

Let $K/\mathbb{Q}$ be an imaginary quadratic extension, and let $V$ be a three-dimensional vector space over $K$ equipped with a Hermitian form of signature (2,1).

The corresponding rational algebraic unitary group is

$$G=\operatorname{GU}(V,h),$$

where $\operatorname{GU}$ denotes the group of unitary similitudes.

The associated Hermitian symmetric domain has complex dimension two and can be identified with a complex unit ball.

For a suitable compact open subgroup

$$U\subseteq G(\mathbb{A}_f),$$

the complex points of the Shimura variety admit a description in terms of the double quotient

$$\operatorname{Sh}_U(G)(\mathbb{C})
=
G(\mathbb{Q})
\backslash
\left(
\mathcal{D}\times G(\mathbb{A}_f)/U
\right).$$

Here $\mathbb{A}_f$ denotes the ring of finite adeles of $\mathbb{Q}$.

The connected components are arithmetic quotients of the complex unit ball, possibly with additional level structure.

=== Moduli interpretation ===
Picard modular surfaces can also be interpreted as moduli spaces of principally polarized abelian threefolds with an action by the ring of integers of an imaginary quadratic field.

The action on the tangent space is required to satisfy a signature condition of type (2,1).

More precisely, the moduli problem involves triples

$$(A,\iota,\lambda),$$

where

- $A$ is an abelian variety of dimension three;
- $\iota:\mathcal{O}_K\rightarrow\operatorname{End}(A)$ is a ring action;
- $\lambda$ is a compatible polarization.

Suitable determinant, polarization, and level conditions are imposed to obtain the desired unitary Shimura variety.

This interpretation connects Picard modular surfaces with the arithmetic of abelian varieties, complex multiplication, and Galois representations.

== Cohomology ==
The topology and arithmetic of Picard modular surfaces can be studied through singular, de Rham, and étale cohomology.

For a smooth Picard modular surface $X_{\Gamma}$, its singular cohomology groups are denoted by

$$H^k(X_{\Gamma},\mathbb{Q}).$$

Because the surface has complex dimension two, its real dimension is four.

Consequently,

$$H^k(X_{\Gamma},\mathbb{Q})=0
\qquad (k>4).$$

For a smooth compactification, the complex cohomology admits a Hodge decomposition

$$H^k(\overline{X}_{\Gamma},\mathbb{C})
=
\bigoplus_{p+q=k}
H^{p,q}(\overline{X}_{\Gamma}).$$

In degree two, this becomes

$$H^2(\overline{X}_{\Gamma},\mathbb{C})
=
H^{2,0}
\oplus H^{1,1}
\oplus H^{0,2}.$$

The Hodge decomposition provides information about holomorphic differential forms, divisor classes, and the algebraic geometry of the compactification.

For a noncompact Picard modular surface, the ordinary cohomology instead carries a natural mixed Hodge structure.

== Automorphic forms ==
Automorphic forms on Picard modular groups generalize classical modular forms.

They can be described using holomorphic functions on the complex unit ball satisfying transformation laws under the arithmetic group.

Such forms play an important role in the construction of automorphic vector bundles and in the study of the cohomology of Picard modular surfaces.

The associated automorphic representations are related to unitary groups and to arithmetic questions involving special values of L-functions.

== Historical background ==
Picard modular surfaces originated in the nineteenth-century study of automorphic functions of several complex variables.

Émile Picard investigated discrete groups acting on complex domains, extending aspects of the classical theory of modular functions.

Modern approaches interpret these surfaces through complex hyperbolic geometry, arithmetic lattices, and the theory of Shimura varieties.

== See also ==
- Shimura variety
- Complex hyperbolic space
- Hermitian symmetric space
- Arithmetic group
- Modular form
- Unitary group
- Baily–Borel compactification
- Abelian variety
- Hodge theory

== See also ==
- Hilbert modular surface
- Siegel modular variety
