= Picard horn =

Hyperbolic 3-manifold proposed as a model for the shape of the universe

A Picard horn, also called the Picard topology or Picard model, is one of the oldest known hyperbolic 3-manifolds, first described by Émile Picard in 1884. The manifold is the quotient of the upper half-plane model of hyperbolic 3-space by the projective special linear group, $\operatorname{PSL}_2(\mathbf{Z}[i])$. It was proposed as a model for the shape of the universe in 2004. The term "horn" is due to pseudosphere models of hyperbolic space.

== Geometry and topology ==
A modern description, in terms of fundamental domain and identifications, can be found in section 3.2, page 63 of Grunewald and Huntebrinker, along with the first 80 eigenvalues of the Laplacian, tabulated on page 72, where $\Upsilon_1$ is a fundamental domain of the Picard space.

== Cosmology ==
The term was coined in 2004 by Ralf Aurich, Sven Lustig, Frank Steiner, and Holger Then in their paper Hyperbolic Universes with a Horned Topology and the CMB Anisotropy.

The model was chosen in an attempt to describe the microwave background radiation apparent in the universe, and has finite volume and useful spectral characteristics (the first several eigenvalues of the Laplacian are computed and in good accord with observation). In this model one end of the figure curves finitely into the bell of the horn. The curve along any side of horn is considered to be a negative curve. The other end extends to infinity.

== See also ==
- Gabriel's horn
