= Caius Iacob =

Romanian mathematician and politician

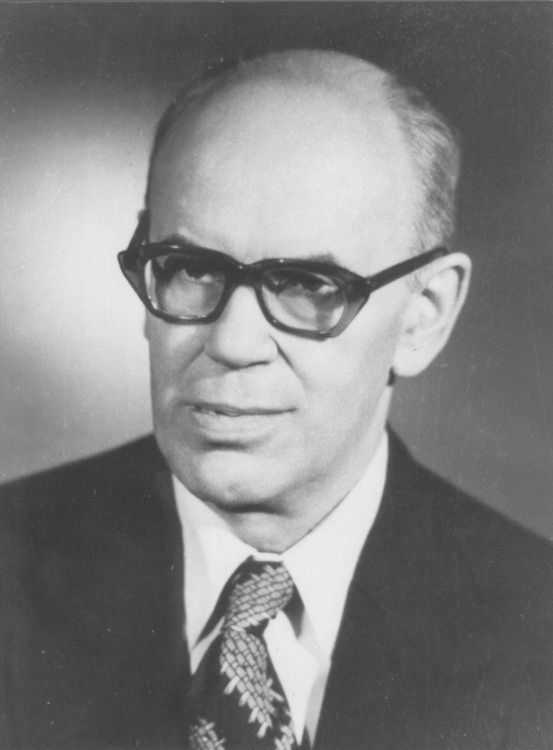
- Born: March 29, 1912; Arad, Austria-Hungary
- Died: February 6, 1992 (aged 79); Bucharest, Romania
- Education: University of Bucharest; University of Paris
- Awards: Henri de Parville Prize; State Prize of the Romanian People's Republic; Order of the Star of the Romanian People's Republic
- Scientific career
- Fields: Mathematics
- Workplaces: Politehnica University of Timișoara; Babeș-Bolyai University; University of Bucharest
- Thesis: Sur la détermination des fonctions harmoniques par certaines conditions aux limites: applications à l'hydrodynamique (1935)
- Doctoral advisor: Henri Villat

Member of the Senate of Romania
- In office 18 June 1990 – 6 February 1992
- Constituency: Bucharest

Caius Iacob (March 29, 1912 – February 6, 1992) was a Romanian mathematician, professor at the University of Bucharest, and titular member of the Romanian Academy. After the fall of communism in 1989, he was elected to the Senate of Romania.

== Biography ==
He was born in Arad, the son of Lazăr Iacob and Camelia, née Moldovan. His father was professor of Canon Law, and served as delegate for Arad at the Great National Assembly of Alba Iulia of 1 December 1918. Caius Iacob attended the Moise Nicoară High School in his native city, and then completed his secondary education at the Emanuil Gojdu High School in Oradea. After passing his baccalaureate examination with the highest mark in the nation, he was admitted in 1928 at the Faculty of Sciences of the University of Bucharest, from where he graduated in 1931, aged nineteen. Iacob continued his studies at the Faculty of Sciences of the University of Paris, with thesis advisor Henri Villat. He defended his thesis, Sur la détermination des fonctions harmoniques par certaines conditions aux limites: applications à l'hydrodynamique, on 24 June 1935.

His most important work was in the studies of classical hydrodynamics, fluid mechanics, mathematical analysis, and compressible-flow theory.

Iacob started his academic career in 1935 at Politehnica University of Timișoara, after which he became a professor at the University of Bucharest and at Babeș-Bolyai University in Cluj. In 1955, he was elected a corresponding member of the Romanian Academy, becoming a titular member in 1963. From 1980 to the end of his life he served as President of the Mathematics section of the Romanian Academy.

He was awarded several prizes for his work: the Henri de Parville Prize by the French Academy of Sciences (1940), the State Prize of the Romanian People's Republic (1952), and the Order of the Star of the Romanian People's Republic, 3rd class (1964).

In May 1990, he was elected senator for the Christian Democratic National Peasants' Party — the only member of the party to be elected to the upper chamber of the Parliament of Romania that year. He died in Bucharest in February 1992.

== Legacy ==
Iacob was one of the founders of the Institute of Applied Mathematics of the Romanian Academy in 1991. Ten years later, the institute merged with the Center for Mathematical Statistics of the academy (that had been founded by Gheorghe Mihoc in 1964), becoming the current Gheorghe Mihoc–Caius Iacob Institute of Mathematical Statistics and Applied Mathematics of the Romanian Academy.

A high school and a middle school, as well as a street and a plaza in Arad also bear his name.
