= Claudine Hermann =

French physicist and academic (1945–2021)

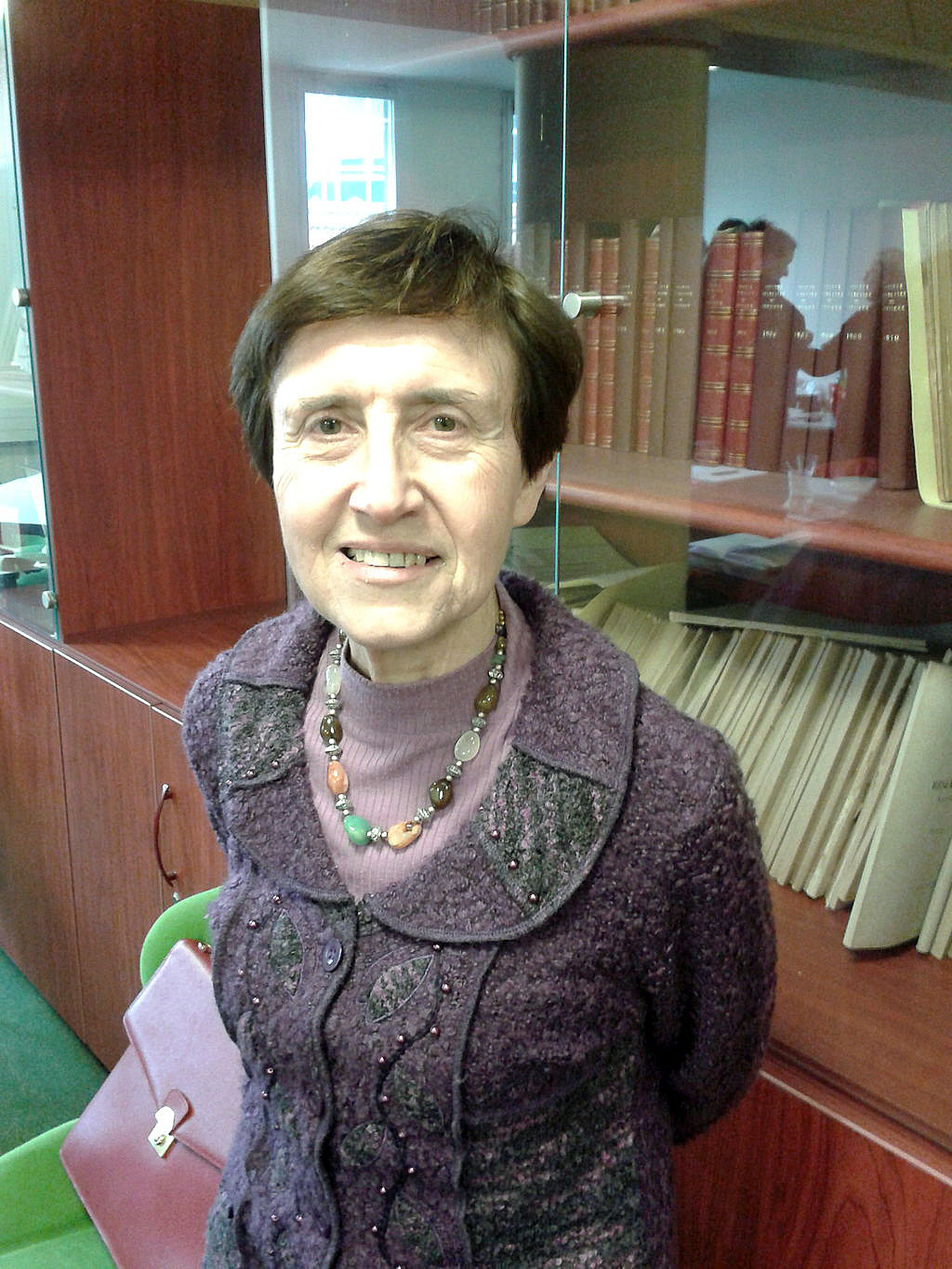
- Hermann in 2013
- Born: Claudine Rodrigues; December 19, 1945
- Died: July 17, 2021 (aged 75)
- Education: École normale supérieure de jeunes filles
- Scientific career
- Fields: Solid state physics
- Workplaces: École Polytechnique
- Thesis: Pompage optique dans l'antimoniure de gallium : détection optique de la résonance électronique (1976)

Claudine Hermann (née Rodrigues, 19 December 1945 – 17 July 2021) was a French physicist and honorary professor at École Polytechnique, the grande école founded in 1794 and located in Palaiseau, France. In 1992 she became the first woman to serve there as a professor. As a researcher, she has specialized in solid-state physics. She has also served as president of the European Platform of Women Scientists and in 2000 was one of several women who founded Femmes et Sciences. In early 2025, that organization proposed 72 names of women in science to be added to the sides of the Eiffel Tower, including Hermann herself.

== Biography ==
=== Early life and education ===
Claudine Rodrigues was the daughter of a pharmacist. She studied at the École normale supérieure de jeunes filles and graduated in 1965. In 1969, she passed the competitive agrégation examination in physics. The same year she married Jean-Paul Hermann whose career was similar to her own. By 1980, they had three children together.

She completed her doctoral studies at Paris Diderot University in 1976, with a thesis titled "Pompage optique dans l'antimoniure de gallium : détection optique de la résonance électronique" (Optical pumping in gallium antimonide: optical detection of electron resonance). In 1977 she published the obtained value of the Landé g-factor g=-0.44 for electrons in gallium arsenide, which is important for spin physics in the quantum Hall regime.

=== Research and career ===
Hermann was appointed a lecturer at École Polytechnique in 1980. She taught classes in semiconductor physics. She worked on the optical properties of solids, in particular the photo-emission of polarised electrons. She developed techniques to optically measure the spin resonance in semiconductors. She demonstrated the hole effective mass (0.051) of indium gallium arsenide in 1981.

Hermann was the first woman to be appointed Professor at the École Polytechnique in 1992. She spent a year as a visiting researcher at Nagoya University in Japan in 1998.

=== Activism ===
Thanks to her connection with Huguette Delavault, she developed a strong interest in women scientists in France. She was startled to find that at the École Polytechnique, only 15% of the students were women. This observation led her to attend conferences and write papers on promoting the role of women in the area of science.

In the year 2000, together with Françoise Cyrot-Lackmann, Huguette Delavault, Françoise Gaspard, Colette Kreder and the Femmes et Mathématiques association, Hermann was behind the creation of Femmes et Sciences, an organization designed to encourage girls and women to participate in science. In early 2025, it proposed that the names of 72 women in science should be added to the Eiffel Tower.

Alongside her research into condensed matter, Hermann worked to make the environment better for women physicists. In 1999 she was appointed to the European Union Helsinki Group on women and science, and remained a member until 2006. She co-founded the platform Femmes et Sciences with Huguette Delavault in 2000. She was a member of the expert group who produced the European Technology Assessment Network (ETAN) report on women in academia - Science Policies in the European Union: promoting excellence through mainstreaming gender equality - for the European Union in 2000.

Hermann was President of the European Platform of Women Scientists from 2017-2021, and was elected also the President of Honour of the EPWS in 2021, shortly before her death.

=== Death ===
Claudine Hermann, aged 76, passed away on 17 July 2021, in a struggle against cancer.

== Honours and awards ==
- 2015 Grand Officer of the Legion of Honour
- 2010 Grand Officer of the National Order of Merit

On 8 March 2024, Université Sorbonne Paris Nord in Villetaneuse renamed one of its lecture theatres the “Claudine-Hermann Lecture Theatre” in Hermann's memory. The same year a secondary school in Massy was named after her.

In 2026, Hermann was announced as one of 72 historical women in STEM whose names have been proposed to be added to the 72 men already celebrated on the Eiffel Tower. The plan was announced by the Mayor of Paris, Anne Hidalgo following the recommendations of a committee led by Isabelle Vauglin of Femmes et sciences and Jean-François Martins, representing the operating company which runs the Eiffel Tower.

== Books ==
- 2010 Statistical Physics: Including Applications to Condensed Matter
- 2003 Physics of Semiconductors
