= Colette Guillopé =

French mathematician (born 1951)

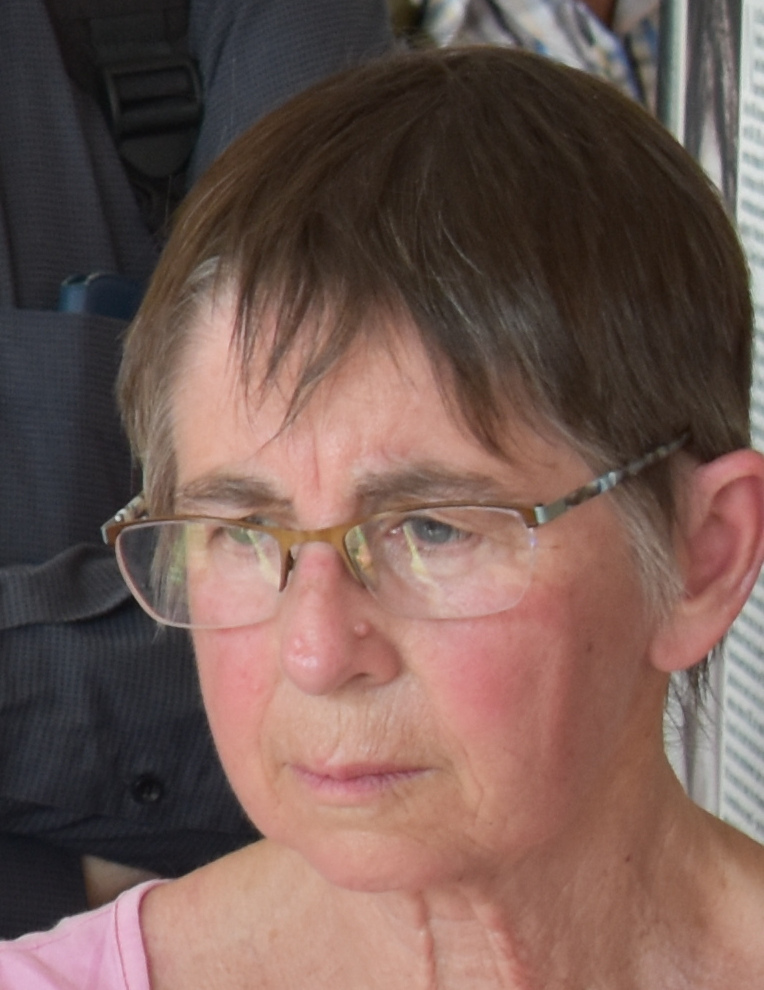
Colette Guillopé

Colette Guillopé (born 1951) is a French mathematician specializing in partial differential equations and fluid mechanics. She is a professor emerita at Paris 12 Val de Marne University, where she is also the gender officer for the university.

== Early life ==
Guillopé's parents were both professors. She studied at the École normale supérieure de Fontenay-aux-Roses.

== Education ==
Guillopé earned a diplôme d'études approfondies. In 1977, Guillopé earned her doctorate at the Centre national de la recherche scientifique. She completed a thèse d'état in 1983 from the University of Paris-Sud under the supervision of Roger Temam.

== Career ==
Guillopé was a founding member of L'association femmes et mathématiques in 1987, and was its president from 1996 to 1998. She also led the association Femmes et Sciences from 2004 to 2008. In 2016 she became an officer in the Legion of Honour, being promoted from the rank of a knight in the Legion.

She was president of French women mathematicians.
