= Paul Dubreil =

French mathematician (1904–1994)

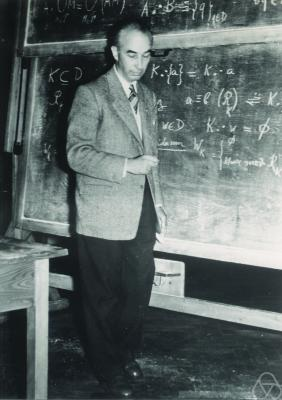
- Paul Dubreil in 1954; Photo courtesy of MFO
- Born: 1 March 1904; Le Mans, France
- Died: 9 March 1994 (aged 90); Soisy-sur-École, France
- Education: University of Paris
- Spouse: Marie-Louise Dubreil-Jacotin
- Awards: Cours Peccot (1933); Prix Francoeur (1942); Grand prix des sciences mathématiques (1952)
- Scientific career
- Fields: Mathematics
- Workplaces: University of Paris
- Doctoral advisor: Charles Émile Picard
- Doctoral students: Dov Tamari

Paul Dubreil (French: [dybʁɛj]; 1 March 1904 – 9 March 1994) was a French mathematician.

He was born in Le Mans, Maine, France and died in Soisy-sur-École, France. Dubreil was married to fellow mathematician Marie-Louise Dubreil-Jacotin.

== Selected publications ==
=== Articles ===
- "Contribution à la théorie des demi-groupes". Mémoires de l'Académie des Sciences. 63 (3): 1–52. 1941.
- "Emmy Noether". Cahiers du séminaire d'histoire des mathématiques. 7: 15–27. 1986.

=== Books ===
- Algèbre. Gauthier-Villars. 1946. (preface by Gaston Julia)
- Algèbre et théorie des nombres. Paris: Faculté de Sciences. 1956.
- with M.L. Dubreil-Jacotin: Leçons d'algèbre moderne. Dunod. 1961.
  - Lectures on Modern Algebra. Edinburgh: Oliver and Boyd. 1967. (English translation)
  - Lecciones de álgebra moderna. Reverté. 1971. ISBN 9788429150704. (Spanish translation by R. Rodriguez Vidal)
- Théorie des groupes; cours d'initiation. Paris: Dunod. 1972.
