= Françoise Gaspard =

French politician and sociologist (born 1945)

Françoise Gaspard, born 1945, is a French sociologist, author and politician. She has been the socialist mayor of her hometown of Dreux, a member of parliament for Eure-et-Loir, a member of the European parliament, and a councillor for the region of Centre-Val de Loire. She is a Commander of the French Order of the Legion of Honour. She is known for her promotion of equal rights for homosexuals and for the participation of women and girls in STEM subjects.

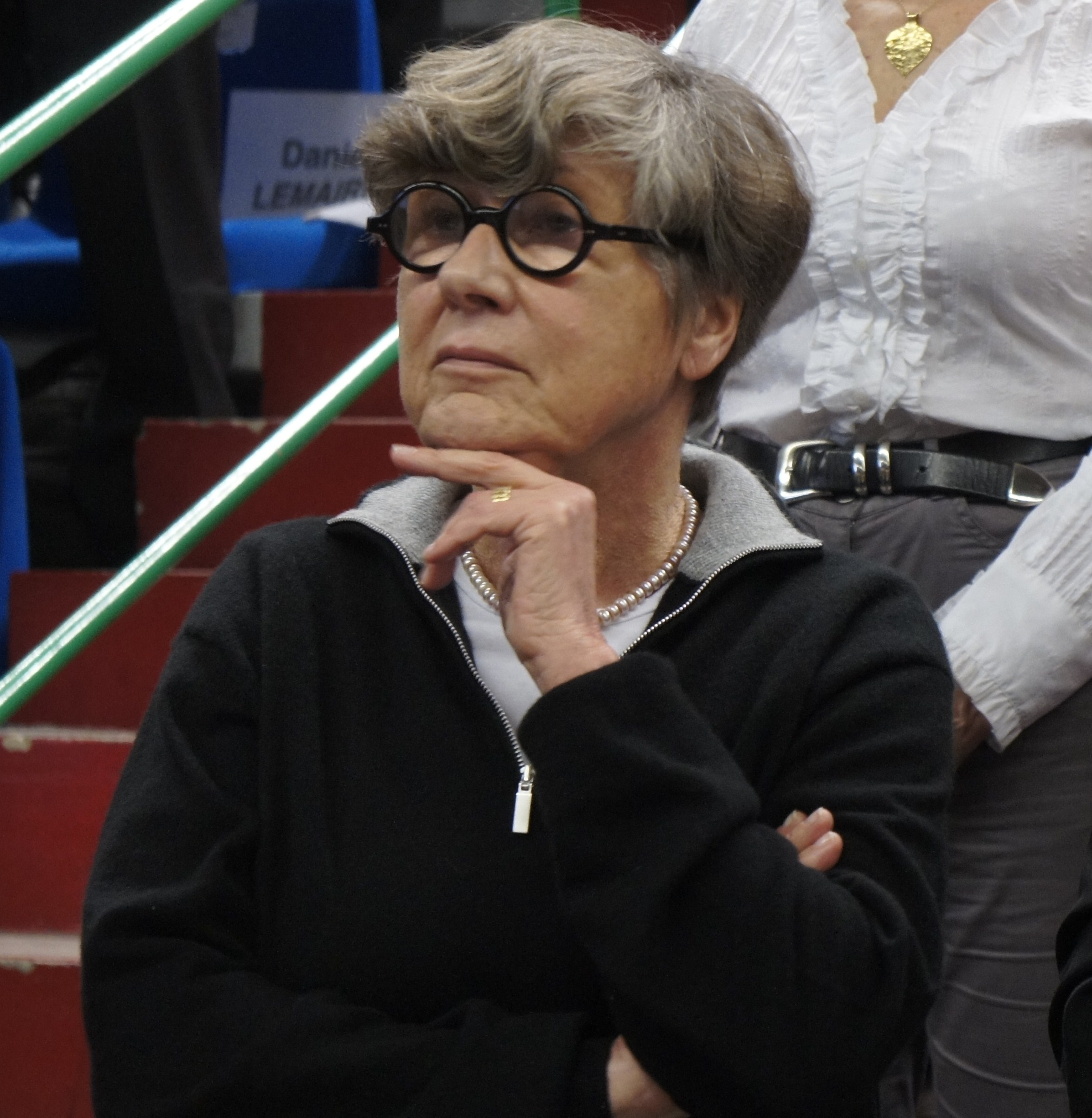
Françoise Gaspard

== Early life and education ==
Gaspard was born on June 7, 1945, in Dreux into a radical family, her grandfather and father being socialists and an uncle a member of the French Communist Party. Her mother was Paule Aubé. Her father Jean Gaspard was a marble worker. Gaspard holds degrees in history, political science and public law as well as being a graduate of the Ecole Nationale d’Administration. She gained a degree in history from the Paris Institute of Political Studies.

== Career ==
She became a technical assistant to Rene Remand at Paris Nanterre University in 1968. Gaspard was a history teaching assistant at Paris-IV University. From 1970 to 1974, she lectured at the Sorbonne and at the Lycée Michelet in Vanves. 1979-81 Gaspard was a member of the European parliament. She worked in parliamentary and local government for twelve years before returning to research. She is affiliated with the Center for Sociological Analysis and Intervention, (Centre d’analyse et d’intervention sociologiques or CADIS), a joint research unit under the joint supervision of the EHESS and the National Center for Scientific Research (CNRS). In January 1998, she was named Representative of France to the UN Commission on the Status of Women. As well as being an expert on the CEDAW Committee from 2001 to 2008, Gaspard was also the vice-chair of this Committee in 2007 and 2008.

== Activism ==
Gaspard has pioneered the introduction of gay and lesbian studies in France. From 1998 to 2004, she led a research seminar on the sociology of homosexualities at the EHSS with Didier Eribon. In March, 1977, Gaspard was elected socialist mayor of Dreux. In 1981, she sat in the National Assembly, elected deputy for Eure-et-Loir. She lost her seat in Drex in 1983. She later wrote a book about the experience, titled Une petite ville en France. In 1991, she was appointed the French expert for the "Women in Decision-Making" network set up by the European Commission. In 1992, Gaspard, with Claude Servan-Schreiber and Anne Le Gall, published *Au pouvoir citoyennes!* (Citizens in Power! ). She has been a member of the National Consultative Commission on Human Rights. In 2000, Gaspard founded Femmes et Sciences (Women and Science) with Huguette Delavault, Françoise Cyrot-Lackmann, Claudine Hermann, Colette Kreder and the association Femmes et Mathématiques (Women and Mathematics), with the objective of promoting the participation of women and girls in STEM subjects.In early 2025, Femmes et Sciences proposed that the names of 72 women in science should be added to the List of names on the Eiffel Tower.

== Personal life ==
Gaspard publicly stated her homosexuality in the 1980s.

== Awards ==
On October 8, 1998, Gaspard was appointed to the rank of Knight in the National Order of the Legion of Honour. She was promoted to the rank of officer on December 31, 2008, and promoted to the rank of commander on April 3, 2015.

== Publications ==
- Madame Le..., Paris, Grasset, 1979 ISBN 978-2-246-00784-5.
- The End of Immigrants, with Claude Servan-Schreiber, Paris, Le Seuil, 1984 (translated into Japanese, Nobuhiro Hayashi, 1989). ISBN 978-2-02-006758-4
- Maurice Viollette, 1870–1960 from Dreux to Algiers ( pref.François Mitterrand), Paris, L'Harmattan, coll. " History and Mediterranean Perspectives",1991, 207 p. ISBN 978-2-7384-0963-8
- A small town in France, Paris, Gallimard, 1990 (translated into English, Harvard University Press, 1995). ISBN 978-0-674-81096-9
- Women in power! Liberty, Equality, Parity, with Claude Servan-Schreiber and Anne Le Gall, Paris, Le Seuil, 1992. ISBN 978-2-02-017360-5
- The Headscarf and the Republic, with Farhad Khosrokhavar, Paris, Éditions de La Découverte, 1995. ISBN 978-2-7071-2428-9
- UFJT, From a working-class youth to an uncertain youth, Forty years of history of an associative movement, 1955-1995, Paris, Les Éditions de l'Atelier, 1995. ISBN 978-2-7082-3110-8
- Women in decision-making in France and Europe (ed.), Paris, L'Harmattan, 1997. ISBN 978-2-7384-4969-6
- How Women Change Politics, with Philippe Bataille, Paris, Éditions de La Découverte, 1999 (translated into Spanish and Arabic). ISBN 978-2-7071-3085-3
- The Black Book of the Condition of Women, 2006. ISBN 978-2-7578-0246-5
