= Huguette Delavault =

French mathematician (1924–2003)

- Born: 15 January 1924; Andilly, Charente-Maritime
- Died: 3 April 2003 (aged 79); 13th arrondissement of Paris
- Education: École normale d'instituteurs in La Rochelle, France; University of Paris
- Known for: co-founded Femmes et Sciences
- Scientific career
- Fields: Mathematical physics
- Institutions: École nationale supérieure d'ingénieurs de Caen
- Thesis: Application de la transformation de Laplace et de la transformation de Hankel à la détermination de solutions de l'équation de la chaleur et des équations de Maxwell en coordonnées cylindriques (1957)
- Doctoral advisor: Henri Villat

Huguette Delavault (15 January 1924 – 2 April 2003) was a French mathematician, specialising in mathematical physics. She co-founded Femmes et Sciences.

== Early life and education ==
Hugette Delavault was born on 15 January 1924, in Andilly, Charente-Maritime. Her parents were both teachers. She studied at a school for teachers, the École normale d'instituteurs in La Rochelle, France, from 1940 to 1943, and then became a student at the École normale supérieure de Fontenay-aux-Roses from 1946 to 1949. After interrupting her studies for health reasons, in 1952 she passed her agrégation in mathematics.

== Career ==
Delavault became a researcher at the French National Centre for Scientific Research (CNRS) from 1952 to 1958, while earning a doctorate in mathematics in 1957 from the University of Paris under the supervision of Henri Villat; her dissertation applied the Laplace transform and Hankel transform to the heat equation and Maxwell's equations, using cylindrical coordinates.

She became a researcher at the University of Rennes in 1958, was promoted to professor in 1962. The university's mathematics department was unusual in 1960 because it had a relatively high percentage of women. There were fifteen professors and three of them were women. Delavault was one of them and the other two were Marie Charpentier and Paulette Libermann. Charpentier taught mechanics and Libermann was known for differential geometry.

In 1970, Delavault became a professor at the École nationale supérieure d'ingénieurs de Caen. She retired in 1984.

Delavault died on 2 April 2003.

== Activism and service ==
From 1976 onward Delavault was a prominent activist for feminist causes, including popularising science and mathematics among women and providing equal opportunities for them both in the academy and in the public sector.

She served as deputy director of the École normale supérieure de Fontenay-aux-Roses from 1976 to 1980, and was twice president of l'Association française des femmes diplômées des universités (the French association for university women).

Delavault co-founded Femmes et Sciences with Françoise Cyrot-Lackmann, Claudine Hermann, Françoise Gaspard and Colette Kreder in 2000.

== Awards and honours ==
Delavault became an officer in the Order of Academic Palms in 1967. In 1971 she became a chevalier (knight) in the French National Order of Merit, and in 1995 a chevalier in the Legion of Honour.

There is a walkway on the University of Toulouse's campus which is named in her honour her.
