= Dubreil-Jacotin–Long equation =

Non-linear equation in fluid dynamics

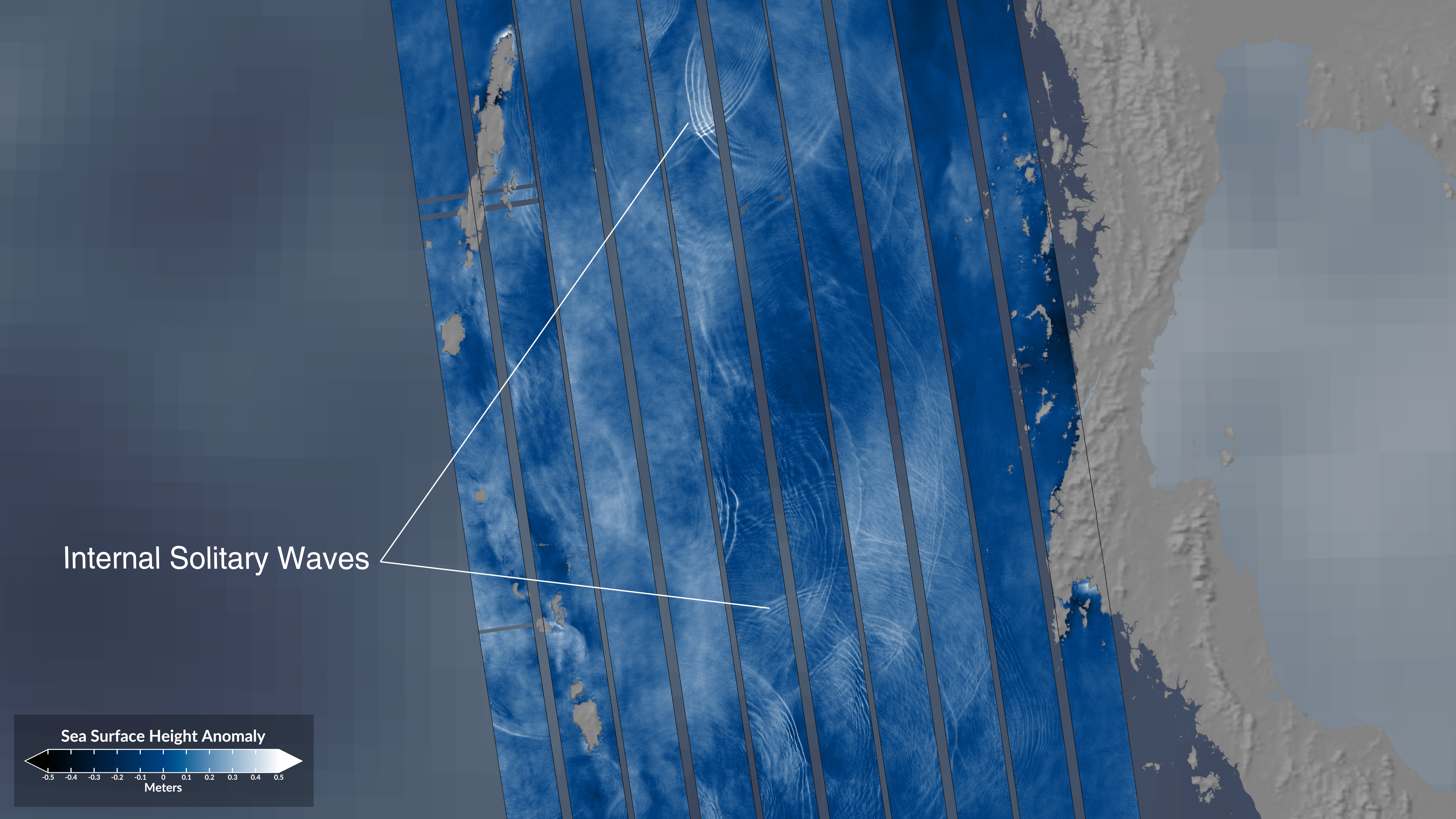
Satellite view of internal solitary waves in the Andaman Sea off the coast of Thailand. Dubreil-Jacotin–Long equation describes their motion.

In fluid mechanics, the Dubreil-Jacotin–Long (DJL) equation is one of the main nonlinear partial differential equation used to describe gravity waves (waves in water). This equation is equivalent to Euler equations of fluid dynamics for stratified media. It describes the motion of internal waves as solitons.

The equation was first proposed by Marie-Louise Dubreil-Jacotin in 1932 and was popularized by Robert R. Long in 1953.

== Description ==
The DJL equation assumes a two-dimensional inviscid, incompressible, irrotational flow under the action of surface gravity described under Boussinesq approximation. The simplest DJL equation for a fixed frame without background flow is given by
$$\nabla^2 \eta +\frac{N(z-\eta)}{c^2}\eta = 0,$$
where $c$ is the unknown wave propagation speed, $z$ is the vertical coordinate, and $\eta(x,z)$ denotes the vertical (isopycnal) displacement, where $x$ is the horizontal coordinate and $N^2$ is the Brunt–Väisälä frequency (buoyancy frequency), given by
$$N^2(z)=-g\frac{\mathrm d \bar{\rho}(z)}{\mathrm d z},$$
where $g$ is the gravitational acceleration and $\bar\rho(z)$ is the average density. Boundary conditions are such that $\eta(x,0)=\eta(x,-H)=0$ and $\eta(|x|\to \infty)\to 0$, where $H$ is the total water depth.

Solving the DJL equation allows to obtain $\eta(x,z)$ and $c$. The DJL equation is a nonlinear elliptic partial differential equation. It is an eigenvalue problem where $c$ is the eigenvalue for the solution $\eta(x,z)$.

DJL equation is useful for the description of internal solitary waves. The DJL equation describes waves of permanent form and cannot describe their formation. Rigid-lid approximation is necessary to avoid coexisting small-amplitude waves with the same $c$ which carry energy into or away. For their formation, the Korteweg–De Vries equation is often used.

By using the relation $\varphi=\eta c$ one can derive the flow velocity field, where $\varphi$ is the stream function.

== Equation with background flow ==
If a steady background current of speed $U(x,z)$ is present, the full DJL equation becomes
$$\nabla^2 \eta - \frac{U'(z-\eta)}{U(z-\eta)-c}[\eta_x^2+(\eta_z-2)\eta_z] +\frac{N(z-\eta)}{(U(z-\eta)-c)^2}\eta = 0,$$
where $\eta_x,\eta_z$ are the horizontal and vertical derivatives of $\eta$.
