= Lycée Jules-Ferry (Paris) =

School in Paris, France

Coordinates: 48°53′03″N 2°19′48″E

Lycée-collège Jules-Ferry
- 77 Bd de Clichy; 75009 Paris, France

Information
- Type: Public high school
- Established: October 26, 1913
- School district: Academy of Paris (Northern district)
- Principal: Mrs Annick Fourno
- Enrollment: ~1,600 students
- Colors: Brown and gold
- Website: http://lyc-jules-ferry.scola.ac-paris.fr/

The Lycée Jules-Ferry is a public secondary and higher education school located in the 9th arrondissement of Paris. It is famous especially since it was used in Diane Kurys's film, Peppermint Soda (Diabolo menthe, 1977).

This public school in Paris is composed by a collège, a lycée and by CPGE.

Anne Amieux was the founding Principal, serving from 1913–1919. Anna Cartan taught mathematics at the school.

Since its creation, this high school had a tradition with literary studies. There are literary and humanities Classes préparatoires aux grandes écoles, for students that are preparing the national exams that lead to the École Normale Supérieure de Lyon academy.

== Notable alumni ==
- Marie-Louise Dubreil-Jacotin (1905-1972), French mathematician
- Alexis Michalik (born 1982), actor, writer and director
