= European Platform of Women Scientists =

Organization

- European Platform of Women Scientists logo
- Abbreviation: EPWS
- Legal status: Non-profit organization
- Purpose: Umberella network of women scientists and organisations committed to gender equality in research in all disciplines.
- Headquarters: Brussels, Belgium
- Brigitte Mühlenbruch: President
- Claudine Hermann: Vice-President

The European Platform of Women Scientists (EPWS) is an umbrella organisation bringing together networks of women scientists and organisations committed to gender equality in research in all disciplines in Europe and the countries associated to the European Union's Framework Programmes for Research and Technological Development. The EPWS offers membership to researchers working in any discipline and working in science in its widest sense, ranging from natural to social sciences, including, but not restricted to, science, engineering and technology. EPWS has over 100 member organisations, working together for more than 12,000 women researchers all over Europe active in academia and in industrial research.

== Purpose ==
Legally established as an international non-profit organisation under Belgian law (AISBL) in November 2005 and governed by an international, multidisciplinary Board of Administration of 11 high ranking women scientists, EPWS constitutes a new strategic instrument in European research policy, complementing various initiatives taken at the European level to ensure a better participation of women scientists in research and in the research policy process as well as the inclusion of the gender dimension in research.

== Goals ==
The platform's main goals are to:

- Network existing networks of women scientists and networks engaged in promoting women scientists in all disciplines and promote networking among women scientists, particularly in Central and Eastern Europe and in the private sector.
- Increase the participation of women scientists in European research and its decision-making bodies – as project researchers, leaders, and coordinators, in review and evaluation panels as well as high level expert groups.
- Increase the participation of women scientists in national and European research programmes, especially in the Seventh EU Framework Programme for Research and Technological Development (FP7).
- Promote the understanding and the inclusion of the gender dimension in science and research policy in all scientific fields as well as an inclusive, gender-sensitive notion of excellence and innovation.
