= Laurence Broze =

French mathematician

Laurence Broze (born 1960) is a Belgian applied mathematician specializing in statistics and econometrics and particularly in the theory of rational expectations. She is a professor of applied mathematics at the University of Lille in France. From 2012 to 2018 she was president of l'association femmes et mathématiques, a French association for women in mathematics.

== Education and career ==
Broze was born in Brussels. She went to high school in Charleroi and earned an agrégation in mathematics in 1982 at the Université libre de Bruxelles. She earned her doctorate at the same university in 1986, and completed a habilitation at the University of Lille in 1994. Her doctoral thesis, Réduction, identification et estimation des modèles à anticipations rationnelles, was supervised by Simone Huyberechts.

She became an assistant at the Université libre de Bruxelles in 1985, and moved to Charles de Gaulle University – Lille III in 1989. At Charles de Gaulle University, she also served as vice president of research from 2000 to 2006, and directed the unit for mathematics, computer science, management, and economics (UFR MIME) from 2009 to 2014; since 2015 she has been assistant director of UFR MIME. In 2018, Charles de Gaulle University merged with two others to become the University of Lille. Since 1996 she has also been a part-time visiting professor at Saint-Louis University, Brussels.

== Contributions ==
With A. Szafarz, Broze is the author of The Econometric Analysis of Non-Uniqueness in Rational Expectations Models (Contributions to Economic Analysis, Elsevier, 1991). With Szafarz and C. Gourieroux, she is the author of Reduced Forms of Rational Expectations Models (Fundamentals of Pure and Applied Economics 42, Harwood Academic Publishers, 1990).

== Recognition ==
In 2014, Broze became a knight of the Legion of Honour, and an officer of the Ordre des Palmes Académiques.
