= Édmée Chandon =

French astronomer (1885–1944)

Edmée Chandon
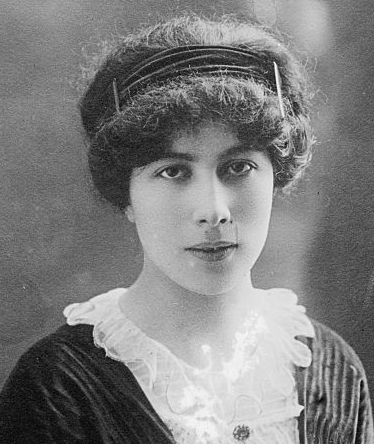
- Edmée Chandon at age 15
- Born: Edmée Marie Juliette Chandon; 21 November 1885; Paris, France
- Died: 8 March 1944 (aged 58); Paris, France
- Scientific career
- Fields: Astronomy
- Workplaces: Paris Observatory
- Thesis: Recherches sur les marées de la mer Rouge et du golfe de Suez (1930)
- Doctoral advisor: Ernest Esclangon

Edmée Marie Juliette Chandon (French: [edme ʃɑ̃dɔ̃]; 21 November 1885 – 8 March 1944) was an astronomer known for being the first professional female astronomer in France. She worked at the Paris Observatory throughout her career.

In 1908, Chandon was placed first in the competitive mathematics agrégation examination. As a result, she was able to benefit from the provisions of the decree of 15 February 1907 in connection with the recruitment of astronomers. With her appointment as aide-astronome (assistant astronomer) at the Paris Observatory on 1 March 1812, she became France's first professional female astronomer. On 1930 she became the first Frenchwoman to earn a Doctorat d'État in mathematical sciences.

== Early life and education ==
The eldest of five children, Chandon was born to Marie Duhan and merchant François Chandon on 21 November 1885 in the 11th arrondissement of Paris. In July 1906, she completed her degree in mathematical sciences at the Faculté des sciences de Paris. She began working at the Paris Observatory in November 1908 as a trainee. She held this unpaid assignment for four years, during which time her skills earned her considerable respect amongst her colleagues and the Observatory’s board, which recommended she be appointed to a paid position.

== Career ==
On 28 February 1912, Chandon was appointed aide astronome et attachée at the Paris Observatory, effective from 1 March, and the appointment made her the first professional female astronomer in France. L'Aurore declared the appointment a "new feminist victory". She was assigned to the time department in 1912, where she was responsible for setting the mean time clock and for telegraphic transmission. Chandon represented the Paris Observatory at the Fête du Soleil, organised by the Société astronomique de France, at the Eiffel Tower on 22 June 1914. At this point, she was only permitted to work during the day, with her male colleagues undertaking night work.

In World War I, Chandon was called up to calculate the trajectories of artillery shells. During this period Chandon was also charged with monitoring the master clock whilst in charge of the meridian telescopes and remained in charge of ensuring its continuity until 1920. She also took on night work in the absence of male colleagues.

In March 1930, Chandon defended her PhD thesis "Research on the tides of the Red Sea and the Gulf of Suez" (French: Recherches sur les marées de la mer Rouge et du golfe de Suez) where she showed that the tides of the Red Sea and Gulf of Suez are examples of standing waves. She was the fourth woman to earn a doctorate at the Sorbonne and the first French woman to defend a State thesis in the field of mathematics.

Chandon was forced to retire on 1 October 1941, due to the Vichy Regime's passing the Law of 11 October 1940, requiring women over the age of 50 to cease work. She was reinstated in 1943 following the Liberation of France.

On 17 May 1943, the French Academy of Sciences proposed four candidates to the Minister of National Education for positions as titular astronomers of Paris Observatory, including Chandon. However she was denied this possibility.

Edmée Chandon was also a science communicator. She gave several conferences as a member of the Société astronomique de France, which she had joined in 1912.

== Personal life ==
Chandon met Jacques Jean Trousset (1885-1943) after he joined her team at the Paris Observatory in January 1909. They married on 6 April 1910 in Saint-Cloud but the marriage was short-lived; the pair divorced on 26 April 1911.

Chandon died at her home in Paris on 8 March 1944.

== Honours and awards ==
Chandon received two awards from the French Academy of Sciences:

- 1930: La Caille Prize - for her PhD thesis
- 1939: d’Aumale Prize for he work in celestial mechanics

The Asteroid 1341 Edmée, discovered in 1935, was named in her honour.

In 2026, Chandon was announced as one of 72 historical women in STEM whose names have been proposed to be added to the 72 men already celebrated on the Eiffel Tower. The plan was announced by the Mayor of Paris, Anne Hidalgo following the recommendations of a committee led by Isabelle Vauglin of Femmes et Sciences and Jean-François Martins, representing the operating company which runs the Eiffel Tower.

== Publications ==
- Observations faites à l'astrolabe à prisme de MM. Claude et Driencourt
- Mesures d'Etoiles doubles faites à l'Equatorial de la Tour de l'Ouest (0m,305 d'ouvert.) de l'Observatoire de Paris par Mme E. CHANDON, en 1920 et 1921
- Sur la variation de la latitude de l'Observatoire de Paris
- Recherches dur les marées de la mer rouge et du Golf de Suez
- Recherches sur la précision des observations en déclinaison faites au cercle du jardin de l'Observatoire de Paris
- Théorie des marées : profondeur moyenne d'un canal calculée au moyen des constantes harmoniques de deux stations
- Les instruments pour l'observation des hauteurs égales en astronomie: (méthode de Gauss généralisée)
- Notice sur les titres et travaux scientifiques de Mme Edmée Chandon
