= Association française des femmes diplômées des universités =

French association of academic women

- Established: 1920
- Location: France

Association française des femmes diplômées des universités (AFFDU) is a recognized association, which was created in 1920. This French section of the International Federation of Academic Women (IFUW), is an NGO. Moreover, AFFDU has a consultative status with the United Nations. The affiliation of AFFDU to the European Women's Group and the UWE Group (University Women of Europe), in the Council of Europe gives to it an international status. Marie-José Jonczy, a lawyer, is the current president of AFFDU and she has directed the activities of this association.

== Foundation ==
The AFFDU was founded in France after the First World War, notably thanks to scientist Marie Curie and historian Jeanne Chaton. The association brings together women graduates who want to defend equality, as well as access to education for women in all fields. Its objective is to defend equal access to education for female graduates. The association's actions seek to promote all female graduates or students in higher education by enabling them to access scholarships or financial aid.

== Missions ==
AFFDU operates within a framework of national and international networks. It is involved in actions aimed at the education of women. It is also involved in the promotion of educated women. The association consists of women graduates of higher education (universities, specialty institutions and engineering schools).

== Distinctions ==
In 2009, the association received the Irène Joliot-Curie Prize for its educational, cultural and mentorship activities.

== Selected activities ==
AFFDU has international activities not only in France but also in Quebec, Canada. The newspaper Le Soleil has published about the activities of this association in Quebec. Another activity of AFFDU is to encourage the acquisition of French by students, which can help them to better succeed in their studies. This association also offers access to contact information. The activities of AFFDU encourage collaboration among women who have graduated from universities.
