= Femmes et Sciences =

Learned society of France

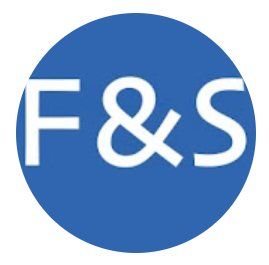
- Formation: 2000; 26 years ago
- Type: National academy
- Headquarters: Paris
- Location: Henri Poincaré Institute
- Region served: France
- Members: 300
- Website: www.femmesetsciences.fr

Femmes et Sciences is a French organisation which encourages young people, especially girls, to engage in scientific and technical training. It promotes women engaged in scientific careers and improves the visibility of women scientists. In 2014, the association received the APEC Gold Trophy from the Association for the employment of executives (French: Association pour l'emploi des cadres) given to associations and public bodies.

One of the organisation's publications inspired the idea of adding women's names to the Eiffel Tower and the organisation chose the 72 women's names that are proposed to join the 72 men's names which Eiffel included.

== History ==
At the end of the 20th century, women scientists and sociologists in France became alarmed by the lack of women undertaking scientific studies, despite their excellent performance in science baccalaureate exams. The work of Huguette Delavault addressed this subject in depth.

In April 1998, the European Commission organised "Women and Science" days, sponsored by the French Prime Minister Édith Cresson, to address representative disparities in science.

In 2000, an interministerial convention to transform gender relations in France emerged in the field of education, developing several initiatives including the Women and Science days.

The Femmes et Sciences association was created at the end of 2000 by Françoise Cyrot-Lackmann, mathematician Huguette Delavault, Françoise Gaspard, physicist Claudine Hermann, engineer Colette Kreder and the Femmes et Mathématiques association. Anthropologist Françoise Héritier, then a professor at the Collège de France, became an honorary member. Françoise Cyrot-Lackmann was appointed as the head of a French government office, Mission for Parity in Science and Technology, when it was created in September 2001. She said that 45% of biologists were women but only 15% of physicists were women.

Françoise Cyrot-Lackmann and Claudine Hermann have both written about the gender gap in science.

== Thierry Célérier - Femmes & Sciences Award ==
The Thierry Célérier - Femmes & Sciences award was created by astronomer Marie-Noëlle Célérier in association with Femmes et Sciences and the Observatoire de Paris. Célérier founded the award to support inclusion and aspiring women with disabilities. It was named to commemorate her son who died at a young age. The first award was made in 2021 to a pre-doctoral student who required assistance to mitigate her sight issues.

== Eiffel Tower women ==
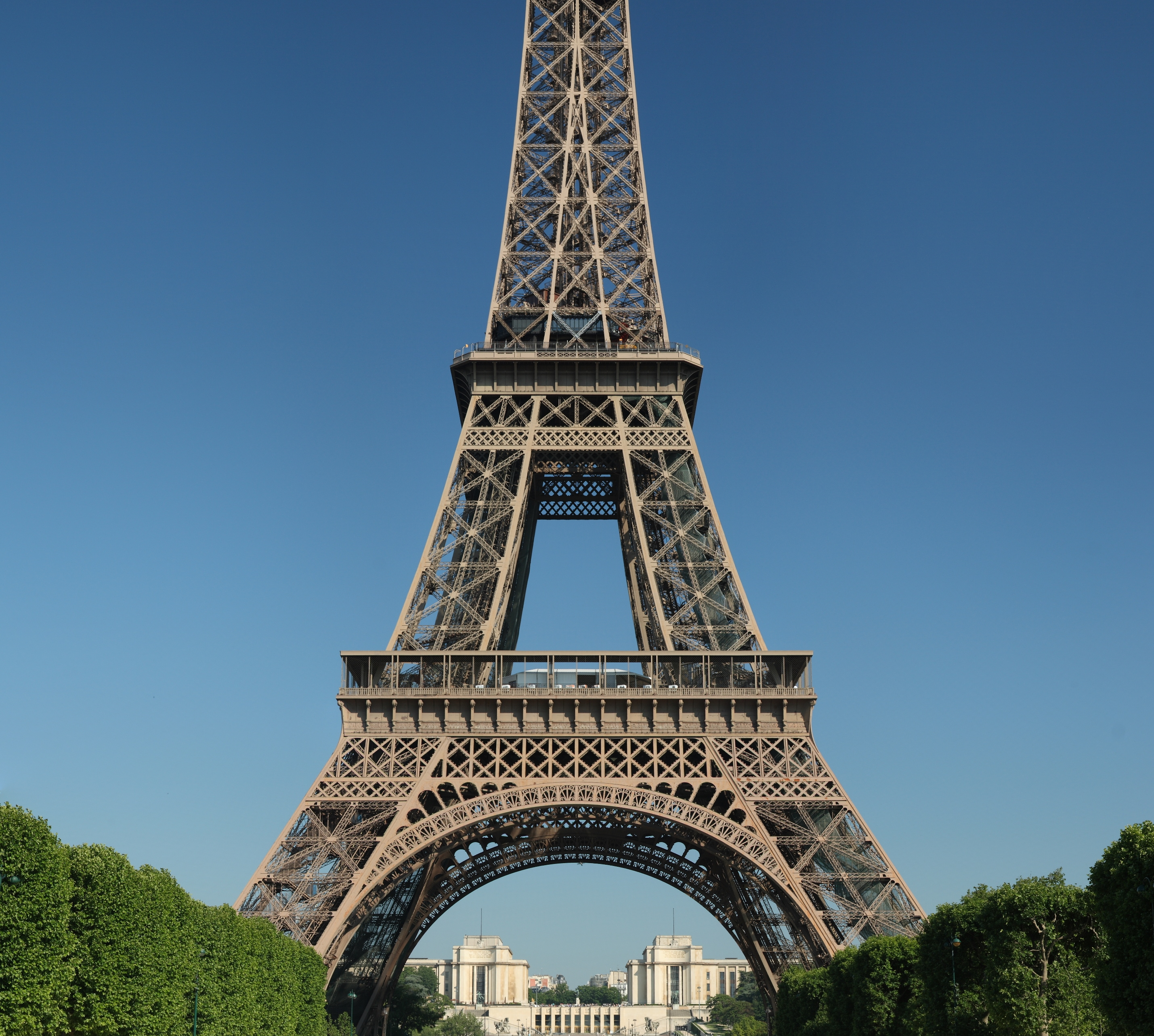
- The location of the men's names on the tower

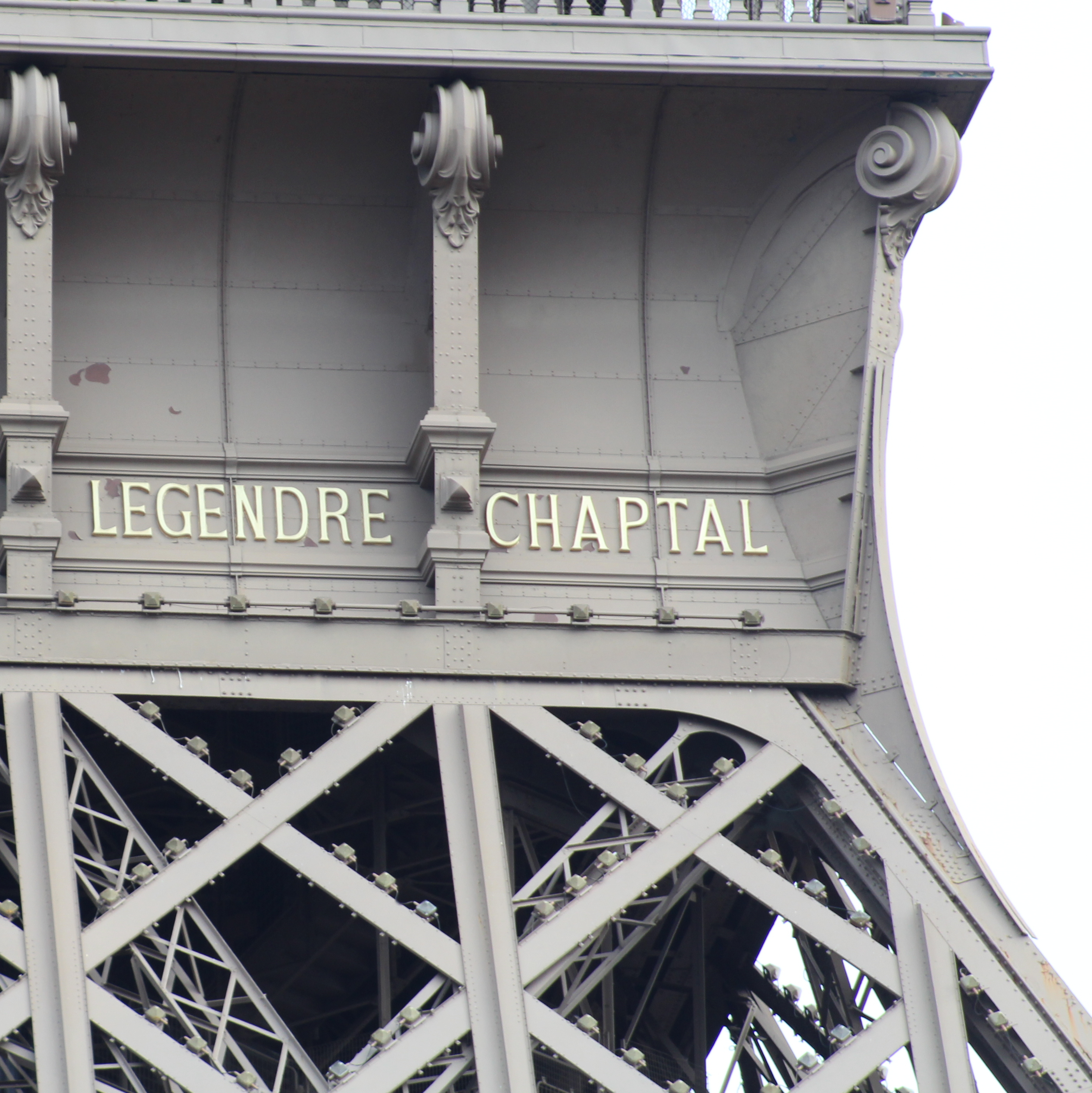
2 of the 72 men's names on the Eiffel Tower

Femmes et Sciences produces educational documents including "40 femmes scientifiques remarquables du XVIIIe siècle à nos jours" ("40 remarkable women scientists from the 18th century to today"). This was intended to inspire students and did inspire Benjamin Rigaud, a student who also worked as an Eiffel Tower tour guide in 2021. Benjamin Rigaud became a member of Femmes et Sciences.

Rigaud would point out to visitors the 72 names of scientists displayed on the tower since it was built, but he was surprised to find that there were no women included. He noticed that there were 40 spaces on the tower's second floor and this matched the number of women identified in the Femmes et Sciences's document. This led to the idea of a project, to include the missing women, which was named after Hypatia, the fourth century CE Alexandrian mathematician. The idea was taken up by Nathalie Drach-Temam, President of Sorbonne University, as Riguad chaired a Sorbonne group who were tasked with creating new ideas.

It was decided that only those women scientists who had an association with France should be considered. Rigaud was keen to see scientists who had lived and worked in France included, such as Japanese physicist Toshiko Yuasa, Senegalese-born computer scientist Rose Dieng-Kuntz, and Tunisian-born engineer Radhia Cousot.

During the partial solar eclipse of October 25, 2022, Femmes et Sciences partnered with the event "Eclipses: Women Scientists or the Hidden Face of History," organised at the Paris Observatory to launch the Hypatia Project for the Eiffel Tower. This project proposed completing the list of great scientists on the first floor of the monument by adding the names of 40 women scientists to the second floor.

The plan later evolved to include the names of 72 women in science and was announced in January 2026 by the Mayor of Paris, Anne Hidalgo following the recommendations of a committee led by Isabelle Vauglin of Femmes et Sciences and Jean-François Martins, representing the operating company which runs the Eiffel Tower.

== Expertise and interventions with institutions ==
The organisation participates in a number of regional, national and European committees to increase the visibility of women scientists, both in the public and private sectors. Claudine Hermann was a member of the jury for the Irène-Joliot-Curie prize created in 2004.

== Presidents ==
- Claudine Hermann, physicist, 2000 - 2004 (first president)
- Colette Guillopé, mathematician, 2004 - 2008
- Florence Durret, astrophysicist, 2008 - 2010
- Véronique Ezratty, graduate of Centrale and Doctor of Science, 2010 - 2013
- Nathalie Van de Wiele, physics teacher, 2013 - 2014
- Sylvaine Turck-Chièze, astrophysicist, 2014 - 2018
- Nadine Halberstadt, physicist, 2018 - 2021
- Isabelle Pianet, physicist, 2021 - 2022
- Isabelle Vauglin, astrophysicist, 2022 - 2024
- Françoise Conan, university professor, 2024 - 2026
- Myrtille Gardet, 2026-

== See also ==
- List of women's names for the Eiffel Tower
