= Function of several complex variables =

Type of mathematical functions

The theory of functions of several complex variables is the branch of mathematics dealing with functions defined on the complex coordinate space $\mathbb C^n$, that is, n-tuples of complex numbers. The name of the field dealing with the properties of these functions is called several complex variables (and analytic space), which the Mathematics Subject Classification has as a top-level heading.

As in complex analysis of functions of one variable the functions studied are holomorphic or complex analytic so that, locally, they are power series in the variables z_{i}. Equivalently, they are locally uniform limits of polynomials; or solutions to the n dimensional Cauchy–Riemann equations. For one complex variable, every domain is the domain of holomorphy of some function. For several complex variables, this is not the case; there exist domains that are not the domain of holomorphy of any function, and so is not always the domain of holomorphy, so the domain of holomorphy is one of the themes in this field. Patching the local data of meromorphic functions, i.e. the problem of creating a global meromorphic function from zeros and poles, is called the Cousin problem. Also, the interesting phenomena that occur in several complex variables are fundamentally important to the study of compact complex manifolds and complex projective varieties and has a different flavour to complex analytic geometry in $\mathbb{C}^n$ or on Stein manifolds, these are much similar to study of algebraic varieties that is study of the algebraic geometry than complex analytic geometry.

== Historical perspective ==
Many examples of such functions were familiar in nineteenth-century mathematics; abelian functions, theta functions, and some hypergeometric series, and also, as an example of an inverse problem; the Jacobi inversion problem. Naturally also same function of one variable that depends on some complex parameter is a candidate. The theory, however, for many years didn't become a full-fledged field in mathematical analysis, since its characteristic phenomena weren't uncovered. The Weierstrass preparation theorem would now be classed as commutative algebra; it did justify the local picture, ramification, that addresses the generalization of the branch points of Riemann surface theory.

With work of Friedrich Hartogs, Pierre Cousin, E. E. Levi, and of Kiyoshi Oka in the 1930s, a general theory began to emerge; others working in the area at the time were Heinrich Behnke, Peter Thullen, Karl Stein, Wilhelm Wirtinger and Francesco Severi. Hartogs proved some basic results, such as every isolated singularity is removable, for every analytic function
$$f : \mathbb C^n \to \Complex$$
whenever n > 1. Naturally the analogues of contour integrals will be harder to handle; when n = 2 an integral surrounding a point should be over a three-dimensional manifold (since we are in four real dimensions), while iterating contour (line) integrals over two separate complex variables should come to a double integral over a two-dimensional surface. This means that the residue calculus will have to take a very different character.

After 1945 important work in France, in the seminar of Henri Cartan, and Germany with Hans Grauert and Reinhold Remmert, quickly changed the picture of the theory. A number of issues were clarified, in particular that of analytic continuation. Here a major difference is evident from the one-variable theory; while for every open connected set D in $\Complex$ we can find a function that will nowhere continue analytically over the boundary, that cannot be said for n > 1. In fact the D of that kind are rather special in nature (especially in complex coordinate spaces $\mathbb C^n$ and Stein manifolds, satisfying a condition called pseudoconvexity). The natural domains of definition of functions, continued to the limit, are called Stein manifolds and their nature was to make sheaf cohomology groups vanish, on the other hand, the Grauert–Riemenschneider vanishing theorem is known as a similar result for compact complex manifolds, and the Grauert–Riemenschneider conjecture is a special case of the conjecture of Narasimhan. In fact it was the need to put (in particular) the work of Oka on a clearer basis that led quickly to the consistent use of sheaves for the formulation of the theory (with major repercussions for algebraic geometry, in particular from Grauert's work).

From this point onwards there was a foundational theory, which could be applied to analytic geometry, (Note: A name adopted, confusingly, for the geometry of zeroes of analytic functions; this is not the analytic geometry learned at school. (In other words, in the sense of GAGA on Serre.)) automorphic forms of several variables, and partial differential equations. The deformation theory of complex structures and complex manifolds was described in general terms by Kunihiko Kodaira and D. C. Spencer. The celebrated paper GAGA of Serre pinned down the crossover point from géometrie analytique to géometrie algébrique.

C. L. Siegel was heard to complain that the new theory of functions of several complex variables had few functions in it, meaning that the special function side of the theory was subordinated to sheaves. The interest for number theory, certainly, is in specific generalizations of modular forms. The classical candidates are the Hilbert modular forms and Siegel modular forms. These days these are associated to algebraic groups (respectively the Weil restriction from a totally real number field of GL(2), and the symplectic group), for which it happens that automorphic representations can be derived from analytic functions. In a sense this doesn't contradict Siegel; the modern theory has its own, different directions.

Subsequent developments included the hyperfunction theory, and the edge-of-the-wedge theorem, both of which had some inspiration from quantum field theory. There are a number of other fields, such as Banach algebra theory, that draw on several complex variables.

== The complex coordinate space ==
The complex coordinate space $\mathbb C^n$ is the Cartesian product of n copies of $\mathbb C$, and when $\mathbb C^n$ is a domain of holomorphy, $\mathbb C^n$ can be regarded as a Stein manifold, and more generalized Stein space. $\mathbb C^n$ is also considered to be a complex projective variety, a Kähler manifold, etc. It is also an n-dimensional vector space over the complex numbers, which gives its dimension 2n over $\mathbb R$. (Note: The field of complex numbers is a 2-dimensional vector space over real numbers.) Hence, as a set and as a topological space, $\mathbb C^n$ may be identified to the real coordinate space $\mathbb R^{2n}$ and its topological dimension is thus 2n.

In coordinate-free language, any vector space over complex numbers may be thought of as a real vector space of twice as many dimensions, where a complex structure is specified by a linear operator J, satisfying J^{2} = −I, which defines multiplication by the imaginary unit i.

Any such space, as a real space, is oriented. On the complex plane thought of as a Cartesian plane, multiplication by a complex number w = u + iv may be represented by the real matrix

$$\begin{pmatrix}
u & -v \\
v & u
\end{pmatrix},$$

with determinant $u^2 + v^2 = |w|^2.$ Likewise, if one expresses any finite-dimensional complex linear operator as a real matrix (which will be composed from 2 × 2 blocks of the aforementioned form), then its determinant equals to the square of absolute value of the corresponding complex determinant. It is a non-negative number, which implies that the (real) orientation of the space is never reversed by a complex operator. The same applies to Jacobians of holomorphic functions from $\mathbb C^n$ to $\mathbb C^n$.

== Holomorphic functions ==
=== Definition ===
A function f defined on a domain $D\subset \mathbb{C}^n$ and with values in $\mathbb{C}$ is said to be holomorphic at a point $z\in D$ if it is complex-differentiable at this point, in the sense that there exists a complex linear map $L:\mathbb{C}^n \to \mathbb{C}$ such that

$$f(z+h) = f(z) + L(h) + o(\lVert h\rVert)$$

The function f is said to be holomorphic if it is holomorphic at all points of its domain of definition D.

If f is holomorphic, then all the partial maps :

$$z \mapsto f(z_1,\dots,z_{i-1},z,z_{i+1},\dots,z_n)$$

are holomorphic as functions of one complex variable : we say that f is holomorphic in each variable separately. Conversely, if f is holomorphic in each variable separately, then f is in fact holomorphic : this is known as Hartog's theorem, or as Osgood's lemma under the additional hypothesis that f is continuous.

=== Cauchy–Riemann equations ===
In one complex variable, a function $f:\mathbb{C}\to \mathbb{C}$ defined on the plane is holomorphic at a point $p\in \mathbb{C}$ if its real part $u$ and its imaginary part $v$ satisfy the so-called Cauchy-Riemann equations at $p,$ namely

$$\frac{\partial u}{\partial x}(p) = \frac{\partial v}{\partial y}(p) \quad \text{ and } \quad\frac{\partial u}{\partial y} (p)=-\frac{\partial v}{\partial x}(p).$$

In several variables, a function $f:\mathbb{C}^n\to \mathbb{C}$ is holomorphic if it is holomorphic in each variable separately, and hence if the real part $u$ and the imaginary part $v$ of $f$ satisfy the Cauchy Riemann equations

$$\frac{\partial u}{\partial x_j} = \frac{\partial v}{\partial y_j} \quad \text{ and } \quad\frac{\partial u}{\partial y_j} = -\frac{\partial v}{\partial x_j},\quad j = 1, \dots, n.$$

Using the formalism of Wirtinger derivatives, this can be reformulated as

$$\frac{\partial f}{\partial \overline{z_j}} = 0,\quad j = 1, \dots, n$$

or even more compactly using the formalism of complex differential forms, as $\bar\partial f=0.$

=== Cauchy's integral formula ===
Prove the sufficiency of two conditions (A) and (B). Let f meets the conditions of being continuous and separately homorphic on domain D. Each disk has a rectifiable curve $\gamma$, $\gamma_\nu$ is piecewise smoothness, class $\mathcal{C}^1$ Jordan closed curve. ($\nu=1,2,\ldots,n$) Let $D_\nu$ be the domain surrounded by each $\gamma_\nu$. Cartesian product closure $\overline{D_1\times D_2\times\cdots\times D_n}$ is $\overline{D_1}\times \overline{D_2}\times\cdots\times \overline{D_n} \in D$. Also, take the closed polydisc $\overline{\Delta}$ so that it becomes $\overline{\Delta}\subset{D_1 \times D_2 \times \cdots \times D_n}$. $\overline{\Delta}(z,r) = \left\{\zeta=(\zeta_1, \zeta_2, \dots, \zeta_n)\in \Complex^n ; \left|\zeta_\nu - z_\nu\right| \leq r_\nu \text{ for all } \nu = 1,\dots,n\right\}$ and let $\{z_\nu \}^n_{\nu=1}$ be the center of each disk.) Using the Cauchy's integral formula of one variable repeatedly,

$$\begin{align}
f(z_1,\ldots,z_n) & =\frac{1}{2 \pi i}\int_{\partial D_1}\frac{f(\zeta_1,z_2,\ldots,z_n)}{\zeta_{1}-z_1} \, d\zeta_1 \\[6pt]
& = \frac{1}{(2 \pi i)^{2}} \int_{\partial D_2} \, d\zeta_2\int_{\partial D_1}\frac{f(\zeta_1,\zeta_2,z_3,\ldots,z_n)}{(\zeta_1 - z_1)(\zeta_2 - z_2)} \, d\zeta_1 \\[6pt]
& = \frac{1}{(2 \pi i)^n} \int_{\partial D_n} \, d\zeta_n \cdots \int_{\partial D_2} \, d\zeta_2 \int_{\partial D_1} \frac{f(\zeta_1,\zeta_2,\ldots,\zeta_n)}{(\zeta_1-z_1)(\zeta_2-z_2)\cdots(\zeta_n - z_n)} \, d\zeta_1.
\end{align}$$

Because $\partial D$ is a rectifiable Jordanian closed curve (Note: According to the Jordan curve theorem, domain D is bounded closed set, that is, each domain $D_\nu$ is compact.) and f is continuous, so the order of products and sums can be exchanged so the iterated integral can be calculated as a multiple integral. Therefore,

$f(z_1,\dots,z_n)=\frac{1}{(2\pi i)^n}\int_{\partial D_1}\cdots\int_{\partial D_n}\frac{f(\zeta_1,\dots,\zeta_n)}{(\zeta_1 - z_1) \cdots (\zeta_n - z_n)} \, d\zeta_1\cdots d\zeta_n.$	1

==== Cauchy's evaluation formula ====
Because the order of products and sums is interchangeable, from (1) we get

$\frac{\partial^{k_1 + \cdots + k_n}f(z_1,z_2,\ldots,z_n)}{\partial{z_1}^{k_1} \cdots \partial{z_n}^{k_n} } = \frac{k_1! \cdots k_n!}{(2\pi i)^n} \int_{\partial D_1} \cdots \int_{\partial D_n} \frac{f(\zeta_1,\dots,\zeta_n)}{(\zeta_1 - z_1)^{k_1+1} \cdots (\zeta_n - z_n)^{k_n + 1} } \, d\zeta_1\cdots d\zeta_n.$	2

f is class $\mathcal{C}^{\infty}$-function.

From (2), if f is holomorphic, on polydisc $\left\{ \zeta=(\zeta_1, \zeta_2, \dots, \zeta_n) \in \Complex^n ; | \zeta_\nu - z_\nu | \leq r_\nu, \text{ for all } \nu = 1,\dots,n \right\}$ and $|f| \leq {M}$, the following evaluation equation is obtained.

$$\left|\frac{\partial^{k_1 + \cdots + k_n} f(\zeta_1,\zeta_2,\ldots,\zeta_n)}{{\partial z_1}^{k_1} \cdots \partial {z_n}^{k_n}} \right| \leq \frac{Mk_1! \cdots k_n!}{{r_1}^{k_1} \cdots {r_n}^{k_n}}.$$

Therefore, Liouville's theorem hold.

==== Power series expansion of holomorphic functions on polydisc ====
If function f is holomorphic, on polydisc $\{ z=(z_1, z_2, \dots, z_n) \in \mathbb C^n ; | z_\nu - a_\nu | < r_\nu, \text{ for all } \nu = 1,\dots,n \}$, from the Cauchy's integral formula, we can see that it can be uniquely expanded to the next power series.

$$\begin{align}
& f(z)=\sum_{k_1,\dots,k_n=0}^\infty c_{k_1,\dots,k_n} (z_1 - a_1)^{k_1} \cdots (z_n - a_n)^{k_n}\ , \\
& c_{k_1 \cdots k_n}=\frac{1}{(2\pi i)^n}\int_{\partial D_1}\cdots\int_{\partial D_n}\frac{f(\zeta_1,\dots,\zeta_n)}{(\zeta_1 - a_1)^{k_1 + 1} \cdots(\zeta_n - a_n)^{k_n + 1} } \, d\zeta_1\cdots d\zeta_n.
\end{align}$$

In addition, f that satisfies the following conditions is called an analytic function.

For each point $a=(a_1,\dots,a_n)\in D \subset \mathbb C^n$, $f(z)$ is expressed as a power series expansion that is convergent on D :

$$f(z)=\sum_{k_1,\dots,k_n=0}^\infty c_{k_1,\dots,k_n}(z_1 - a_1)^{k_1}\cdots(z_n - a_n)^{k_n}.$$

We have already explained that holomorphic functions on polydisc are analytic. Also, from the theorem derived by Weierstrass, we can see that the analytic function on polydisc (convergent power series) is holomorphic.

If a sequence of functions $f_1, f_2,\dots$ converges uniformly on compact subsets of a domain D, the limit function f is holomorphic in D. Also, respective partial derivatives of $f_1, f_2, \dots$ compactly converges on domain D to the corresponding derivatives of f.

==== Radius of convergence of power series ====
It is possible to define a combination of positive real numbers $\{r_\nu \ (\nu = 1,\dots,n) \}$ such that the power series $\sum_{k_1,\dots,k_n=0}^\infty c_{k_1,\dots,k_n}(z_1-a_1)^{k_1}\cdots(z_n-a_n)^{k_n}\$ converges uniformly at $\left\{ z=(z_1, z_2, \dots, z_n) \in \Complex^n ; | z_\nu - a_\nu | < r_\nu, \text{ for all } \nu = 1,\dots,n \right\}$ and does not converge uniformly at $\left\{ z=(z_1, z_2, \dots, z_n) \in \Complex^n ; | z_\nu - a_\nu | > r_\nu, \text{ for all } \nu = 1,\dots,n \right\}$.

In this way it is possible to have a similar, combination of radius of convergence (Note: But there is a point where it converges outside the circle of convergence. For example if one of the variables is 0, then some terms, represented by the product of this variable, will be 0 regardless of the values taken by the other variables. Therefore, even if you take a variable that diverges when a variable is other than 0, it may converge.) for a one complex variable. This combination is generally not unique and there are an infinite number of combinations.

==== Laurent series expansion ====
Let $f(z)$ be holomorphic in the polyannulus $\left\{ z=(z_1, z_2, \dots, z_n) \in \Complex^n ; r_\nu < |z| <R_\nu, \text{ for all } \nu + 1,\dots, n\right\}$ and continuous on its closure. Then

$$\begin{align}f(z) & = \sum_{k=0}^{\infty}\frac{1}{k!}\frac{1}{(2\pi i)^n} \int_{|\zeta_\nu|=R_\nu}\cdots\int f(\zeta)\times\left[\frac{d^k}{dz^k}\frac{1}{\zeta-z}\right]_{z=0}df_{\zeta}\cdot z^k \\[6pt]
&+\sum_{k=1}^\infty \frac{1}{k!}\frac{1}{2\pi i}\int_{|\zeta_\nu| = r_\nu}\cdots\int f(\zeta) \times \left(0,\cdots,\sqrt{\frac{k!}{\alpha_{1}!\cdots\alpha_{n}!}}\cdot\zeta_{n}^{\alpha_1-1}\cdots\zeta_{n}^{\alpha_n-1},\cdots 0\right)df_{\zeta}\cdot\frac{1}{z^k}\ (\alpha_1 + \cdots + \alpha_n = k).
\end{align}$$

The integral in the second term, of the right-hand side is performed so as to see the zero on the left in every plane, also this integrated series is uniformly convergent in the annulus $r'_\nu < |z| < R'_\nu$, where $r'_\nu > r_\nu$ and $R'_\nu < R_\nu$, and so it is possible to integrate term.

==== Bochner–Martinelli formula ====
The Bochner–Martinelli formula is a Cauchy formula that works for general domains. It states that if f is a continuously differentiable function on the closure of a domain D in $\mathbb C^n$ with piecewise smooth boundary $\partial D$ then

$$\displaystyle f(z) = \int_{\partial D}f(\zeta)\omega(\zeta, z) - \int_D\overline\partial f(\zeta)\land\omega(\zeta,z), \quad z \in D,$$

where $\omega(\zeta,z)$ is a differential form called the Bochner-Martinelli kernel. In particular if f is holomorphic the second term vanishes, so

$$\displaystyle f(z) = \int_{\partial D}f(\zeta)\omega(\zeta, z).$$

=== Identity theorem ===
Holomorphic functions of several complex variables satisfy an identity theorem, as in one variable. Two holomorphic functions defined on the same domain set $D\subset \mathbb{C}^n$ and which coincide on an open subset N of D, are equal on the whole set D. This result can be proven from the fact that holomorphic functions have power series expansions. It can also be deduced from the one variable case. Contrary to the one variable case, it is possible that two different holomorphic functions coincide on a set which has an accumulation point, for instance the maps $f(z_1,z_2)=0$ and $g(z_1,z_2)=z_1$coincide on the whole complex line of $\mathbb{C}^2$ defined by the equation $z_1=0$.

The maximal principle, inverse function theorem, and implicit function theorems also hold. The Weierstrass preparation theorem serves as an implicit function theorem for complex variables.

=== Biholomorphism ===
From the establishment of the inverse function theorem, the following mapping can be defined.

For the domain U, V of the n-dimensional complex space $\Complex^n$, the bijective holomorphic function $\phi:U\to V$ and the inverse mapping $\phi^{-1}:V\to U$ is also holomorphic. At this time, $\phi$ is called a U, V biholomorphism also, we say that U and V are biholomorphically equivalent or that they are biholomorphic.

When $n > 1$, open balls and open polydiscs are not biholomorphically equivalent, contrasting with the single variable case, where you have the Riemann Mapping Theorem. This was proven by Poincaré in 1907 by showing that their automorphism groups have different dimensions as Lie groups. However, even in the case of several complex variables, there are some results similar to the results of the theory of uniformization in one complex variable.

=== Analytic continuation ===
Let U, V be domain on $\mathbb{C}^n$, such that $f \in \mathcal{O}(U)$ and $g \in \mathcal{O}(V)$, ($\mathcal{O}(U)$ is the set/ring of holomorphic functions on U.) assume that $U,\ V,\ U \cap V \ne \varnothing$ and $W$ is a connected component of $U \cap V$. If $f|_W =g|_W$ then f is said to be connected to V, and g is said to be analytic continuation of f. From the identity theorem, if g exists, for each way of choosing W it is unique. When n > 2, the following phenomenon occurs depending on the shape of the boundary $\partial U$: there exists domain U, V, such that all holomorphic functions $f$ over the domain U, have an analytic continuation $g \in \mathcal{O}(V)$. In other words, there may not exist a function $f \in \mathcal{O}(U)$ such that $\partial U$ as the natural boundary. This is called the Hartogs's phenomenon. Therefore, investigating when domain boundaries become natural boundaries has become one of the main research themes of several complex variables. In addition, if $n \geq 2$, it would be that the above V has an intersection part with U other than W. This contributed to advancement of the notion of sheaf cohomology.

== Reinhardt domain ==
In polydisks, the Cauchy's integral formula holds and the power series expansion of holomorphic functions is defined, because polydisks was possible to separation of variables, but it doesn't always hold for any domain. Therefore, in order to study of the domain of convergence of the power series, it was necessary to make additional restriction on the domain, this was the Reinhardt domain. Early knowledge into the properties of field of study of several complex variables, such as Logarithmically convex, Hartogs's extension theorem, etc., were given in the Reinhardt domain.

Let $D \subset \Complex^n$ to be a domain, with centre at a point $a = (a_1,\dots,a_n) \in \Complex^n$, such that, together with each point $z^0 = (z_1^0,\dots,z_n^0)\in D$, the domain also contains the set

$$\left\{ z = (z_1, \dots, z_n) ; \left|z_\nu - a_\nu \right| = \left|z_\nu^0 - a_\nu\right|,\ \nu = 1, \dots, n \right\} .$$

A domain D is called a Reinhardt domain if it satisfies the following conditions:

Let $\theta_\nu \;(\nu = 1,\dots,n)$ be arbitrary real numbers, a domain D is invariant under the rotation: $\left\{z^0 - a_\nu \right\} \to \left\{e^{i\theta_\nu} (z_\nu^0 - a_\nu) \right\}$.

The Reinhardt domains which are defined by the following condition; Together with all points of $z^0 \in D$, the domain contains the set

$$\left\{ z = ( z_1, \dots, z_n ) ; z = a + \left(z^0 - a\right) e^{i \theta} ,\ 0 \leq \theta < 2 \pi \right\}.$$

A Reinhardt domain D is called a complete Reinhardt domain with centre at a point a if together with all point $z^0\in D$ it also contains the polydisc

$$\left\{ z = ( z_1, \dots, z_n) ; \left|z_\nu - a_\nu \right| \leq \left|z_\nu^0 - a_\nu \right| , \ \nu = 1, \dots, n \right\}.$$

A complete Reinhardt domain D is star-like with regard to its centre a, and therefore, simply connected.

=== Logarithmically-convex ===
When a some complete Reinhardt domain to be the domain of convergence of a power series, an additional condition is required, which is called logarithmically convex.

A Reinhardt domain D is called logarithmically convex if the image $\lambda(D^{*})$ of the set

$$D ^{*} = \{ z = (z_1, \dots, z_n) \in D ; z_1, \dots, z_n \neq 0 \}$$

under the mapping

$$\lambda ; z \rightarrow \lambda(z) = (\ln|z_1|, \dots, \ln |z_n|)$$

is a convex set in the real coordinate space $\R^n$.

Every such domain in $\Complex^n$ is the interior of the set of points of absolute convergence of some power series in $\sum_{k_1,\dots,k_n=0}^\infty c_{k_1,\dots,k_n}(z_1 - a_1)^{k_1}\cdots(z_n - a_n)^{k_n}\$, and conversely; The domain of convergence of every power series in $z_1,\dots,z_n$ is a logarithmically convex Reinhardt domain with centre $a = 0$. (Note: When described using the domain of holomorphy, which is a generalization of the convergence domain, a Reinhardt domain is a domain of holomorphy if and only if logarithmically convex.) But, there is an example of a complete Reinhardt domain D which is not logarithmically convex.

=== Some results ===
==== Hartogs's extension theorem and Hartogs's phenomenon ====
When examining the domain of convergence on Reinhardt domains, Hartogs discovered the Hartogs's phenomenon. He found domains such that all holomorphic functions on those domains could be extended to a strictly larger domain. This is not possible in one variable.

Hartogs's extension theorem: Let G be a domain in $\Complex^n$, with n ≥ 2, and K be a compact subset of G. If G \ K is connected, then every holomorphic function on G \ K can be extended to a holomorphic function on G.

It is also called Osgood–Brown theorem is that for holomorphic functions of several complex variables, the singularity is an accumulation point, not an isolated point. This means that the various properties that hold for holomorphic functions of one-variable complex variables do not hold for holomorphic functions of several complex variables. The nature of these singularities is also derived from Weierstrass preparation theorem. A generalization of this theorem using the same method as Hartogs was proved in 2007.

==== Thullen's classic results ====
Thullen's classical result says that a 2-dimensional bounded Reinhard domain containing the origin is biholomorphic to one of the following domains provided that the orbit of the origin by the automorphism group has positive dimension:

1. $\{(z,w)\in \Complex^2;~|z| < 1,~|w| < 1\}$ (polydisc);
2. $\{(z,w)\in \Complex^2;~|z|^2 + |w|^{\frac{2}{p}} < 1\},$ where $p > 0$ (Thullen domain).

Toshikazu Sunada later generalized Thullen's result to more than two variables.

== Natural domain of the holomorphic function (domain of holomorphy) ==
When moving from the theory of one complex variable to the theory of several complex variables, depending on the range of the domain, it may not be possible to define a holomorphic function such that the boundary of the domain becomes a natural boundary. Considering the domain where the boundaries of the domain are natural boundaries (In the complex coordinate space $\Complex^n$ call the domain of holomorphy), the first result of the domain of holomorphy was the holomorphic convexity of H. Cartan and Thullen. Levi's problem shows that the pseudoconvex domain was a domain of holomorphy. (First for $\Complex^2$, later extended to $\Complex^n$.) Kiyoshi Oka's (Note: Oka, Kiyoshi (1950). "Sur les fonctions analytiques de plusieurs variables. VII. Sur quelques notions arithmétiques". Bulletin de la Société Mathématique de France. 2: 1–27. doi:10.24033/bsmf.1408., Oka, Kiyoshi (1961). "Sur les fonctions analytiques de plusieurs variables. VII. Sur quelques notions arithmétiques" (PDF). Iwanami Shoten, Tokyo (Oka's Original Version). (Note: Oka says that the contents of these two papers are different.)) notion of idéal de domaines indéterminés is interpreted theory of sheaf cohomology by H. Cartan and more development Serre. (Note: The idea of the sheaf itself is by Jean Leray.) In sheaf cohomology, the domain of holomorphy has come to be interpreted as the theory of Stein manifolds. The notion of the domain of holomorphy is also considered in other complex manifolds, furthermore also the complex analytic space which is its generalization.

=== Domain of holomorphy ===
The sets in the definition. Note: On this section, replace $\Omega$ in the figure with D

When a function f is holomorphic on the domain $D\subset \Complex^n$ and cannot directly connect to the domain outside D, including the point of the domain boundary $\partial D$, the domain D is called the domain of holomorphy of f and the boundary is called the natural boundary of f. In other words, the domain of holomorphy D is the supremum of the domain where the holomorphic function f is holomorphic, and the domain D, which is holomorphic, cannot be extended any more. For several complex variables, i.e. domain $D\subset \Complex^n\ (n\geq 2)$, the boundaries may not be natural boundaries. Hartogs' extension theorem gives an example of a domain where boundaries are not natural boundaries.

Formally, a domain D in the n-dimensional complex coordinate space $\Complex^n$ is called a domain of holomorphy if there do not exist non-empty domain $U \subset D$ and $V \subset \Complex^n$, $V \not\subset D$ and $U \subset D \cap V$ such that for every holomorphic function f on D there exists a holomorphic function g on V with $f = g$ on U.

For the $n=1$ case, every domain ($D\subset\mathbb{C}$) is a domain of holomorphy; we can find a holomorphic function that is not identically 0, but whose zeros accumulate everywhere on the boundary of the domain, which must then be a natural boundary for a domain of definition of its reciprocal.

==== Properties of domains of holomorphy ====
- If $D_1, \dots, D_n$ are domains of holomorphy, then their intersection $D = \bigcap_{\nu=1}^n D_\nu$ is also a domain of holomorphy.
- If $D_1 \subseteq D_2 \subseteq \cdots$ is an increasing sequence of domains of holomorphy, then their union $D = \bigcup_{n=1}^\infty D_n$ is also a domain of holomorphy. This result is known as the Behnke–Stein theorem.
- If $D_1$ and $D_2$ are domains of holomorphy, then $D_1 \times D_2$ is a domain of holomorphy.
- The first Cousin problem is always solvable in a domain of holomorphy, however, Cartan showed that the converse of this result was incorrect for $n\geq 3$. This is also true, with additional topological assumptions, for the second Cousin problem.

=== Holomorphically convex hull ===
Let $G \subset \Complex^n$ be a domain, or alternatively for a more general definition, let $G$ be an $n$ dimensional complex analytic manifold. Further let ${\mathcal{O}}(G)$ stand for the set of holomorphic functions on G. For a compact set $K \subset G$, the holomorphically convex hull of K is

$$\hat{K}_G = \left \{ z \in G ; |f(z)| \leq \sup_{w \in K} |f(w)| \text{ for all } f \in \mathcal{O}(G)\right \} .$$

One obtains a narrower concept of polynomially convex hull by taking $\mathcal O(G)$ instead to be the set of complex-valued polynomial functions on G. The polynomially convex hull contains the holomorphically convex hull.

The domain $G$ is called holomorphically convex if for every compact subset $K, \hat{K}_G$ is also compact in G. Sometimes this is just abbreviated as holomorph-convex.

When $n=1$, every domain $G$ is holomorphically convex since then $\hat{K}_G$ is the union of K with the relatively compact components of $G \setminus K \subset G$.

When $n\geq 1$, if f satisfies the above holomorphic convexity on D it has the following properties. $\text{dist} (K, D^c) = \text{dist} (\hat{K}_D, D^c )$ for every compact subset K in D, where $\text{dist} (K, D^c)$ denotes the distance between K and $D^c = \mathbb{C}^n \setminus D$. Also, at this time, D is a domain of holomorphy. Therefore, every convex domain $(D\subset\Complex^n)$ is domain of holomorphy.

=== Pseudoconvexity ===
Hartogs showed that

Hartogs: Let D be a Hartogs's domain on $\mathbb{C}$ and R be a positive function on D such that the set $\Omega$ in $\mathbb{C}^2$ defined by $z_1 \in D$ and $|z_2| < R (z_1)$ is a domain of holomorphy. Then $-\log {R} (z_1)$ is a subharmonic function on D.

If such a relations holds in the domain of holomorphy of several complex variables, it looks like a more manageable condition than a holomorphically convex. (Note: In fact, this was proved by Kiyoshi Oka with respect to $\Complex^n$ domain.See Oka's lemma.) The subharmonic function looks like a kind of convex function, so it was named by Levi as a pseudoconvex domain (Hartogs's pseudoconvexity). Pseudoconvex domain (boundary of pseudoconvexity) are important, as they allow for classification of domains of holomorphy. A domain of holomorphy is a global property, by contrast, pseudoconvexity is that local analytic or local geometric property of the boundary of a domain.

==== Definition of plurisubharmonic function ====
A function $u \colon D \to {\mathbb{R}}\cup\{-\infty\},$ with domain $D \subset {\mathbb{C}}^n$ is called plurisubharmonic if it is upper semi-continuous, and for every complex line $\{ a + b z ; z \in \mathbb{C} \}\subset \mathbb{C}^n$, with $a, b \in \mathbb{C}^n$, the function $z \mapsto u(a + bz)$ is a subharmonic function on the set $\{ z \in \mathbb{C} ; a + b z \in D \}.$ The notion can be defined similarly on arbitrary complex manifolds or even Complex analytic spaces.

In one complex variable, a function $u$ in $\mathcal{C}^2(\Complex)$ is subharmonic if and only if
$$\Delta u=4\left(\frac{\partial^2 u}{\partial z\partial\overline{z}}\right)\geq 0.$$
Therefore, if $u$ is of class $\mathcal{C}^2(\Complex^n)$, then $u$ is plurisubharmonic if and only if the hermitian matrix $H_u=(\lambda_{ij}),\lambda_{ij}=\frac{\partial^2u}{\partial z_i\partial\bar z_j}$ is positive semidefinite. Equivalently, a $\mathcal{C}^2(\Complex^n)$-function u is plurisubharmonic if and only if $i\partial\bar\partial u$ is a positive (1,1)-form.

When the hermitian matrix of u is positive-definite and class $\mathcal{C}^2$, we call u a strict plurisubharmonic function.

==== (Weakly) pseudoconvex (p-pseudoconvex) ====
Weak pseudoconvex is defined as : Let $X\subset {\mathbb{C}}^n$ be a domain. One says that X is pseudoconvex if there exists a continuous plurisubharmonic function $\varphi$ on X such that the set $\{ z \in X ; \varphi(z) \leq \sup x \}$ is a relatively compact subset of X for all real numbers x. (Note: This is a hullomorphically convex hull condition expressed by a plurisubharmonic function. For this reason, it is also called p-pseudoconvex or simply p-convex.) i.e. there exists a smooth plurisubharmonic exhaustion function $\psi \in \text{Psh}(X)\cap\mathcal{C}^{\infty}(X)$. Often, the definition of pseudoconvex is used here and is written as; Let X be a complex n-dimensional manifold. Then is said to be weak pseudoconvex there exists a smooth plurisubharmonic exhaustion function $\psi \in \text{Psh}(X)\cap\mathcal{C}^{\infty}(X)$.

==== Strongly (Strictly) pseudoconvex ====
Let X be a complex n-dimensional manifold. Strongly (or Strictly) pseudoconvex if there exists a smooth strictly plurisubharmonic exhaustion function $\psi \in \text{Psh}(X)\cap\mathcal{C}^{\infty}(X)$, i.e., $H\psi$ is positive definite at every point. The strongly pseudoconvex domain is the pseudoconvex domain. Strongly pseudoconvex and strictly pseudoconvex (i.e. 1-convex and 1-complete) are often used interchangeably, see Lempert for the technical difference.

==== Levi form ====
===== Levi pseudoconvexity =====
If $\mathcal{C}^2$ boundary, it can be shown that D has a defining function; i.e., that there exists $\rho: \mathbb{C}^n \to \mathbb{R}$ which is $\mathcal{C}^2$ so that $D = \{z \in \Complex^n \,;\, \rho(z) < 0 \}$, and $\partial D = \{z \in \Complex^n \,;\, \rho(z) = 0\}$. Now, D is Levi pseudoconvex if for every $p \in \partial D$ and $w$ in the complex tangent space at p we have

$H(\rho) = \sum_{i,j=1}^n \frac{\partial^2 \rho(p)}{\partial z_i \, \partial \bar{z_j} } w_i \bar{w_j} \geq 0.$

When the Levi form is positive-definite, it is called strongly Levi pseudoconvex.

==== Levi total pseudoconvex ====
If for every boundary point $\rho$ of D, there exists an analytic variety $\mathcal{B}$ passing $\rho$ which lies entirely outside D in some neighborhood around $\rho$, except the point $\rho$ itself. Domain D that satisfies these conditions is called Levi total pseudoconvex.

==== Oka pseudoconvex ====
===== Family of Oka's disk =====
Let n-functions $\varphi:z_j = \varphi_j(u, t)$ be continuous on $\Delta:|u|\leq1, 0\leq t\leq1$, holomorphic in $|u|< 1$ when the parameter t is fixed in [0, 1], and assume that $\frac{\partial\varphi_j}{\partial u}$ are not all zero at any point on $\Delta$. Then the set $Q(t):= \{Z_j= \varphi_j(u, t) \,;\,|u|\leq 1\}$ is called an analytic disc depending on a parameter t, and $B(t):= \{Z_j= \varphi_j(u, t) \,;\, |u|= 1\}$ is called its shell. If $Q(t)\subset D \ (0 <t)$ and $B(0)\subset D$, Q(t) is called Family of Oka's disk.

===== Definition =====
When $Q(0)\subset D$ holds on any family of Oka's disk, D is called Oka pseudoconvex. Oka's proof of Levi's problem was that when the unramified Riemann domain over $\mathbb{C}^n$ was a domain of holomorphy (holomorphically convex), it was proved that it was necessary and sufficient that each boundary point of the domain of holomorphy is an Oka pseudoconvex.

==== Locally pseudoconvex (a.k.a. locally Stein, Cartan pseudoconvex, local Levi property) ====
For every point $x \in \partial D$ there exist a neighbourhood U of x and f holomorphic. ( i.e. $U \cap D$ be holomorphically convex.) such that f cannot be extended to any neighbourhood of x. i.e., let $\psi : X \to Y$ be a holomorphic map, if every point $y\in Y$ has a neighborhood U such that $\psi^{-1}(U)$ admits a $\mathcal{C}^{\infty}$-plurisubharmonic exhaustion function (weakly 1-complete), in this situation, we call that X is locally pseudoconvex (or locally Stein) over Y. As an old name, it is also called Cartan pseudoconvex. In $\Complex^n$ the locally pseudoconvex domain is itself a pseudoconvex domain and it is a domain of holomorphy. For example, Diederich and Fornæss found local pseudoconvex bounded domains $\Omega$ with smooth boundary on non-Kähler manifolds such that $\Omega$ is not weakly 1-complete. (Note: Definition of weakly 1-complete.)

=== Conditions equivalent to domain of holomorphy ===
For a domain $D \subset \mathbb C^n$ the following conditions are equivalent: (Note: In algebraic geometry, there is a problem whether it is possible to remove the singular point of the complex analytic space by performing an operation called modification on the complex analytic space (when n = 2, the result by Hirzebruch, when n = 3 the result by Zariski for algebraic varieties), but, Grauert and Remmert has reported an example of a domain that is neither pseudoconvex nor holomorphic convex, even though it is a domain of holomorphy:)

1. D is a domain of holomorphy.
2. D is holomorphically convex.
3. D is the union of an increasing sequence of analytic polyhedrons in D.
4. D is pseudoconvex.
5. D is locally pseudoconvex.

The implications $1 \Leftrightarrow 2 \Leftrightarrow 3$, (Note: This relation is called the Cartan–Thullen theorem.) $1 \Rightarrow 4$, (Note: See Oka's lemma) and $4\Rightarrow 5$ are standard results. Proving $5 \Rightarrow 1$, i.e. constructing a global holomorphic function which admits no extension from non-extendable functions defined only locally, is called the Levi problem (after E. E. Levi) and was solved for unramified Riemann domains over $\mathbb{C}^n$ by Kiyoshi Oka, (Note: Oka's proof uses Oka pseudoconvex instead of Cartan pseudoconvex.) but for ramified Riemann domains, pseudoconvexity does not characterize holomorphically convexity, and then by Lars Hörmander using methods from functional analysis and partial differential equations (a consequence of $\bar{\partial}$-problem(equation) with a L^{2} methods).

== Sheaves ==
The introduction of sheaves into several complex variables allowed the reformulation of and solution to several important problems in the field.

=== Idéal de domaines indéterminés (The predecessor of the notion of the coherent sheaf) ===
Oka introduced the notion which he termed "idéal de domaines indéterminés" or "ideal of indeterminate domains". Specifically, it is a set $(I)$ of pairs $(f, \delta)$, $f$ holomorphic on a non-empty open set $\delta$, such that

1. If $(f, \delta) \in (I)$ and $(a, \delta')$ is arbitrary, then $(af, \delta \cap \delta') \in (I)$.
2. For each $(f, \delta), (f', \delta') \in (I)$, then $(f + f', \delta \cap \delta') \in (I).$

The origin of indeterminate domains comes from the fact that domains change depending on the pair $(f, \delta)$. Cartan translated this notion into the notion of the coherent (sheaf) (Especially, coherent analytic sheaf) in sheaf cohomology. This name comes from H. Cartan. Also, Serre (1955) introduced the notion of the coherent sheaf into algebraic geometry, that is, the notion of the coherent algebraic sheaf. The notion of coherent (coherent sheaf cohomology) helped solve the problems in several complex variables.

=== Coherent sheaf ===
==== Definition ====
The definition of the coherent sheaf is as follows. A quasi-coherent sheaf on a ringed space $(X, \mathcal O_X)$ is a sheaf $\mathcal F$ of $\mathcal O_X$-modules which has a local presentation, that is, every point in $X$ has an open neighborhood $U$ in which there is an exact sequence

$$\mathcal{O}_X^{\oplus I}|_{U} \to \mathcal{O}_X^{\oplus J}|_{U} \to \mathcal{F}|_{U} \to 0$$

for some (possibly infinite) sets $I$ and $J$.

A coherent sheaf on a ringed space $(X, \mathcal O_X)$ is a sheaf $\mathcal F$ satisfying the following two properties:

1. $\mathcal F$ is of finite type over $\mathcal O_X$, that is, every point in $X$ has an open neighborhood $U$ in $X$ such that there is a surjective morphism $\mathcal{O}_X^{\oplus n}|_{U} \to \mathcal{F}|_{U}$ for some natural number $n$;
2. for each open set $U\subseteq X$, integer $n > 0$, and arbitrary morphism $\varphi: \mathcal{O}_X^{\oplus n}|_{U} \to \mathcal{F}|_{U}$ of $\mathcal O_X$-modules, the kernel of $\varphi$ is of finite type.

Morphisms between (quasi-)coherent sheaves are the same as morphisms of sheaves of $\mathcal O_X$-modules.

Also, Jean-Pierre Serre (1955) proves that

If in an exact sequence $0\to \mathcal{F}_1|_U\to\mathcal{F}_2|_U\to\mathcal{F}_3|_U\to 0$ of sheaves of $\mathcal{O}$-modules two of the three sheaves $\mathcal{F}_{j}$ are coherent, then the third is coherent as well.

==== (Oka–Cartan) coherent theorem ====
(Oka–Cartan) coherent theorem says that each sheaf that meets the following conditions is a coherent:

1. the sheaf $\mathcal{O} := \mathcal{O}_{\mathbb{C}_n}$ of germs of holomorphic functions on $\mathbb{C}_n$, or the structure sheaf $\mathcal{O}_X$ of complex submanifold or every complex analytic space $(X, \mathcal{O}_X)$
2. the ideal sheaf $\mathcal{I} \langle A \rangle$ of an analytic subset A of an open subset of $\mathbb{C}_n$. (Cartan 1950)
3. the normalization of the structure sheaf of a complex analytic space

From the above Serre(1955) theorem, $\mathcal{O}^p$ is a coherent sheaf, also, (i) is used to prove Cartan's theorems A and B.

=== Cousin problem ===
In the case of one variable complex functions, Mittag-Leffler's theorem was able to create a global meromorphic function from a given and principal parts (Cousin I problem), and Weierstrass factorization theorem was able to create a global meromorphic function from a given zeroes or zero-locus (Cousin II problem). However, these theorems do not hold in several complex variables because the singularities of analytic function in several complex variables are not isolated points; these problems are called the Cousin problems and are formulated in terms of sheaf cohomology. They were first introduced in special cases by Pierre Cousin in 1895. It was Oka who showed the conditions for solving first Cousin problem for the domain of holomorphy (Note: There are some counterexamples in the domain of holomorphicity regarding second Cousin problem.) on the complex coordinate space, (Note: This is called the classic Cousin problem.) also solving the second Cousin problem with additional topological assumptions. The Cousin problem is a problem related to the analytical properties of complex manifolds, but the only obstructions to solving problems of a complex analytic property are pure topological; Serre called this the Oka principle. They are now posed, and solved, for arbitrary complex manifold M, in terms of conditions on M. M, which satisfies these conditions, is one way to define a Stein manifold. The study of the cousin's problem made us realize that in the study of several complex variables, it is possible to study of global properties from the patching of local data, that is it has developed the theory of sheaf cohomology. (e.g.Cartan seminar.)

==== First Cousin problem ====
Without the language of sheaves, the problem can be formulated as follows. On a complex manifold M, one is given several meromorphic functions $f_i$ along with domains $U_i$ where they are defined, and where each difference $f_i-f_j$ is holomorphic (wherever the difference is defined). The first Cousin problem then asks for a meromorphic function $f$ on M such that $f-f_i$ is holomorphic on $U_i$; in other words, that $f$ shares the singular behaviour of the given local function.

Now, let K be the sheaf of meromorphic functions and O the sheaf of holomorphic functions on M. The first Cousin problem can always be solved if the following map is surjective:

$$H^0(M,\mathbf{K}) \xrightarrow{\phi} H^0(M,\mathbf{K}/\mathbf{O}).$$

By the long exact cohomology sequence,

$$H^0(M,\mathbf{K}) \xrightarrow{\phi} H^0(M,\mathbf{K}/\mathbf{O})\to H^1(M,\mathbf{O})$$

is exact, and so the first Cousin problem is always solvable provided that the first cohomology group H^{1}(M,O) vanishes. In particular, by Cartan's theorem B, the Cousin problem is always solvable if M is a Stein manifold.

==== Second Cousin problem ====
The second Cousin problem starts with a similar set-up to the first, specifying instead that each ratio $f_i/f_j$ is a non-vanishing holomorphic function (where said difference is defined). It asks for a meromorphic function $f$ on M such that $f/f_i$ is holomorphic and non-vanishing.

Let $\mathbf{O}^*$ be the sheaf of holomorphic functions that vanish nowhere, and $\mathbf{K}^*$ the sheaf of meromorphic functions that are not identically zero. These are both then sheaves of abelian groups, and the quotient sheaf $\mathbf{K}^*/\mathbf{O}^*$ is well-defined. If the following map $\phi$ is surjective, then Second Cousin problem can be solved:

$$H^0(M,\mathbf{K}^*)\xrightarrow{\phi} H^0(M,\mathbf{K}^*/\mathbf{O}^*).$$

The long exact sheaf cohomology sequence associated to the quotient is

$$H^0(M,\mathbf{K}^*)\xrightarrow{\phi} H^0(M,\mathbf{K}^*/\mathbf{O}^*)\to H^1(M,\mathbf{O}^*)$$

so the second Cousin problem is solvable in all cases provided that $H^1(M,\mathbf{O}^*)=0.$

The cohomology group $H^1(M,\mathbf{O}^*)$ for the multiplicative structure on $\mathbf{O}^*$ can be compared with the cohomology group $H^1(M,\mathbf{O})$ with its additive structure by taking a logarithm. That is, there is an exact sequence of sheaves

$$0\to 2\pi i\Z\to \mathbf{O} \xrightarrow{\exp} \mathbf{O}^* \to 0$$

where the leftmost sheaf is the locally constant sheaf with fiber $2\pi i\Z$. The obstruction to defining a logarithm at the level of H^{1} is in $H^2(M,\Z)$, from the long exact cohomology sequence

$$H^1(M,\mathbf{O})\to H^1(M,\mathbf{O}^*)\to 2\pi i H^2(M,\Z) \to H^2(M, \mathbf{O}).$$

When M is a Stein manifold, the middle arrow is an isomorphism because $H^q(M,\mathbf{O}) = 0$ for $q > 0$ so that a necessary and sufficient condition in that case for the second Cousin problem to be always solvable is that $H^2(M,\Z)=0.$ (This condition called Oka principle.)

== Manifolds and analytic varieties with several complex variables ==
=== Stein manifold ===
Since a non-compact (open) Riemann surface always has a non-constant single-valued holomorphic function, and satisfies the second axiom of countability, the open Riemann surface is in fact a 1-dimensional complex manifold possessing a holomorphic mapping into the complex plane $\mathbb C$. In fact, every non-compact Riemann surface has a holomorphic immersion into the complex plane. The Whitney embedding theorem tells us that every smooth n-dimensional manifold can be embedded as a smooth submanifold of $\mathbb{R}^{2n}$, whereas it is "rare" for a complex manifold to have a holomorphic embedding into $\mathbb C^n$. For example, for an arbitrary compact connected complex manifold X, every holomorphic function on it is constant by Liouville's theorem, and so it cannot have any embedding into complex n-space. That is, for several complex variables, arbitrary complex manifolds do not always have holomorphic functions that are not constants. So, consider the conditions under which a complex manifold has a holomorphic function that is not a constant. Now if we had a holomorphic embedding of X into $\mathbb C^n$, then the coordinate functions of $\mathbb C^n$ would restrict to nonconstant holomorphic functions on X, contradicting compactness, except in the case that X is just a point. Complex manifolds that can be holomorphic embedded into $\mathbb C^n$ are called Stein manifolds. Also Stein manifolds satisfy the second axiom of countability.

A Stein manifold is a complex submanifold of the vector space of n complex dimensions. They were introduced by and named after Karl Stein (1951). A Stein space is similar to a Stein manifold but is allowed to have singularities. Stein spaces are the analogues of affine varieties or affine schemes in algebraic geometry. If the univalent domain on $\mathbb C^n$ is connection to a manifold, can be regarded as a complex manifold and satisfies the separation condition described later, the condition for becoming a Stein manifold is to satisfy the holomorphic convexity. Therefore, the Stein manifold is the properties of the domain of definition of the (maximal) analytic continuation of an analytic function.

==== Definition ====
Suppose X is a paracompact complex manifolds of complex dimension $n$ and let $\mathcal O(X)$ denote the ring of holomorphic functions on X. We call X a Stein manifold if the following conditions hold:

- X is holomorphically convex, i.e. for every compact subset $K \subset X$, the so-called holomorphically convex hull,

$$\bar K = \left \{z \in X ; |f(z)| \leq \sup_{w \in K} |f(w)|, \ \forall f \in \mathcal O(X) \right \},$$
is also a compact subset of X.

- X is holomorphically separable. (Note: From this condition, we can see that the Stein manifold is not compact.)

==== Every non-compact (open) Riemann surface is a Stein manifold ====
Let X be a connected, non-compact (open) Riemann surface. A deep theorem of Behnke and Stein (1948) asserts that X is a Stein manifold.

Another result, attributed to Hans Grauert and Helmut Röhrl (1956), states moreover that every holomorphic vector bundle on X is trivial. In particular, every line bundle is trivial, so $H^1(X, \mathcal O_X^*) =0$. The exponential sheaf sequence leads to the following exact sequence:

$$H^1(X, \mathcal O_X) \longrightarrow H^1(X, \mathcal O_X^*) \longrightarrow H^2(X, \Z) \longrightarrow H^2(X, \mathcal O_X)$$

Now Cartan's theorem B shows that $H^1(X,\mathcal{O}_X) = H^2(X,\mathcal{O}_X)=0$, therefore $H^2(X,\Z) = 0$.

This is related to the solution of the multiplicative Cousin problem.

==== Levi problems ====
Cartan extended Levi's problem to Stein manifolds.

If the relative compact open subset $D\subset X$ of the Stein manifold X is a Locally pseudoconvex, then D is a Stein manifold, and conversely, if D is a Locally pseudoconvex, then X is a Stein manifold. i.e. Then X is a Stein manifold if and only if D is locally the Stein manifold.

This was proved by Bremermann by embedding it in a sufficiently high dimensional $\mathbb{C}^n$, and reducing it to the result of Oka.

Also, Grauert proved for arbitrary complex manifolds M. (Note: Levi problem is not true for domains in arbitrary manifolds.)

If the relative compact subset $D\subset M$ of a arbitrary complex manifold M is a strongly pseudoconvex on M, then M is a holomorphically convex (i.e. Stein manifold). Also, D is itself a Stein manifold.

And Narasimhan extended Levi's problem to complex analytic space, a generalized in the singular case of complex manifolds.

A Complex analytic space which admits a continuous strictly plurisubharmonic exhaustion function (i.e.strongly pseudoconvex) is Stein space.

A pseudoconvex Complex analytic space is Stein space.

Levi's problem remains unresolved in the following cases;

Suppose that X is a singular Stein space, (Note: In the case of Stein space with isolated singularities, it has already been positively solved by Narasimhan.) $D \subset\subset X$ . Suppose that for all $p\in \partial D$ there is an open neighborhood $U (p)$ so that $U\cap D$ is Stein space. Is D itself Stein?

more generalized

Suppose that N be a Stein space and f an injective, and also $f :M \to N$ a Riemann unbranched domain, such that map f is a locally pseudoconvex map (i.e. Stein morphism). Then M is itself Stein ?

and also,

Suppose that X be a Stein space and $D = \bigcup_{n\in\mathbb{N}} D_n$ an increasing union of Stein open sets. Then D is itself Stein ?

This means that Behnke–Stein theorem, which holds for Stein manifolds, has not found a conditions to be established in Stein space.

===== K-complete =====
Grauert introduced the concept of K-complete in the proof of Levi's problem.

Let X is complex manifold, X is K-complete if, to each point $x_0\in X$, there exist finitely many holomorphic map $f_1,\dots,f_k$ of X into $\Complex^p$, $p = p(x_0)$, such that $x_0$ is an isolated point of the set $A = \{x\in X;f^{-1}f(x_0)\ (v=1,\dots,k)\}$. This concept also applies to complex analytic space.

==== Properties and examples of Stein manifolds ====
- The standard (Note: $\Complex^n \times \mathbb{P}_m$ ($\mathbb{P}_m$ is a projective complex varieties) does not become a Stein manifold, even if it satisfies the holomorphic convexity.) complex space $\Complex^n$ is a Stein manifold.
- Every domain of holomorphy in $\Complex^n$ is a Stein manifold.
- Every closed complex submanifold of a Stein manifold is also a Stein manifold.
- Every Stein manifold of complex dimension n can be embedded into $\Complex^{2 n+1}$ by a biholomorphic proper map.

These facts imply that a Stein manifold is a closed complex submanifold of complex space, whose complex structure is that of the ambient space (because the embedding is biholomorphic).

- Every Stein manifold of (complex) dimension n has the homotopy type of an n-dimensional CW-Complex.
- In one complex dimension the Stein condition can be simplified: a connected Riemann surface is a Stein manifold if and only if it is not compact. This can be proved using a version of the Runge theorem for Riemann surfaces, (Note: The proof method uses an approximation by the polyhedral domain, as in Oka-Weil theorem.) due to Behnke and Stein.
- Every Stein manifold X is holomorphically spreadable, i.e. for every point $x \in X$, there are n holomorphic functions defined on all of X which form a local coordinate system when restricted to some open neighborhood of x.
- The first Cousin problem can always be solved on a Stein manifold.
- Being a Stein manifold is equivalent to being a (complex) strongly pseudoconvex manifold. The latter means that it has a strongly pseudoconvex (or plurisubharmonic) exhaustive function, i.e. a smooth real function $\psi$ on X (which can be assumed to be a Morse function) with $i \partial \bar \partial \psi >0$, such that the subsets $\{z \in X \mid \psi (z)\leq c \}$ are compact in X for every real number c. This is a solution to the so-called Levi problem, named after E. E. Levi (1911). The function $\psi$ invites a generalization of Stein manifold to the idea of a corresponding class of compact complex manifolds with boundary called Stein domain. A Stein domain is the preimage $\{z \mid -\infty\leq\psi(z)\leq c\}$. Some authors call such manifolds therefore strictly pseudoconvex manifolds.
- Related to the previous item, another equivalent and more topological definition in complex dimension 2 is the following: a Stein surface is a complex surface X with a real-valued Morse function f on X such that, away from the critical points of f, the field of complex tangencies to the preimage $X_c=f^{-1}(c)$ is a contact structure that induces an orientation on X_{c} agreeing with the usual orientation as the boundary of $f^{-1}(-\infty, c).$ That is, $f^{-1}(-\infty, c)$ is a Stein filling of X_{c}.

Numerous further characterizations of such manifolds exist, in particular capturing the property of their having "many" holomorphic functions taking values in the complex numbers. See for example Cartan's theorems A and B, relating to sheaf cohomology.

In the GAGA set of analogies, Stein manifolds correspond to affine varieties.

Stein manifolds are in some sense dual to the elliptic manifolds in complex analysis which admit "many" holomorphic functions from the complex numbers into themselves. It is known that a Stein manifold is elliptic if and only if it is fibrant in the sense of so-called "holomorphic homotopy theory".

=== Complex projective varieties (compact complex manifold) ===
Meromorphic function in one-variable complex function were studied in a compact (closed) Riemann surface, because since the Riemann-Roch theorem (Riemann's inequality) holds for compact Riemann surfaces (Therefore, the theory of compact Riemann surface can be regarded as the theory of (smooth (non-singular) projective) algebraic curve over $\mathbb{C}$). In fact, compact Riemann surface had a non-constant single-valued meromorphic function, and also a compact Riemann surface had enough meromorphic functions. A compact one-dimensional complex manifold was a Riemann sphere $\widehat\mathbb{C} \cong \mathbb{CP}^1$. However, the abstract notion of a compact Riemann surface is always algebraizable (the Riemann's existence theorem, Kodaira embedding theorem), (Note: Note that the Riemann extension theorem and its references explained in the linked article includes a generalized version of the Riemann extension theorem by Grothendieck that was proved using the GAGA principle, also every one-dimensional compact complex manifold is a Hodge manifold.) but it is not easy to verify which compact complex analytic spaces are algebraizable. In fact, Hopf found a class of compact complex manifolds without nonconstant meromorphic functions. However, there is a Siegel result that gives the necessary conditions for compact complex manifolds to be algebraic. The generalization of the Riemann-Roch theorem to several complex variables was first extended to compact analytic surfaces by Kodaira, Kodaira also extended the theorem to three-dimensional, and n-dimensional Kähler varieties. Serre formulated the Riemann–Roch theorem as a problem of dimension of coherent sheaf cohomology, and also Serre proved Serre duality. Cartan and Serre proved the following property: the cohomology group is finite-dimensional for a coherent sheaf on a compact complex manifold M. Riemann–Roch on a Riemann surface for a vector bundle was proved by Weil in 1938. Hirzebruch generalized the theorem to compact complex manifolds in 1994 and Grothendieck generalized it to a relative version (relative statements about morphisms). Next, the generalization of the result that "the compact Riemann surfaces are projective" to the high-dimension. In particular, consider the conditions that when embedding of compact complex submanifold X into the complex projective space $\mathbb{CP}^n$. (Note: This is the standard method for compactification of $\mathbb{C}^n$, but not the only method like the Riemann sphere that was compactification of $\mathbb{C}$.) The vanishing theorem (was first introduced by Kodaira in 1953) gives the condition, when the sheaf cohomology group vanishing, and the condition is to satisfy a kind of positivity. As an application of this theorem, the Kodaira embedding theorem says that a compact Kähler manifold M, with a Hodge metric, there is a complex-analytic embedding of M into complex projective space of enough high-dimension N. In addition the Chow's theorem shows that the complex analytic subspace (subvariety) of a closed complex projective space to be an algebraic that is, so it is the common zero of some homogeneous polynomials, such a relationship is one example of what is called Serre's GAGA principle. The complex analytic sub-space(variety) of the complex projective space has both algebraic and analytic properties. Then combined with Kodaira's result, a compact Kähler manifold M embeds as an algebraic variety. This result gives an example of a complex manifold with enough meromorphic functions. Broadly, the GAGA principle says that the geometry of projective complex analytic spaces (or manifolds) is equivalent to the geometry of projective complex varieties. The combination of analytic and algebraic methods for complex projective varieties lead to areas such as Hodge theory. Also, the deformation theory of compact complex manifolds has developed as Kodaira–Spencer theory. However, despite being a compact complex manifold, there are counterexample of that cannot be embedded in projective space and are not algebraic. Analogy of the Levi problems on the complex projective space $\mathbb{CP}^n$ by Takeuchi.

== See also ==
- Bicomplex number
- Complex geometry
- CR manifold
- Dolbeault cohomology
- Harmonic maps
- Harmonic morphisms
- Infinite-dimensional holomorphy
- Oka–Weil theorem
