= Behnke–Stein theorem on Stein manifolds =

In mathematics, especially several complex variables, the Behnke–Stein theorem states that a connected, non-compact (open) Riemann surface is a Stein manifold. In other words, it states that there is a nonconstant single-valued holomorphic function (univalent function) on such a Riemann surface. It is a generalization of the Runge approximation theorem and was proved by Heinrich Behnke and Karl Stein in 1948.

== Method of proof ==
The study of Riemann surfaces typically belongs to the field of one-variable complex analysis, but the proof method uses the approximation by the polyhedron domain used in the proof of the Behnke–Stein theorem on domains of holomorphy and the Oka–Weil theorem.
