= Kiyoshi Oka =

Japanese mathematician (1901–1978)

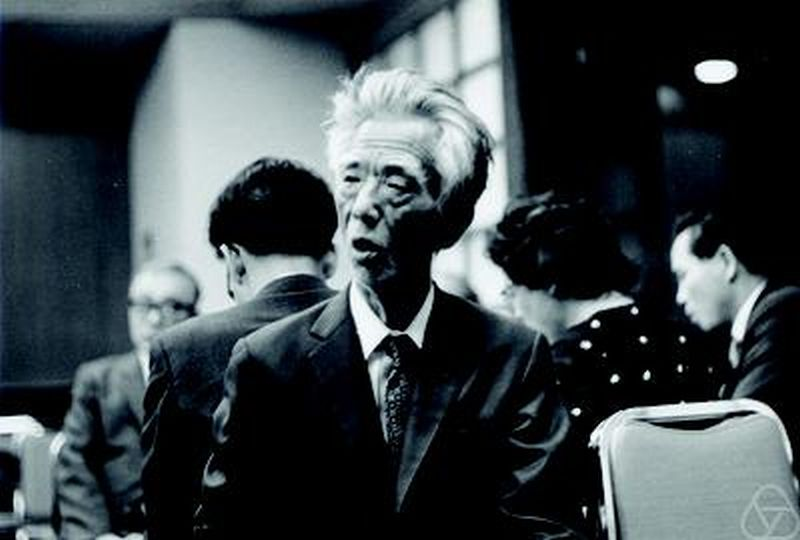
- Kiyoshi Oka in 1973
- Born: April 19, 1901; Osaka, Japan
- Died: March 1, 1978 (aged 76); Japan
- Education: Kyoto Imperial University
- Known for: Oka coherence theorem Oka's lemma Oka–Weil theorem Plurisubharmonic function
- Awards: Asahi Prize (1953); Japan Academy Prize (1951); Order of Culture (1960); Order of the Sacred Treasure, 1st class (1973)
- Scientific career
- Fields: Mathematician
- Workplaces: Kyoto Imperial University; Hiroshima University; Hokkaido University; Nara Women's University; Kyoto Sangyo University

Kiyoshi Oka (岡 潔, Oka Kiyoshi; April 19, 1901 – March 1, 1978) was a Japanese mathematician who did fundamental work in the theory of several complex variables.

== Biography ==
Oka was born in Osaka. He went to Kyoto Imperial University in 1919, turning to mathematics in 1923 and graduating in 1924.

He was in Paris for three years from 1929, returning to Hiroshima University. He published solutions to the first and second Cousin problems, and work on domains of holomorphy, in the period 1936–1940. He received his Doctor of Science degree from Kyoto Imperial University in 1940. These were later taken up by Henri Cartan and his school, playing a basic role in the development of sheaf theory.

The Oka–Weil theorem is due to a work of André Weil in 1935 and Oka's work in 1937.

Oka continued to work in the field, and proved Oka's coherence theorem in 1950. Oka's lemma is also named after him.

He was a professor at Nara Women's University from 1949 to retirement at 1964. He received many honours in Japan.

== Honors ==
- 1951 Japan Academy Prize
- 1954 Asahi Prize
- 1960 Order of Culture
- 1973 Order of the Sacred Treasure, 1st class

== Bibliography ==
- KIYOSHI OKA COLLECTED PAPERS
  - Oka, Kiyoshi (1961). Sur les fonctions analytiques de plusieurs variables (in French). Tokyo, Japan: Iwanami Shoten. p. 234. - Includes bibliographical references.
  - Oka, Kiyoshi (1983). Sur les fonctions analytiques de plusieurs variables (in French) (Nouv. ed. augmentee. ed.). Tokyo, Japan: Iwanami. p. 246.
  - Oka, Kiyoshi (1984). Reinhold Remmert (ed.). Kiyoshi Oka Collected Papers. Translated by Raghavan Narasimhan. Commentary: Henri Cartan. Springer-Verlag. p. 223. ISBN 0-387-13240-6.

=== Selected papers (Sur les fonctions analytiques de plusieurs variables) ===
1. Oka, Kiyoshi (1936). "Domaines convexes par rapport aux fonctions rationnelles". Journal of Science of the Hiroshima University. 6: 245–255. doi:10.32917/hmj/1558749869. PDF TeX
2. Oka, Kiyoshi (1937). "Domaines d'holomorphie". Journal of Science of the Hiroshima University. 7: 115–130. doi:10.32917/hmj/1558576819. PDF TeX.
3. Oka, Kiyoshi (1939). "Deuxième problème de Cousin". Journal of Science of the Hiroshima University. 9: 7–19. doi:10.32917/hmj/1558490525. PDF TeX.
4. Oka, Kiyoshi (1941). "Domaines d'holomorphie et domaines rationnellement convexes". Japanese Journal of Mathematics. 17: 517–521. doi:10.4099/jjm1924.17.0_517. PDF TeX.
5. Oka, Kiyoshi (1941). "L'intégrale de Cauchy". Japanese Journal of Mathematics. 17: 523–531. PDF TeX.
6. Oka, Kiyoshi (1942). "Domaines pseudoconvexes". Tôhoku Mathematical Journal. 49: 15–52. PDF TeX.
7. Oka, Kiyoshi (1950). "Sur quelques notions arithmétiques". Bulletin de la Société Mathématique de France. 78: 1–27. doi:10.24033/bsmf.1408. PDF TeX.
8. Oka, Kiyoshi (1951). "Sur les Fonctions Analytiques de Plusieurs Variables, VIII--Lemme Fondamental". Journal of the Mathematical Society of Japan. 3: 204–214, pp. 259–278. doi:10.2969/jmsj/00310204. PDF TeX.
9. Oka, Kiyoshi (1953). "Domaines finis sans point critique intérieur". Japanese Journal of Mathematics. 27: 97–155. doi:10.4099/jjm1924.23.0_97. PDF TeX.
10. Oka, Kiyoshi (1962). "Une mode nouvelle engendrant les domaines pseudoconvexes". Japanese Journal of Mathematics. 32: 1–12. doi:10.4099/jjm1924.32.0_1. PDF TeX.
11. Oka, Kiyoshi (1934). "Note sur les familles de fonctions analytiques multiformes etc". Journal of Science of the Hiroshima University. Ser.A 4: 93–98. doi:10.32917/hmj/1558749763. PDF TeX.
12. Oka, Kiyoshi (1941). "Sur les domaines pseudoconvexes". Proc. Imp. Acad. Tokyo. 17 (1): 7–10. doi:10.3792/pia/1195578912. PDF TeX.
13. Oka, Kiyoshi (1949). "Note sur les fonctions analytiques de plusieurs variables". Kodai Math. Sem. Rep. 1 (5–6): 15–18. doi:10.2996/kmj/1138833536. PDF TeX.
