= Oka coherence theorem =

Theorem in complex analysis about the sheaf of holomorphic functions

In mathematics, specifically algebraic geometry, the Oka coherence theorem, proved by Kiyoshi Oka in 1950, states that the sheaf $\mathcal{O}_{\mathbb{C}^n}$ of holomorphic functions on $\mathbb{C}^n$ (and subsequently the sheaf $\mathcal{O}_{X}$ of holomorphic functions on a complex manifold $X$) is coherent.

== See also ==
- Cartan's theorems A and B
- Several complex variables
- GAGA
- Oka–Weil theorem
- Weierstrass preparation theorem
