= Analytic polyhedron =

Subset of complex n-space bounded by analytic functions

In mathematics, especially several complex variables, an analytic polyhedron is a subset of the complex space C^{n} of the form

$$P = \{ z \in D : |f_j(z)| < 1, \;\; 1 \le j \le N \}$$

where D is a bounded connected open subset of C^{n}, $f_j$ are holomorphic on D and P is assumed to be relatively compact in D. If $f_j$ above are polynomials, then the set is called a polynomial polyhedron. Every analytic polyhedron is a domain of holomorphy and it is thus pseudo-convex.

The boundary of an analytic polyhedron is contained in the union of the set of hypersurfaces

$$\sigma_j = \{ z \in D : |f_j(z)| = 1 \}, \; 1 \le j \le N.$$

An analytic polyhedron is a Weil polyhedron, or Weil domain if the intersection of any k of the above hypersurfaces has dimension no greater than 2n-k.

== See also ==
- Behnke–Stein theorem
- Bergman–Weil formula
- Oka–Weil theorem
