= Friedrich Hartogs =

German mathematician

Friedrich Moritz Hartogs
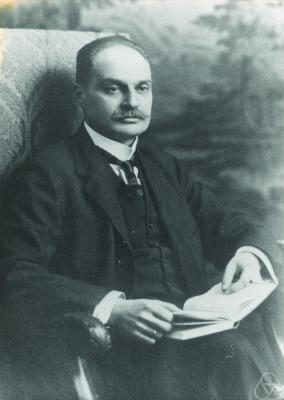
- Friedrich Hartogs
- Born: 20 May 1874; Brussels
- Died: 18 August 1943 (aged 69); Munich
- Known for: Hartogs domain Hartogs number Hartogs's theorem Hartogs's extension theorem Hartogs–Rosenthal theorem
- Scientific career
- Fields: complex analysis, set theory, several complex variables
- Doctoral advisor: Alfred Pringsheim

Friedrich Moritz "Fritz" Hartogs (20 May 1874 – 18 August 1943) was a German-Jewish mathematician, known for his work on set theory and foundational results on several complex variables.

== Life ==
Hartogs was the son of the merchant Gustav Hartogs and his wife Elise Feist and grew up in Frankfurt am Main. He studied at the Königliche Technische Hochschule in Hanover, at the Technische Hochschule Charlottenburg, at the Friedrich Wilhelm University of Berlin, and at the Ludwig-Maximilians-Universität München, graduating with a doctorate in 1903 that was supervised by Alfred Pringsheim. He obtained his Habilitation in 1905 and was Privatdozent and from 1910 professor at the Ludwig-Maximilians-Universität München, until 1927 as extraordinary professor and afterward as ordinary professor. As a Jew, he suffered greatly under the Nazi regime: he was fired in 1935, was mistreated and briefly interned in Dachau concentration camp in 1938, and eventually committed suicide in 1943.

== Work ==
Hartogs' main work was in several complex variables where he is known for Hartogs's theorem, Hartogs's lemma (also known as Hartogs's principle or Hartogs's extension theorem) and the concepts of holomorphic hull and domain of holomorphy.

In set theory, he contributed to the theory of well-orders and proved what is also known as Hartogs's theorem: for every set x there is a well-ordered set that cannot be injectively embedded in x. The smallest such set is known as the Hartogs number or Hartogs Aleph of x.
