= Stein manifold =

Term in mathematics

In mathematics, in the theory of several complex variables and complex manifolds, a Stein manifold is a closed, complex submanifold of the vector space of n complex dimensions. More intrinsically it can be defined as a complex manifold admitting a proper holomorphic embedding into $\C^n$ for some $n$. They were introduced by and named after Karl Stein (1951). A Stein space is similar to a Stein manifold but is allowed to have singularities. Stein spaces are the analogues of affine varieties or affine schemes in algebraic geometry.

== Definition ==
Suppose $X$ is a complex manifold of complex dimension $n$ and let $\mathcal O(X)$ denote the ring of holomorphic functions on $X.$ We call $X$ a Stein manifold if the following two conditions hold:

- $X$ is holomorphically convex, i.e. for every compact subset $K \subset X$, the so-called holomorphic hull (or envelope of holomorphy) of $K$,$\widehat K := \left \{z \in X \,\left|\, |f(z)| \leq \sup_{w \in K} |f(w)| \ \forall f \in \mathcal O(X) \right. \right \},$

is also a compact subset of $X$.

- $X$ is holomorphically separable, i.e. if $x \neq y$ are two distinct points in $X$, then there exists $f \in \mathcal O(X)$ such that $f(x) \neq f(y).$

== Non-compact Riemann surfaces are Stein manifolds ==
Let X be a connected, non-compact Riemann surface. A deep theorem of Heinrich Behnke and Stein (1948) asserts that X is a Stein manifold.

Another result, attributed to Hans Grauert and Helmut Röhrl (1956), states moreover that every holomorphic vector bundle, and in particular every holomorphic line bundle, on this Riemann surface X is trivial. In particular, every line bundle is trivial. This is related to the solution of the second Cousin problem.

== Properties and examples of Stein manifolds ==
- The standard complex space $\Complex^n$ is a Stein manifold.
- Every domain of holomorphy in $\Complex^n$ is a Stein manifold.
- Every Fatou–Bieberbach domain in $\Complex^n$ is a Stein manifold.
- Every closed complex submanifold of a Stein manifold is a Stein manifold, too.
- The embedding theorem for Stein manifolds states the following: Every Stein manifold $X$ of complex dimension $n$ can be embedded into $\Complex^{2 n+1}$ by a biholomorphic proper map.

These facts imply that a Stein manifold is a closed complex submanifold of complex space, whose complex structure is that of the ambient space (because the embedding is biholomorphic).

- Every Stein manifold of (complex) dimension n has the homotopy type of an n-dimensional CW-complex.
- In one complex dimension the Stein condition can be simplified: a connected Riemann surface is a Stein manifold if and only if it is not compact. This can be proved using a version of the Runge theorem for Riemann surfaces, due to Behnke and Stein.
- Every Stein manifold $X$ is holomorphically spreadable, i.e. for every point $x \in X$, there are $n$ holomorphic functions defined on all of $X$ which form a local coordinate system when restricted to some open neighborhood of $x$.
- Being a Stein manifold is equivalent to being a (complex) strongly pseudoconvex manifold. The latter means that it has a strongly pseudoconvex (or plurisubharmonic) exhaustive function, i.e. a smooth real function $\psi$ on $X$ (which can be assumed to be a Morse function) with $i \partial \bar \partial \psi >0$, such that the subsets $\{z \in X \mid \psi (z)\leq c \}$ are compact in $X$ for every real number $c$. This result, due to Grauert and generalized to Stein spaces by Narasimhan, is usually called the solution to the Levi problem, named after Eugenio Levi (1911). The function $\psi$ invites a generalization of Stein manifold to the idea of a corresponding class of compact complex manifolds with boundary called Stein domains. A Stein domain is the preimage $\{z \mid -\infty\leq\psi(z)\leq c\}$. Some authors therefore call such manifolds strictly pseudoconvex manifolds.
- Related to the previous item, another equivalent and more topological definition in complex dimension 2 is the following: a Stein surface is a complex surface X with a real-valued Morse function f on X such that, away from the critical points of f, the field of complex tangencies to the preimage $X_c=f^{-1}(c)$ is a contact structure that induces an orientation on X_{c} agreeing with the usual orientation as the boundary of $f^{-1}(-\infty, c).$ That is, $f^{-1}(-\infty, c)$ is a Stein filling of X_{c}.

Numerous further characterizations of such manifolds exist, in particular capturing the property of their having "many" holomorphic functions taking values in the complex numbers. See for example Cartan's theorems A and B, relating to sheaf cohomology. The initial impetus was to have a description of the properties of the domain of definition of the (maximal) analytic continuation of an analytic function.

In the GAGA set of analogies, Stein manifolds correspond to affine varieties.

Stein manifolds are in some sense dual to the elliptic manifolds in complex analysis which admit "many" holomorphic functions from the complex numbers into themselves. It is known that a Stein manifold is elliptic if and only if it is fibrant in the sense of so-called "holomorphic homotopy theory".

== Relation to smooth manifolds ==
Every compact smooth manifold of dimension 2n, which has only handles of index ≤ n, has a Stein structure provided n > 2, and when n = 2 the same holds provided the 2-handles are attached with certain framings (framing less than the Thurston–Bennequin framing). Every closed smooth 4-manifold is a union of two Stein 4-manifolds glued along their common boundary.

== Stein manifolds and curvature ==
If X is a Stein manifold, then as it embeds into $\C^n$and since holomorphic bisectional curvature decreases on submanifolds, X has a Kähler metric of nonpositive holomorphic bisectional curvature. The reciprocal is known to be false: there are examples of simply-connected compact (and hence not Stein) projective manifolds admitting a metric of nonpositive holomorphic bisectional curvature. There is a weaker result, due to Wu in 1967, which states that any simply-connected complete Kähler manifold of nonpositive sectional curvature is a Stein manifold.
