= Hartogs's extension theorem =

Singularities of holomorphic functions extend infinitely outward

In the theory of functions of several complex variables, Hartogs's extension theorem is a statement about the singularities of holomorphic functions of several variables. Informally, it states that the support of the singularities of such functions cannot be compact, therefore the singular set of a function of several complex variables must (loosely speaking) 'go off to infinity' in some direction. More precisely, it shows that an isolated singularity is always a removable singularity for any analytic function of n > 1 complex variables. A first version of this theorem was proved by Friedrich Hartogs, and as such it is known also as Hartogs's lemma and Hartogs's principle: in earlier Soviet literature, it is also called the Osgood–Brown theorem, acknowledging later work by Arthur Barton Brown and William Fogg Osgood. This property of holomorphic functions of several variables is also called Hartogs's phenomenon: however, the locution "Hartogs's phenomenon" is also used to identify the property of solutions of systems of partial differential or convolution equations satisfying Hartogs-type theorems.

== Historical note ==
The original proof was given by Friedrich Hartogs in 1906, using Cauchy's integral formula for functions of several complex variables. Today, usual proofs rely on either the Bochner–Martinelli–Koppelman formula or the solution of the inhomogeneous Cauchy–Riemann equations with compact support. The latter approach is due to Leon Ehrenpreis who initiated it in the paper (Ehrenpreis 1961). Yet another very simple proof of this result was given by Gaetano Fichera in the paper (Fichera 1957), by using his solution of the Dirichlet problem for holomorphic functions of several variables and the related concept of CR-function: later he extended the theorem to a certain class of partial differential operators in the paper (Fichera 1983), and his ideas were later further explored by Giuliano Bratti. Also the Japanese school of the theory of partial differential operators worked much on this topic, with notable contributions by Akira Kaneko. Their approach is to use Ehrenpreis's fundamental principle.

== Hartogs's phenomenon ==
For example, in two variables, consider the interior domain

$$H_\varepsilon = \{z=(z_1,z_2)\in\Delta^2:|z_1|<\varepsilon\ \ \text{or}\ \ 1-\varepsilon< |z_2|\}$$

in the two-dimensional polydisk $\Delta^2=\{z\in\mathbb{C}^2;|z_1|<1,|z_2|<1\}$ where $0 < \varepsilon < 1.$

Theorem Hartogs (1906): Any holomorphic function $f$ on $H_\varepsilon$ can be analytically continued to $\Delta^2.$ Namely, there is a holomorphic function $F$ on $\Delta^2$ such that $F=f$ on $H_\varepsilon.$

Such a phenomenon is called Hartogs's phenomenon, which lead to the notion of this Hartogs's extension theorem and the domain of holomorphy.

== Formal statement and proof ==
Let f be a holomorphic function on a set G \ K, where G is an open subset of C^{n} (n ≥ 2) and K is a compact subset of G. If the complement G \ K is connected, then f can be extended to a unique holomorphic function F on G.

Ehrenpreis' proof is based on the existence of smooth bump functions, unique continuation of holomorphic functions, and the Poincaré lemma — the last in the form that for any smooth and compactly supported differential (0,1)-form ω on C^{n} with ∂ω = 0, there exists a smooth and compactly supported function η on C^{n} with ∂η = ω. The crucial assumption n ≥ 2 is required for the validity of this Poincaré lemma; if n = 1 then it is generally impossible for η to be compactly supported.

The ansatz for F is φ f − v for smooth functions φ and v on G; such an expression is meaningful provided that φ is identically equal to zero where f is undefined (namely on K). Furthermore, given any holomorphic function on G which is equal to f on some open set, unique continuation (based on connectedness of G \ K) shows that it is equal to f on all of G \ K.

The holomorphicity of this function is identical to the condition ∂v = f ∂φ. For any smooth function φ, the differential (0,1)-form f ∂φ is ∂-closed. Choosing φ to be a smooth function which is identically equal to zero on K and identically equal to one on the complement of some compact subset L of G, this (0,1)-form additionally has compact support, so that the Poincaré lemma identifies an appropriate v of compact support. This defines F as a holomorphic function on G; it only remains to show (following the above comments) that it coincides with f on some open set.

On the set C^{n} \ L, v is holomorphic since φ is identically constant. Since it is zero near infinity, unique continuation applies to show that it is identically zero on some open subset of G \ L. Thus, on this open subset, F equals f and the existence part of Hartog's theorem is proved. Uniqueness is automatic from unique continuation, based on connectedness of G.

== Counterexamples in dimension one ==
The theorem does not hold when n = 1. To see this, it suffices to consider the function f(z) = z^{−1}, which is clearly holomorphic in C \ {0}, but cannot be continued as a holomorphic function on the whole of C. Therefore, the Hartogs's phenomenon is an elementary phenomenon that highlights the difference between the theory of functions of one and several complex variables.
