= Plurisubharmonic function =

Type of function in complex analysis

In mathematics, plurisubharmonic functions (sometimes abbreviated as psh, plsh, or plush functions) form an important class of functions used in complex analysis. On a Kähler manifold, plurisubharmonic functions form a subset of the subharmonic functions. However, unlike subharmonic functions (which are defined on a Riemannian manifold) plurisubharmonic functions can be defined in full generality on complex analytic spaces.

== Formal definition ==
A function $f \colon G \to {\mathbb{R}}\cup\{-\infty\},$ with domain $G \subset {\mathbb{C}}^n$ is called plurisubharmonic if it is upper semi-continuous, and for every complex line

$\{ a + b z \mid z \in {\mathbb{C}} \}\subset {\mathbb{C}}^n,$ with $a, b \in {\mathbb{C}}^n,$

the function $z \mapsto f(a + bz)$ is a subharmonic function on the set

$$\{ z \in {\mathbb{C}} \mid a + b z \in G \}.$$

In full generality, the notion can be defined on an arbitrary complex manifold or even a complex analytic space $X$ as follows. An upper semi-continuous function $f \colon X \to {\mathbb{R}} \cup \{ - \infty \}$ is said to be plurisubharmonic if for any holomorphic map $\varphi\colon\Delta\to X$ the function $f\circ\varphi \colon \Delta \to {\mathbb{R}} \cup \{ - \infty \}$ is subharmonic, where $\Delta\subset{\mathbb{C}}$ denotes the unit disk.

=== Differentiable plurisubharmonic functions ===
If $f$ is of (differentiability) class $C^2$, then $f$ is plurisubharmonic if and only if the hermitian matrix $L_f=(\lambda_{ij})$, called Levi matrix, with entries

$$\lambda_{ij}=\frac{\partial^2f}{\partial z_i\partial\bar z_j}$$

is positive semidefinite.

Equivalently, a $C^2$-function f is plurisubharmonic if and only if $i\partial\bar\partial f$ is a positive (1,1)-form.

== Examples ==
Relation to Kähler manifold: On n-dimensional complex Euclidean space $\mathbb{C}^n$ , $f(z) = |z|^2$ is plurisubharmonic. In fact, $i\partial\overline{\partial}f$ is equal to the standard Kähler form on $\mathbb{C}^n$ up to constant multiples. More generally, if $g$ satisfies

$$i\partial\overline{\partial}g=\omega$$

for some Kähler form $\omega$, then $g$ is plurisubharmonic, which is called Kähler potential. These can be readily generated by applying the ddbar lemma to Kähler forms on a Kähler manifold.

Relation to Dirac Delta: On 1-dimensional complex Euclidean space $\mathbb{C}^1$ , $u(z) = \log|z|$ is plurisubharmonic. If $f$ is a C^{∞}-class function with compact support, then Cauchy integral formula says

$$f(0)=\frac{1}{2\pi i}\int_D\frac{\partial f}{\partial\bar{z}}\frac{dzd\bar{z}}{z},$$

which can be modified to

$$\frac{i}{\pi}\partial\overline{\partial}\log|z|=dd^c\log|z|$$.

It is nothing but Dirac measure at the origin 0 .

More Examples

- If $f$ is an analytic function on an open set, then $\log|f|$ is plurisubharmonic on that open set.
- Convex functions are plurisubharmonic.
- If $\Omega$ is a domain of holomorphy then $-\log (dist(z,\Omega^c))$ is plurisubharmonic.

== History ==
Plurisubharmonic functions were defined in 1942 by Kiyoshi Oka and Pierre Lelong.

== Properties ==
- The set of plurisubharmonic functions has the following properties like a convex cone:

- if $f$ is a plurisubharmonic function and $c>0$ a positive real number, then the function $c\cdot f$ is plurisubharmonic,
- if $f_1$ and $f_2$ are plurisubharmonic functions, then the sum $f_1+f_2$ is a plurisubharmonic function.

- Plurisubharmonicity is a local property, i.e. a function is plurisubharmonic if and only if it is plurisubharmonic in a neighborhood of each point.
- If $f$ is plurisubharmonic and $\varphi:\mathbb{R}\to\mathbb{R}$ an increasing convex function then $\varphi \circ f$ is plurisubharmonic. ($\varphi(-\infty)$ is interpreted as $\lim_{x \rightarrow -\infty} \varphi(x)$.)
- If $f_1$ and $f_2$ are plurisubharmonic functions, then the function $\max(f_1,f_2)$ is plurisubharmonic.
- The pointwise limit of a decreasing sequence of plurisubharmonic functions is plurisubharmonic.
- Every continuous plurisubharmonic function can be obtained as the limit of a decreasing sequence of smooth plurisubharmonic functions. Moreover, this sequence can be chosen uniformly convergent.
- The inequality in the usual semi-continuity condition holds as equality, i.e. if $f$ is plurisubharmonic then $\limsup_{x\to x_0}f(x) =f(x_0)$.
- Plurisubharmonic functions are subharmonic, for any Kähler metric.
- Therefore, plurisubharmonic functions satisfy the maximum principle, i.e. if $f$ is plurisubharmonic on the domain $D$ and $\sup_{x\in D}f(x) =f(x_0)$ for some point $x_0\in D$ then $f$ is constant.

== Applications ==
In several complex variables, plurisubharmonic functions are used to describe pseudoconvex domains, domains of holomorphy and Stein manifolds.

== Oka theorem ==
The main geometric application of the theory of plurisubharmonic functions is the famous theorem proven by Kiyoshi Oka in 1942.

A continuous function $f:\; M \mapsto {\mathbb R}$ is called exhaustive if the preimage $f^{-1}((-\infty, c])$ is compact for all $c\in {\mathbb R}$. A plurisubharmonic function f is called strongly plurisubharmonic if the form $i\partial\bar\partial f-\omega$ is positive, for some Kähler form $\omega$ on M.

Theorem of Oka: Let M be a complex manifold, admitting a smooth, exhaustive, strongly plurisubharmonic function. Then M is a Stein manifold. Conversely, any Stein manifold admits such a function.
