= Oka's lemma =

Theorem in mathematics about plurisubharmonic functions

In mathematics, Oka's lemma, proved by Kiyoshi Oka, states that in a domain of holomorphy in $\Complex^n$, the function $-\log d(z)$ is plurisubharmonic, where $d$ is the distance to the boundary. This property shows that the domain is pseudoconvex. Historically, this lemma was first shown in the Hartogs domain in the case of two variables. Furthermore, Oka's lemma is the inverse of Levi's problem (unramified Riemann domain over $\Complex^n$). This may be why Oka referred to Levi's problem as "problème inverse de Hartogs", and could explain why Levi's problem is occasionally referred to as Hartogs' Inverse Problem.
