= Hans Grauert =

German mathematician (1930–2011)

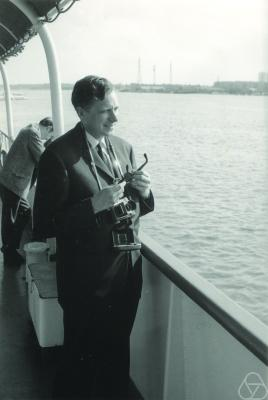
- Grauert in Moscow, 1966
- Born: 8 February 1930
- Died: 4 September 2011 (aged 81)
- Education: University of Münster
- Known for: Complex analytic space Grauert's theorem Andreotti–Grauert theorem Grauert–Riemenschneider vanishing theorem
- Awards: Cantor medal (2008); ICM Speaker (1958, 1962 and 1968)
- Scientific career
- Fields: Mathematician
- Workplaces: University of Göttingen
- Doctoral advisor: Heinrich Behnke; Beno Eckmann
- Doctoral students: Wolf Barth

Hans Grauert (8 February 1930 in Haren, Emsland, Germany – 4 September 2011) was a German mathematician. He is known for major works on several complex variables, complex manifolds and the application of sheaf theory in this area, which influenced later work in algebraic geometry. Together with Reinhold Remmert he established and developed the theory of complex-analytic spaces.

== Professorship ==
Grauert attended school at the Gymnasium in Meppen before studying for a semester at the University of Mainz in 1949, and then at the University of Münster, where he was awarded his doctorate in 1954.

He became professor at the University of Göttingen in 1958, as successor to C. L. Siegel. The lineage of this chair traces back through an eminent line of mathematicians: Weyl, Hilbert, Riemann, and ultimately to Gauss. Until his death, he was professor emeritus at Göttingen.

== Grauert's approximation theorem ==
Grauert's approximation theorem, due to Grauert, is an analog of Whitney’s approximation theorem for real-analytic maps. It states: with respect to the Whitney topology (also known as strong topology), the space of real-analytic maps between real-analytic manifolds is dense in the space of smooth maps between those manifolds. In the compact case, the theorem is due to Morrey. The case when there is an analytic Riemannian metric is due to Bochner.

== Awards ==
Grauert was awarded a fellowship of the Leopoldina and the von Staudt Prize.

== Publications ==
- Grauert, Hans (1994), Selected papers. Vol. I, II, Berlin, New York: Springer-Verlag, ISBN 978-3-540-57107-0, MR 1314425
- with Klaus Fritzsche: Several Complex Variables, 1976; hbk Grauert, H.; Fritzsche, K. (6 December 2012). softcover reprint 2012. Springer. ISBN 978-1-4612-9874-8.
- with Klaus Fritzsche: Fritzsche, Klaus; Grauert, Hans (2002), From Holomorphic Functions to Complex Manifolds, Springer, ISBN 978-0-387-95395-3

== See also ==
- Faltings' theorem
- Levi problem
