= Pseudoconvexity =

Mathematical concept

In mathematics, more precisely in the theory of functions of several complex variables, a pseudoconvex set is a special type of open set in the n-dimensional complex space C^{n}. Pseudoconvex sets are important, as they allow for classification of domains of holomorphy.

Let $G\subset {\mathbb{C}}^n$ be a domain. One says that $G$ is pseudoconvex (or Hartogs pseudoconvex) if there exists a continuous plurisubharmonic function $\varphi$ on $G$ such that the set $\{ z \in G \mid \varphi(z) < x \}$ is a relatively compact subset of $G$ for all real numbers $x.$ In other words, a domain is pseudoconvex if $G$ has a continuous plurisubharmonic exhaustion function. Every (geometrically) convex set is pseudoconvex. However, there are pseudoconvex domains which are not geometrically convex.

When $G$ has a $C^2$ (twice continuously differentiable) boundary, this notion is the same as Levi pseudoconvexity, which is easier to work with. More specifically, with a $C^2$ boundary, it can be shown that $G$ has a defining function, i.e., that there exists $\rho: \mathbb{C}^n \to \mathbb{R}$ which is $C^2$ so that $G=\{\rho <0 \}$, and $\partial G =\{\rho =0\}$. Now, $G$ is pseudoconvex if and only if for every $p \in \partial G$ and $w$ in the complex tangent space at p, that is,

$\nabla \rho(p) w = \sum_{i=1}^n \frac{\partial \rho (p)}{ \partial z_j }w_j =0$, we have
$$\sum_{i,j=1}^n \frac{\partial^2 \rho(p)}{\partial z_i \partial \bar{z_j} } w_i \bar{w_j} \geq 0.$$

The definition above is analogous to definitions of convexity in Real Analysis.

If $G$ does not have a $C^2$ boundary, the following approximation result can be useful.

Proposition 1 If $G$ is pseudoconvex, then there exist bounded, strongly Levi pseudoconvex domains $G_k \subset G$ with $C^\infty$ (smooth) boundary which are relatively compact in $G$, such that

$$G = \bigcup_{k=1}^\infty G_k.$$

This is because once we have a $\varphi$ as in the definition we can actually find a C^{∞} exhaustion function.

== The case n = 1 ==
In one complex dimension, every open domain is pseudoconvex.

== See also ==
- Analytic polyhedron
- Eugenio Elia Levi
- Holomorphically convex hull
- Stein manifold
