= Weierstrass preparation theorem =

Local theory of several complex variables

In mathematics, the Weierstrass preparation theorem is a tool for dealing with analytic functions of several complex variables, at a given point P. It states that such a function is, up to multiplication by a function not zero at P, a polynomial in one fixed variable z, which is monic, and whose coefficients of lower degree terms are analytic functions in the remaining variables and zero at P.

There are also a number of variants of the theorem, that extend the idea of factorization in some ring R as u·w, where u is a unit and w is some sort of distinguished Weierstrass polynomial. Carl Siegel has disputed the attribution of the theorem to Weierstrass, saying that it occurred under the current name in some of late nineteenth century Traités d'analyse without justification.

== Complex analytic functions ==
For one variable, the local form of an analytic function f(z) near 0 is z^{k}h(z) where h(0) is not 0, and k is the order of the zero of f at 0. This is the result that the preparation theorem generalises. We pick out one variable z, which we may assume is first, and write our complex variables as (z, z_{2}, ..., z_{n}). A Weierstrass polynomial W(z) is

z^{k} + g_{k−1}z^{k−1} + ... + g_{0}

where g_{i}(z_{2}, ..., z_{n}) is analytic and g_{i}(0, ..., 0) = 0.

Then the theorem states that for analytic functions f, if

f(0, ...,0) = 0,

and

f(z, z_{2}, ..., z_{n})

as a power series has some term only involving z, we can write (locally near (0, ..., 0))

f(z, z_{2}, ..., z_{n}) = W(z)h(z, z_{2}, ..., z_{n})

with h analytic and h(0, ..., 0) not 0, and W a Weierstrass polynomial.

This has the immediate consequence that the set of zeros of f, near (0, ..., 0), can be found by fixing any small values of z_{2}, ..., z_{n} and then solving the equation W(z)=0. The corresponding values of z form a number of continuously-varying branches, in number equal to the degree of W in z. In particular f cannot have an isolated zero.

=== Division theorem ===
A related result is the Weierstrass division theorem, which states that if f and g are analytic functions, and g is a Weierstrass polynomial of degree N, then there exists a unique pair h and j such that f = gh + j, where j is a polynomial of degree less than N. In fact, many authors prove the Weierstrass preparation as a corollary of the division theorem. It is also possible to prove the division theorem from the preparation theorem so that the two theorems are actually equivalent.

=== Applications ===
The Weierstrass preparation theorem can be used to show that the ring of germs of analytic functions in n variables is a Noetherian ring, which is also referred to as the Rückert basis theorem.

== Smooth functions ==
There is a deeper preparation theorem for smooth functions, due to Bernard Malgrange, called the Malgrange preparation theorem. It also has an associated division theorem, named after John Mather.

== Formal power series in complete local rings ==
There is an analogous result, also referred to as the Weierstrass preparation theorem, for the ring of formal power series over complete local rings A: for any power series $f = \sum_{n=0}^\infty a_n t^n \in A[[t]]$ such that not all $a_n$ are in the maximal ideal $\mathfrak m$ of A, there is a unique unit u in $A[[t]]$ and a polynomial F of the form $F=t^s + b_{s-1} t^{s-1} + \dots + b_0$ with $b_i \in \mathfrak m$ (a so-called distinguished polynomial) such that

$$f = uF.$$

Since $A[[t]]$ is again a complete local ring, the result can be iterated and therefore gives similar factorization results for formal power series in several variables.

For example, this applies to the ring of integers in a p-adic field. In this case the theorem says that a power series f(z) can always be uniquely factored as π^{n}·u(z)·p(z), where u(z) is a unit in the ring of power series, p(z) is a distinguished polynomial (monic, with the coefficients of the non-leading terms each in the maximal ideal), and π is a fixed uniformizer.

An application of the Weierstrass preparation and division theorem for the ring $\mathbf Z_p[[t]]$ (also called Iwasawa algebra) occurs in Iwasawa theory in the description of finitely generated modules over this ring.

There exists a non-commutative version of Weierstrass division and preparation, with A being a not necessarily commutative ring, and with formal skew power series in place of formal power series.

== Tate algebras ==
There is also a Weierstrass preparation theorem for Tate algebras

$$T_n(k) = \left  \{ \sum_{\nu_1, \dots, \nu_n \ge 0} a_{\nu_1, \dots, \nu_n} X_1^{\nu_1} \cdots X_n^{\nu_n}, |a_{\nu_1, \dots, \nu_n}| \to 0 \text{ for } \nu_1 + \dots +\nu_n \to \infty \right \}$$

over a complete non-archimedean field k. These algebras are the basic building blocks of rigid geometry. One application of this form of the Weierstrass preparation theorem is the fact that the rings $T_n(k)$ are Noetherian.

== See also ==
- Oka coherence theorem
