= Helmut Röhrl =

German mathematician

Helmut Röhrl or Rohrl (born 22 March 1927 in Straubing, died 30 January 2014) was a German mathematician.

Besides complex analysis (including among other subjects the Riemann–Hilbert problem), he worked on algebra and category theory and totally convex spaces. In 1964, he edited the new edition of the classic textbook on complex analysis by Adolf Hurwitz and Richard Courant.

Röhrl received his doctorate in 1949 at the Ludwig-Maximilians-Universität München (now LMU Munich) under Robert König (and Oskar Perron) with doctoral thesis Über Differentialsysteme, welche aus multiplikativen Klassen mit exponentiellen Singularitäten entspringen and his habilitation in 1953 with habilitation thesis Abelsche Integrale auf Riemannschen Flächen endlichen Geschlechts. He was a docent in mathematics from 1949 to 1951 at the University of Würzburg, from 1951 to 1953 at Ludwig-Maximilians-Universität München, from 1953 to 1955 at the University of Münster under Heinrich Behnke and from 1955 to 1958 again at Ludwig-Maximilians-Universität München. In the academic year from 1958 to 1959, he was at the University of Chicago, became in 1959 an associate professor and subsequently professor at the University of Minnesota and was from 1964 a professor at the University of California, San Diego.

In the academic year from 1962 to 1963, Röhrl was a visiting professor at Harvard University, from 1967 to 1968 at Princeton University, from 1972 to 1973 at LMU Munich, and at the University of Fribourg, the FernUniversität Hagen, the University of Göttingen, and the Technical University of Munich, and in 1976 at the University of Nagoya.

== Works ==
- Das Riemann-Hilbert’sche Problem der linearen Differentialgleichungen, Mathematische Annalen, vol. 133, 1957, pp. 1–25.
- as annotator and editor: Adolf Hurwitz, Richard Courant Lehrbuch der Funktionentheorie, Springer Verlag, 4th edn. 1964
  - annotations (pp. 551–696) forming two new chapters: Weitere Abbildungstheoreme der Funktionentheorie (including quasiconformal mappings) and Holomorphe und meromorphe Funktionen auf Riemannschen Flächen (including the Riemann–Roch theorem, Runge approximation theorem, topology and vector bundles on Riemann surfaces, and automorphe functions)
- Röhrl, Helmut (1962). "Holomorphic fiber bundles over Riemann surfaces". Bulletin of the AMS. 68 (3): 125–160. doi:10.1090/S0002-9904-1962-10715-0. MR 0146854.
- with Dieter Pumplün: Banach spaces and totally convex spaces, parts 1, 2, Comm. in Algebra, vol. 12, 1984, pp. 935–1019; vol. 13, 1985, pp. 1047–1113

== See also ==
- Function of several complex variables
- Hilbert's twenty-first problem
