= Behnke–Stein theorem =

Theorem in mathematics about unions of domains of holomorphy

In mathematics, especially several complex variables, the Behnke–Stein theorem states that a union of an increasing sequence $G_k \subset \mathbb{C}^n$ (i.e., $G_k \subset G_{k + 1}$) of domains of holomorphy is again a domain of holomorphy. It was proved by Heinrich Behnke and Karl Stein in 1938.

This is related to the fact that an increasing union of pseudoconvex domains is pseudoconvex and so it can be proven using that fact and the solution of the Levi problem. Though historically this theorem was in fact used to solve the Levi problem, and the theorem itself was proved using the Oka–Weil theorem. This theorem again holds for Stein manifolds, but it is not known if it holds for Stein space.
