= Holomorphic separability =

In mathematics in complex analysis, the concept of holomorphic separability is a measure of the richness of the set of holomorphic functions on a complex manifold or complex-analytic space.

== Formal definition ==
A complex manifold or complex space $X$ is said to be holomorphically separable, if whenever x ≠ y are two points in $X$, there exists a holomorphic function $f \in \mathcal O(X)$, such that f(x) ≠ f(y).

Often one says the holomorphic functions separate points.

== Usage and examples ==
- All complex manifolds that can be mapped injectively into some $\mathbb{C}^n$ are holomorphically separable, in particular, all domains in $\mathbb{C}^n$ and all Stein manifolds.
- A holomorphically separable complex manifold is not compact unless it is discrete and finite.
- The condition is part of the definition of a Stein manifold.
