= Cartan's theorems A and B =

Coherent sheaf on a Stein manifold is spanned by sections & lacks higher cohomology

In mathematics, Cartan's theorems A and B are two results proved by Henri Cartan around 1951, concerning a coherent sheaf F on a Stein manifold X. They are significant both as applied to several complex variables, and in the general development of sheaf cohomology.

Theorem A—F is spanned by its global sections.

Theorem B is stated in cohomological terms (a formulation that Cartan (1953, p. 51) attributes to J.-P. Serre):

Theorem B—H^{p}(X, F) = 0 for all p > 0.

Analogous properties were established by Serre (1957) for coherent sheaves in algebraic geometry, when X is an affine scheme. The analogue of Theorem B in this context is as follows (Hartshorne 1977, Theorem III.3.7):

Theorem B (Scheme theoretic analogue)—Let X be an affine scheme, F a quasi-coherent sheaf of O_{X}-modules for the Zariski topology on X. Then H^{p}(X, F) = 0 for all p > 0.

These theorems have many important applications. For instance, they imply that a holomorphic function on a closed complex submanifold, Z, of a Stein manifold X can be extended to a holomorphic function on all of X. At a deeper level, these theorems were used by Jean-Pierre Serre to prove the GAGA theorem.

Theorem B is sharp in the sense that if H^{1}(X, F) = 0 for all coherent sheaves F on a complex manifold X (resp. quasi-coherent sheaves F on a noetherian scheme X), then X is Stein (resp. affine); see (Serre 1956) (resp. (Serre 1957) and (Hartshorne 1977, Theorem III.3.7)).

== See also ==
- Cousin problems
