= Kodaira embedding theorem =

Characterises non-singular projective varieties amongst compact Kähler manifolds

In mathematics, the Kodaira embedding theorem characterises non-singular projective varieties, over the complex numbers, amongst compact Kähler manifolds. In effect it says precisely which complex manifolds are defined by homogeneous polynomials.

Kunihiko Kodaira's result is that for a compact Kähler manifold M, with a Hodge metric, meaning that the cohomology class in degree 2 defined by the Kähler form ω is an integral cohomology class, there is a complex-analytic embedding of M into complex projective space of some high enough dimension N. The fact that M embeds as an algebraic variety follows from its compactness by Chow's theorem. A Kähler manifold with a Hodge metric is occasionally called a Hodge manifold (named after W. V. D. Hodge), so Kodaira's results states that Hodge manifolds are projective. The converse that projective manifolds are Hodge manifolds is more elementary and was already known.

Kodaira also proved (Kodaira 1963), by recourse to the classification of compact complex surfaces, that every compact Kähler surface is a deformation of a projective Kähler surface. This was later simplified by Buchdahl to remove reliance on the classification (Buchdahl 2008).

== Kodaira embedding theorem ==
Let X be a compact Kähler manifold, and L a holomorphic line bundle on X. Then L is a positive line bundle if and only if there is a holomorphic embedding $\varphi:X\rightarrow \mathbb{P}^N$ of X into some projective space such that $\varphi^*\mathcal O_{\mathbb{P}^N}(1)=L^{\otimes m}$ for some m > 0.

== See also ==
- Fujita conjecture
- Hodge structure
- Moishezon manifold
