= Raghavan Narasimhan =

Indian mathematician (1937–2015)

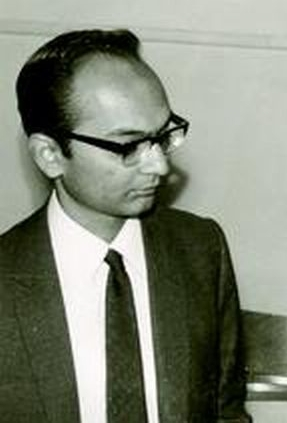
- Born: August 31, 1937; Madras
- Died: October 3, 2015 (aged 78); Chicago
- Education: Loyola College, Chennai; Bombay University

Raghavan Narasimhan (August 31, 1937–October 3, 2015) was an Indian mathematician at the University of Chicago who worked on real and complex manifolds and who solved the Levi problem for complex manifolds.

== Early life and education ==
He attended Loyola College in Madras, where, like many other well-known Indian mathematicians, he was taught by the French Jesuit priest Racine, and received his doctorate in 1963 from K. Chandrasekharan in Bombay. In 1966 he was at the Institute for Advanced Study at Princeton. Narasimhan was a professor at the University of Chicago.
