= Eugenio Elia Levi =

Italian mathematician (1883–1917)

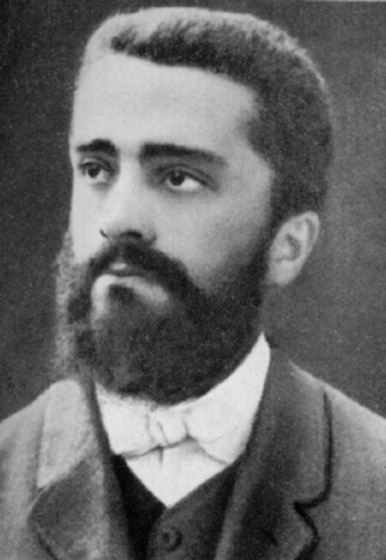
- Born: 18 October 1883; Turin, Italy
- Died: 28 October 1917 (aged 34); Cormons, Italy
- Education: Scuola Normale Superiore
- Known for: Levi decomposition; Levi form; Parametrix; Pseudoconvexity
- Awards: Lavagna prize (1904); Golden medal of the Accademia Nazionale delle Scienze detta dei XL (1911)
- Scientific career
- Fields: Group theory; Several complex variables; Partial differential operators
- Workplaces: Scuola Normale Superiore; University of Genoa

Eugenio Elia Levi (18 October 1883 – 28 October 1917) was an Italian mathematician. He is known for his fundamental contributions in group theory, in the theory of partial differential operators and in the theory of functions of several complex variables. He was a younger brother of Beppo Levi and was killed in action during First World War.

== Work ==
=== Research activity ===
He wrote 33 papers, classified by his colleague and friend Mauro Picone (Note: This section is mainly based on the survey article by Picone (1959) included in Levi's "Opere (Collected works)", describing his researches briefly but comprehensively; occasionally, also the comments of Guido Fubini in (Fubini & Loria 1918) are taken into account.) according to the scheme reproduced in this section.

==== Group theory ====
He wrote only three papers in group theory: in the first one, Levi (1905) discovered what is now called Levi decomposition, which was conjectured by Wilhelm Killing and proved by Élie Cartan in a special case.

==== Function theory ====
In the theory of functions of several complex variables he introduced the concept of pseudoconvexity (Note: See the two well known papers (Levi 1910) and (Levi 1910): Levi deals with functions of two complex variables, but his calculations can be extended to functions with any finite number of variables, as he explicitly states. Levi, following a then well established practice, does not use Wirtinger derivatives.) during his investigations on the domain of existence of such functions: it turned out to be one of the key concepts of the theory.

==== Boundary value problems ====
His researches in the theory of partial differential operators lead to the method of the parametrix, which is basically a way to construct fundamental solutions for elliptic partial differential operators with variable coefficients: the parametrix is widely used in the theory of pseudodifferential operators.

== Publications ==
The full scientific production of Eugenio Elia Levi is collected in reference (Levi 1959–1960).

- Levi, Eugenio Elia (2 April 1905), "Sulla struttura dei gruppi finiti e continui" [On the structure of finite simple groups], Atti della Reale Accademia delle Scienze di Torino. (in Italian), XL: 551–565, JFM 36.0217.02, reprinted also in Levi 1959–1960, pp. 101–126, volume I. A a well-known memoir in Group theory: it was presented to the members of the Accademia delle Scienze di Torino during the session of April 2, 1905, by Luigi Bianchi.
- Levi, Eugenio Elia (1907a), "Sulle equazioni lineari alle derivate parziali totalmente ellittiche" [On linear totally elliptic partial differential equations], Rendiconti della Reale Accademia dei Lincei, Classe di Scienze Fisiche, Matematiche, Naturali, Serie V (in Italian), 16 (1): 932–938, JFM 38.0403.01. A short note announcing the results of paper (Levi 1907b).
- Levi, Eugenio Elia (1907b), "Sulle equazioni lineari totalmente ellittiche alle derivate parziali" [On linear totally elliptic partial differential equations], Rendiconti del Circolo Matematico di Palermo (in Italian), 24 (1): 275–317, doi:10.1007/BF03015067, JFM 38.0402.01. An important paper whose results were previously announced in the short note (Levi 1907a) with the same title. It was also translated in Russian by N. D. Ajzenstat, currently available from the All-Russian Mathematical Portal: Levi, E. E. (1941), "On linear elliptic partial differential equations", Uspekhi Matematicheskikh Nauk (in Russian) (8): 249–292.
- Levi, Eugenio Elia (1910), "Studii sui punti singolari essenziali delle funzioni analitiche di due o più variabili complesse" [Studies on essential singular points of analytic functions of two or more complex variables], Annali di Matematica Pura ed Applicata, s. III (in Italian), XVII (1): 61–87, doi:10.1007/BF02419336, JFM 41.0487.01. An important paper in the theory of functions of several complex variables, where the problem of determining what kind of hypersurface can be the boundary of a domain of holomorphy.
- Levi, Eugenio Elia (1911), "Sulle ipersuperficie dello spazio a 4 dimensioni che possono essere frontiera del campo di esistenza di una funzione analitica di due variabili complesse" [On the hypersurfaces of the 4-dimensional space that can be the boundary of the domain of existence of an analytic function of two complex variables], Annali di Matematica Pura ed Applicata, s. III (in Italian), XVIII (1): 69–79, doi:10.1007/BF02420535, JFM 42.0449.02. Another important paper in the theory of functions of several complex variables, investigating further the theory started in (Levi 1910).
- Levi, Eugenio Elia (1959–1960), Opere [Collected works] (in Italian), Roma: Edizioni Cremonese (distributed by Unione Matematica Italiana), pp. XX + 418 (Volume I), 448 (Volume II), MR 0123464, Zbl 0091.00108. His "Collected works" in two volumes, collecting all the mathematical papers of Eugenio Elia Levi in a revised typographical form, both amending typographical errors and author's oversights. A collection of all his published papers (in their original typographical form), probably an unordered uncorrected collection of offprints, is available online at the Internet Archive: Levi, Eugenio Elia, Mathematical papers, Los Angeles: UCLA, p. 782, archived from the original on 9 August 2016.

== See also ==
- Pseudoconvexity
- Levi decomposition
- Parametrix
- Several complex variables
