= Oka–Weil theorem =

Uniform approximation theorem in mathematics

In mathematics, especially the theory of several complex variables, the Oka–Weil theorem is a result about the uniform convergence of holomorphic functions on Stein spaces due to Kiyoshi Oka and André Weil.

== Statement ==
The Oka–Weil theorem states that if X is a Stein space and K is a compact $\mathcal{O}(X)$-convex subset of X, then every holomorphic function in an open neighborhood of K can be approximated uniformly on K by holomorphic functions on $\mathcal{O}(X)$ (in particular, by polynomials).

== Applications ==
Since Runge's theorem may not hold for several complex variables, the Oka–Weil theorem is often used as an approximation theorem for several complex variables. The Behnke–Stein theorem was originally proved using the Oka–Weil theorem.

== See also ==
- Oka coherence theorem

== Bibliography ==
- Jorge, Mujica (1977–1978). "The Oka–Weil theorem in locally convex spaces with the approximation property". Séminaire Paul Krée Tome 4: 1–7. Zbl 0401.46024.
- Noguchi, Junjiro (2019), "A Weak Coherence Theorem and Remarks to the Oka Theory" (PDF), Kodai Math. J., 42 (3): 566–586, arXiv:1704.07726, doi:10.2996/kmj/1572487232, S2CID 119697608
- Oka, Kiyoshi (1937). "Sur les fonctions analytiques de plusieurs variables. II–Domaines d'holomorphie". Journal of Science of the Hiroshima University, Series A. 7: 115–130. doi:10.32917/hmj/1558576819.
- Remmert, Reinhold (1956). "Sur les espaces analytiques holomorphiquement séparables et holomorphiquement convexes". Comptes Rendus Hebdomadaires des Séances de l'Académie des Sciences de Paris (in French). 243: 118–121. Zbl 0070.30401.
- Weil, André (1935). "L'intégrale de Cauchy et les fonctions de plusieurs variables". Mathematische Annalen. 111: 178–182. doi:10.1007/BF01472212. S2CID 120807854.
- Wermer, John (1976). "The Oka—Weil Theorem". Banach Algebras and Several Complex Variables. Graduate Texts in Mathematics. Vol. 35. pp. 36–42. doi:10.1007/978-1-4757-3878-0_7. ISBN 978-1-4757-3880-3.
