= Ambient space (mathematics) =

Space surrounding an object

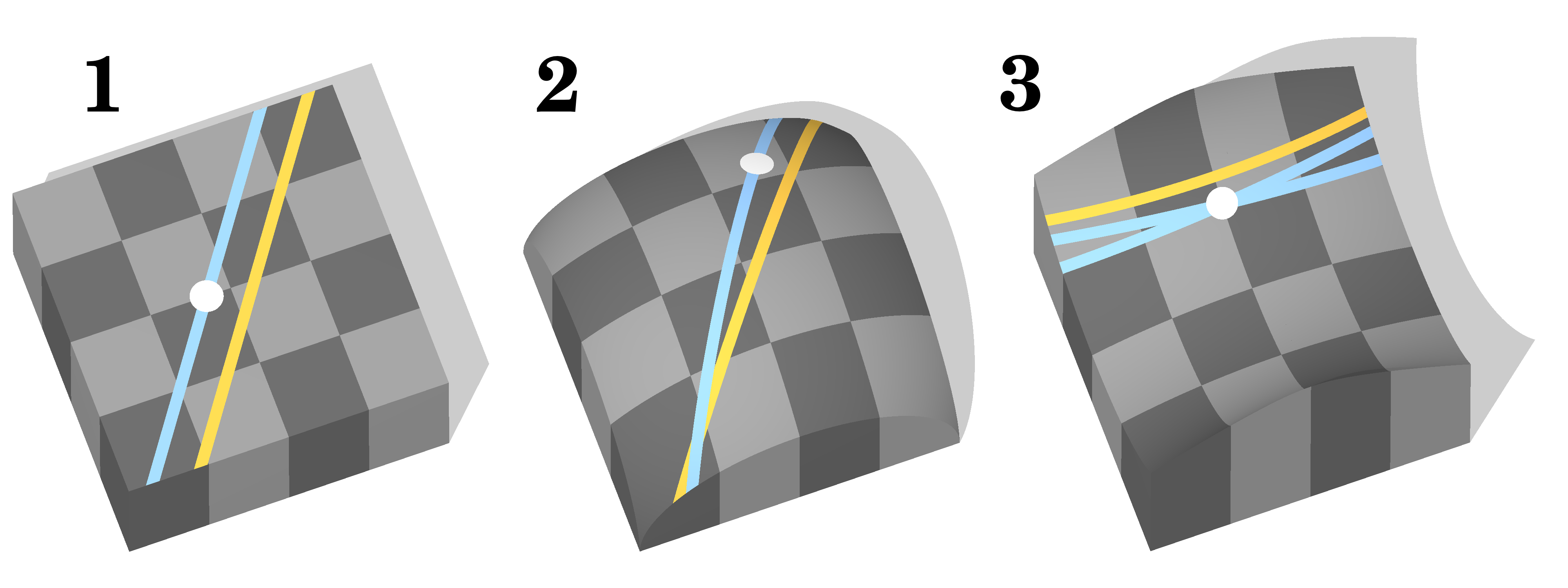
Three examples of different geometries: Euclidean, elliptical, and hyperbolic

In mathematics, especially in geometry and topology, an ambient space is the space surrounding a mathematical object along with the object itself.

For example, a circle $c$ may be studied in isolation, in which case the ambient space of $c$ is the circle itself, or it may be studied as an object embedded in the Euclidean plane $\mathcal{E}^2$, in which case the ambient space of $c$ is $\mathcal{E}^2$, or as an object embedded in the hyperbolic plane $\mathcal{H}^2$, in which case the ambient space of $c$ is $\mathcal{H}^2$. To see why this makes a difference, consider the statement "the ratio of a circle's circumference to its diameter is the constant $\pi \approx 3.14$." This is true if the ambient space is $\mathcal{E}^2$, but false if the ambient space is $\mathcal{H}^2$, because the geometric properties of $\mathcal{E}^2$ are different from the geometric properties of $\mathcal{E}^2$. All spaces are subsets of their ambient space.

== See also ==
- Configuration space
- Geometric space
- Manifold and ambient manifold
- Submanifolds and Hypersurfaces
- Abstract variety and Projective embedding
