= Runge's theorem =

Theorem in complex analysis

Given a holomorphic function f on the blue compact set and a point in each of the holes, one can approximate f as well as desired by rational functions having poles only at those three points.

In complex analysis, Runge's theorem (also known as Runge's approximation theorem) is named after the German mathematician Carl Runge who first proved it in 1885. It states the following:

Denoting by C the set of complex numbers, let K be a closed subset of $\mathbb C \cup\{\infty\}$ and let f be a function which is holomorphic on an open set containing K. If A is a set containing at least one complex number from every connected component of $\mathbb C \cup\{\infty\} \setminus K$, then there exists a sequence $(r_n)_{n\in\N}$ of rational functions which converges uniformly to f on K and such that all the poles of the functions $(r_n)_{n\in\N}$ are in A.

Note that not every complex number in A needs to be a pole of every rational function of the sequence $(r_n)_{n\in\N}$. We merely know that for all members of $(r_n)_{n\in\N}$ that do have poles, those poles lie in A.

One aspect that makes this theorem so powerful is that one can choose the set A arbitrarily. In other words, one can choose any complex numbers from the bounded connected components of $\mathbb C \cup\{\infty\} \setminus K$ and the theorem guarantees the existence of a sequence of rational functions with poles only amongst those chosen numbers.

For the special case in which K is a compact subset of $\mathbb C$ and $\mathbb C \setminus K$ is a connected set one can pick $A = \{\infty\}$. Since rational functions with no poles except at infinity are simply polynomials, we get the following corollary: If K is a compact subset of C such that C\K is a connected set, and f is a holomorphic function on an open set containing K, then there exists a sequence of polynomials $(p_n)$ that approaches f uniformly on K.

== Sketch of proof ==
An elementary proof, inspired by Sarason (1998), proceeds as follows. There is a closed piecewise-linear contour Γ in the open set, containing K in its interior, such that all the chosen distinguished points are in its exterior. By Cauchy's integral formula

$$f(w)={1\over 2\pi i} \int_\Gamma {f(z) \, dz\over z-w}$$

for w in K. Riemann approximating sums can be used to approximate the contour integral uniformly over K (there is a similar formula for the derivative). Each term in the sum is a scalar multiple of (z − w)^{−1} for some point z on the contour. This gives a uniform approximation by a rational function with poles on Γ.

To modify this to an approximation with poles at specified points in each component of the complement of K, it is enough to check this for terms of the form (z − w)^{−1}. If z_{0} is the point in the same component as z, take a path from z to z_{0}.

If two points are sufficiently close on the path, we may use the formula

$\frac{1}{z - z_0} = \frac{1}{z - w_0} \sum_{n=0}^\infty \left( \frac{z_0 - w_0}{z - w_0} \right)^n$ (verified by geometric series)

valid on the circle-complement $|z_0 - w_0| < |z - w|$; note that the chosen path has a positive distance to K by compactness. That series can be truncated to give a rational function with poles only at the second point uniformly close to the original function on K. Proceeding by steps along the path from z to z_{0} the original function (z − w)^{−1} can be successively modified to give a rational function with poles only at z_{0}.

If z_{0} is the point at infinity, then by the above procedure the rational function (z − w)^{−1} can first be approximated by a rational function g with poles at R > 0 where R is so large that K lies in w < R. The Taylor series expansion of g about 0 can then be truncated to give a polynomial approximation on K.

== Generalizations ==
When $K$ is a compact subset of the complex plane $\mathbb C$ such that $\mathbb C \setminus K$ is connected, Mergelyan's theorem relaxes the condition on $f$. Instead of requiring $f$ to be holomorphic on an open set containing $K$, it only requires $f$ to be continuous on $K$, and holomorphic on the interior of $K$.

Runge's theorem generalizes to Riemann surfaces.

Theorem—If $K$ is a compact set in a Riemann surface $X$, then every holomorphic function $f$ on a neighborhood of $K$ can be approximated uniformly on $K$ by meromorphic functions $F$ on $X$ without poles in $K$, and by holomorphic functions on $X$ if $X \backslash K$ has no connected components relatively compact in $X$.

The original Runge's theorem is obtained by setting $X = \mathbb C \cup\{\infty\} \setminus A$, where $A$ contains one element per connected component of $\mathbb C \cup\{\infty\} \setminus K$.

For functions of several complex variables, a naive generalization of Runge's theorem is false. Further restrictions are necessary to make analogous theorems that are true. One generalization is the Oka–Weil theorem.

=== Runge domain ===
We say that an open subset $U$ of $X$ is a Runge subset if any holomorphic function on $U$ is the limit of a sequence of global holomorphic functions on $X$ in the compact-open topology.

== See also ==
- Mergelyan's theorem
- Oka–Weil theorem
- Behnke–Stein theorem on Stein manifolds
