= Domain of holomorphy =

Concept in complex analysis

The sets in the definition.

In mathematics, in the theory of functions of several complex variables, a domain of holomorphy is a domain that is maximal in the sense that there exists a holomorphic function on this domain that cannot be extended to a bigger domain.

Formally, an open set $\Omega$ in the $n$-dimensional complex space ${\mathbb{C}}^n$ is called a domain of holomorphy if there do not exist non-empty open sets $U \subset \Omega$ and $V \subset {\mathbb{C}}^n$ where $V$ is connected, $V \not\subset \Omega$ and $U \subset \Omega \cap V$ such that for every holomorphic function $f$ on $\Omega$, there exists a holomorphic function $g$ on $V$ with $f = g$ on $U$.

Equivalently, for any such $U$ and $V$, there exists a holomorphic $f$ on $\Omega$, such that $f|_U$ cannot be analytically continued to $V$.

In the case $n=1$, every open set is a domain of holomorphy: we can define a holomorphic function that is not identically zero, but whose zeros accumulate everywhere on the boundary of the domain, which must then be a natural boundary for a domain of definition of its reciprocal. For $n \geq 2$ this is no longer true, as it follows from Hartogs's extension theorem.

== Equivalent conditions ==
For a domain $\Omega$ the following conditions are equivalent:

1. $\Omega$ is a domain of holomorphy.
2. $\Omega$ is holomorphically convex.
3. There exists a function holomorphic on $\Omega$ that cannot be analytically continued beyond $\Omega$. That is, its domain of existence is $\Omega$.
4. $\Omega$ is pseudoconvex.
5. $\Omega$ is Levi convex – for every sequence $S_{n} \subseteq \Omega$ of analytic compact surfaces such that $S_{n} \rightarrow S, \partial S_{n} \rightarrow \Gamma$ for some set $\Gamma$ we have $S \subseteq \Omega$ ($\partial \Omega$ cannot be "touched from inside" by a sequence of analytic surfaces).
6. $\Omega$ has local Levi property – for every point $x \in \partial \Omega$ there exists a neighbourhood $U$ of $x$ and $f$ holomorphic on $U \cap \Omega$ such that $f$ cannot be extended to any neighbourhood of $x$

Implications $1 \Leftrightarrow 2 \Leftrightarrow 3, 4 \Leftrightarrow 5, 1 \Rightarrow 5, 4 \Rightarrow 6$ are standard results (for $1\Rightarrow 4$, see Oka's lemma). The equivalence of 1, 2, 3 is the Cartan–Thullen theorem. The main difficulty lies in proving $6 \Rightarrow 1$, i.e. constructing a global holomorphic function that admits no extension from non-extendable functions defined only locally. This is called the Levi problem (after E. E. Levi) and was first solved by Kiyoshi Oka, and then by Lars Hörmander using methods from functional analysis and partial differential equations (a consequence of $\bar{\partial}$-problem).

== Properties ==
- If $\Omega_1, \dots, \Omega_{n}$ are domains of holomorphy, then their intersection $\textstyle \Omega = \bigcap_{j=1}^{n} \Omega_j$ is also a domain of holomorphy.
- If $\Omega_{1} \subseteq \Omega_{2} \subseteq \dots$ is an ascending sequence of domains of holomorphy, then their union $\textstyle \Omega = \bigcup_{n=1}^{\infty}\Omega_{n}$ is also a domain of holomorphy (see Behnke–Stein theorem).
- If $\Omega_{1}$ and $\Omega_{2}$ are domains of holomorphy, then $\Omega_{1} \times \Omega_{2}$ is a domain of holomorphy.
- The first Cousin problem is always solvable in a domain of holomorphy; this is also true, with additional topological assumptions, for the second Cousin problem.

== Examples ==
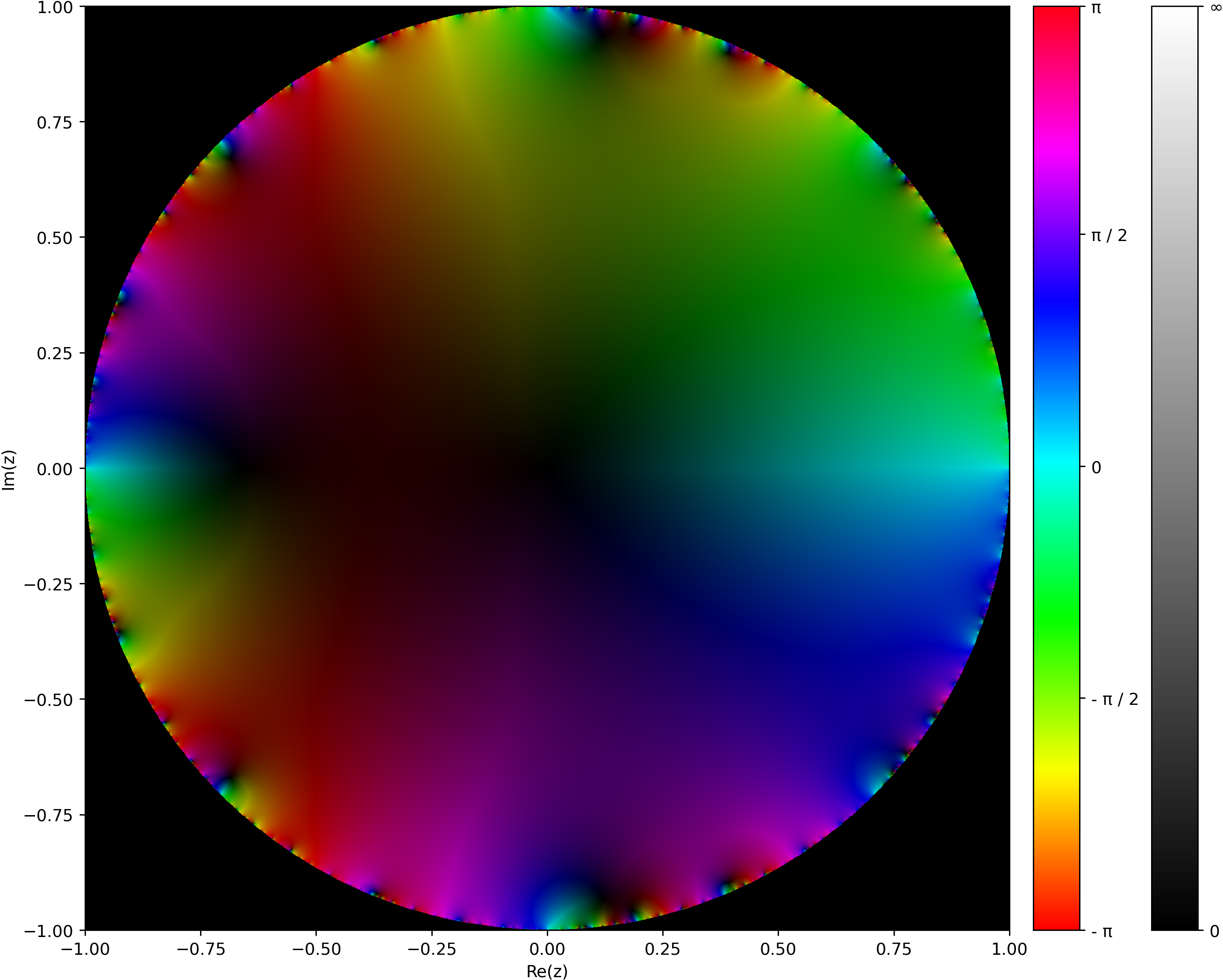
Domain coloring of the 128th partial sum of the lacunary function $\textstyle \sum_{n=0}^\infty z^{2^n}$

${\mathbb{C}}^n$ is trivially a domain of holomorphy.

In the $n=1$ case, every open set is a domain of holomorphy. A particular example is the open unit disk. Define the lacunary function $\textstyle \sum_{n=0}^\infty z^{2^n}$.

it is holomorphic on the open unit disk by the Weierstrass M-test, and singular at all $\{e^{2i\pi k/2^n} : n, k \in \N\}$, which is dense on the unit circle, and therefore it cannot be analytically extended beyond the unit disk.

In the $n \geq 2$ case, let $K \subset U \subset \mathbb C^n$ where $U$ is open and $K$ is nonempty and compact. If $U \setminus K$ is connected, then by the Hartogs's extension theorem, any function holomorphic on $U \setminus K$ can be analytically continued to $U$, which means $U \setminus K$ is an open set that is not a domain of holomorphy. Thus, domain of holomorphy becomes a nontrivial concept in the case $n \geq 2$.

== See also ==
- Behnke–Stein theorem
- Levi pseudoconvex
- Stein manifold
