= Positive form =

In complex geometry, the term positive form refers to several classes of real differential forms of Hodge type (p, p).

== (1,1)-forms ==
Real (p,p)-forms on a complex manifold M are forms which are of type (p,p) and real, that is, lie in the intersection $\Lambda^{p,p}(M)\cap \Lambda^{2p}(M,{\mathbb R}).$ A real (1,1)-form $\omega$ is called semi-positive (sometimes just positive), respectively, positive (or positive definite) if any of the following equivalent conditions holds:

1. $-\omega$ is the imaginary part of a positive semidefinite (respectively, positive definite) Hermitian form.
2. For some basis $dz_1, ... dz_n$ in the space $\Lambda^{1,0}M$ of (1,0)-forms, $\omega$ can be written diagonally, as $\omega = \sqrt{-1} \sum_i \alpha_i dz_i\wedge d\bar z_i,$ with $\alpha_i$ real and non-negative (respectively, positive).
3. For any (1,0)-tangent vector $v\in T^{1,0}M$, $-\sqrt{-1}\omega(v, \bar v) \geq 0$ (respectively, $>0$).
4. For any real tangent vector $v\in TM$, $\omega(v, I(v)) \geq 0$ (respectively, $>0$), where $I:\; TM\mapsto TM$ is the complex structure operator.

== Positive line bundles ==
In algebraic geometry, positive definite (1,1)-forms arise as curvature forms of ample line bundles (also known as positive line bundles). Let L be a holomorphic Hermitian line bundle on a complex manifold,

$$\bar\partial:\; L\mapsto L\otimes \Lambda^{0,1}(M)$$

its complex structure operator. Then L is equipped with a unique connection preserving the Hermitian structure and satisfying

$$\nabla^{0,1}=\bar\partial$$.

This connection is called the Chern connection.

The curvature $\Theta$ of the Chern connection is always a purely imaginary (1,1)-form. A line bundle L is called positive if $\sqrt{-1}\Theta$ is a positive (1,1)-form. (Note that the de Rham cohomology class of $\sqrt{-1}\Theta$ is $2\pi$ times the first Chern class of L.) The Kodaira embedding theorem claims that a positive line bundle is ample, and conversely, any ample line bundle admits a Hermitian metric with $\sqrt{-1}\Theta$ positive.

== Positivity for (p, p)-forms ==
Semi-positive (1,1)-forms on M form a convex cone. When M is a compact complex surface, $dim_{\mathbb C}M=2$, this cone is self-dual, with respect to the Poincaré pairing :$\eta, \zeta \mapsto \int_M \eta\wedge\zeta$

For (p, p)-forms, where $2\leq p \leq dim_{\mathbb C}M-2$, there are two different notions of positivity. A form is called strongly positive if it is a linear combination of products of semi-positive forms, with positive real coefficients. A real (p, p)-form $\eta$ on an n-dimensional complex manifold M is called weakly positive if for all strongly positive (n-p, n-p)-forms ζ with compact support, we have $\int_M \eta\wedge\zeta\geq 0$.

Weakly positive and strongly positive forms form convex cones. On compact manifolds these cones are dual with respect to the Poincaré pairing.
