= Algebraic geometry and analytic geometry =

Two closely related mathematical subjects

In mathematics, algebraic geometry and analytic geometry are two closely related subjects. While algebraic geometry studies algebraic varieties, analytic geometry deals with complex manifolds and the more general analytic spaces defined locally by the vanishing of analytic functions of several complex variables. The deep relation between these subjects has numerous applications in which algebraic techniques are applied to analytic spaces and analytic techniques to algebraic varieties.

== Main statement ==
Let $X$ be a projective complex algebraic variety. Because $X$ is a complex variety, its set of complex points $X(\C)$ can be given the structure of a compact complex analytic space. This analytic space is denoted $X^\mathrm{an}$. Similarly, if $\mathcal{F}$ is a sheaf on $X$, then there is a corresponding sheaf $\mathcal{F}^\text{an}$ on $X^\mathrm{an}$. This association of an analytic object to an algebraic one is a functor. The prototypical theorem relating $X$ and $X^\mathrm{an}$ says that for any two coherent sheaves $\mathcal{F}$ and $\mathcal{G}$ on $X$, the natural homomorphism

$$\text{Hom}_{\mathcal{O}_X}(\mathcal{F},\mathcal{G})\rightarrow\text{Hom}_{\mathcal{O}^{\text{an}}_X}(\mathcal{F}^{\text{an}},\mathcal{G}^{\text{an}})$$

is an isomorphism. Here $\mathcal{O}_X$ is the structure sheaf of the algebraic variety $X$ and $\mathcal{O}_X^{\text{an}}$ is the structure sheaf of the analytic variety $X^\mathrm{an}$. More precisely, the category of coherent sheaves on the algebraic variety $X$ is equivalent to the category of analytic coherent sheaves on the analytic variety $X^\mathrm{an}$, and the equivalence is given on objects by mapping $\mathcal{F}$ to $\mathcal{F}^\text{an}$. In particular, $\mathcal{O}^{\text{an}}_X$ is itself coherent, a result known as the Oka coherence theorem, and also, it was proved in “Faisceaux Algebriques Coherents” that the structure sheaf of the algebraic variety $\mathcal{O}_X$ is coherent.

Another important statement is as follows: for any coherent sheaf $\mathcal{F}$ on an algebraic variety $X$ the homomorphisms

$$\varepsilon_q\ :\ H^q(X,\mathcal{F}) \rightarrow H^q(X^{\text{an}},\mathcal{F}^{\text{an}})$$

are isomorphisms for all $q$'s. This means that the $q$-th sheaf cohomology group on $X$ is isomorphic to the cohomology group on $X^\mathrm{an}$.

The theorem applies much more generally than stated above (see the formal statement below). It and its proof have many consequences, such as Chow's theorem, the Lefschetz principle and Kodaira vanishing theorem.

== Background ==
Algebraic varieties are locally defined as the common zero sets of polynomials and since polynomials over the complex numbers are holomorphic functions, algebraic varieties over $\C$ can be interpreted as analytic spaces. Similarly, regular morphisms between varieties are interpreted as holomorphic mappings between analytic spaces. Somewhat surprisingly, it is often possible to go the other way, to interpret analytic objects in an algebraic way.

For example, it is easy to prove that the analytic functions from the Riemann sphere to itself are either the rational functions or the identically infinity function (an extension of Liouville's theorem). For if such a function $f$ is nonconstant, then since the set of $z$ where $f(z)$ is infinity is isolated and the Riemann sphere is compact, there are finitely many $z$ with $f(z)$ equal to infinity. Consider the Laurent expansion at all such $z$ and subtract off the singular part: we are left with a function on the Riemann sphere with values in $\C$, which by Liouville's theorem is constant. Thus $f$ is a rational function. This fact shows there is no essential difference between the complex projective line as an algebraic variety, or as the Riemann sphere.

== Important results ==
There is a long history of comparison results between algebraic geometry and analytic geometry, beginning in the nineteenth century. Some of the more important advances are listed here in chronological order.

=== Riemann's existence theorem ===
Riemann surface theory shows that a compact Riemann surface has enough meromorphic functions on it, making it an (smooth projective) algebraic curve. Under the name Riemann's existence theorem a deeper result on ramified coverings of a compact Riemann surface was known: such finite coverings as topological spaces are classified by permutation representations of the fundamental group of the complement of the ramification points. Since the Riemann surface property is local, such coverings are quite easily seen to be coverings in the complex-analytic sense. It is then possible to conclude that they come from covering maps of algebraic curves—that is, such coverings all come from finite extensions of the function field.

=== The Lefschetz principle ===
In the twentieth century, the Lefschetz principle, named for Solomon Lefschetz, was cited in algebraic geometry to justify the use of topological techniques for algebraic geometry over any algebraically closed field K of characteristic 0, by treating K as if it were the complex number field. An elementary form of it asserts that true statements of the first order theory of fields about C are true for any algebraically closed field K of characteristic zero. A precise principle and its proof are due to Alfred Tarski and are based in mathematical logic.

This principle permits the carrying over of some results obtained using analytic or topological methods for algebraic varieties over C to other algebraically closed ground fields of characteristic 0. (e.g. Kodaira type vanishing theorem.)

=== Chow's theorem ===
Chow's theorem (Chow (1949)), proved by Wei-Liang Chow, is an example of the most immediately useful kind of comparison available. It states that an analytic subspace of complex projective space that is closed (in the ordinary topological sense) is an algebraic subvariety. This can be rephrased as "any analytic subspace of complex projective space that is closed in the strong topology is closed in the Zariski topology." This allows quite a free use of complex-analytic methods within the classical parts of algebraic geometry.

=== GAGA ===
Foundations for the many relations between the two theories were put in place during the early part of the 1950s, as part of the business of laying the foundations of algebraic geometry to include, for example, techniques from Hodge theory. The major paper consolidating the theory was Géometrie Algébrique et Géométrie Analytique by Jean-Pierre Serre, now usually referred to as GAGA. It proves general results that relate classes of algebraic varieties, regular morphisms and sheaves with classes of analytic spaces, holomorphic mappings and sheaves. It reduces all of these to the comparison of categories of sheaves.

Nowadays the phrase GAGA-style result is used for any theorem of comparison, allowing passage between a category of objects from algebraic geometry, and their morphisms, to a well-defined subcategory of analytic geometry objects and holomorphic mappings.

==== Formal statement of GAGA ====
1. Let $(X,\mathcal O_X)$ be a scheme of finite type over $\C$. Then there is a topological space $X^\mathrm{an}$ that consists of the closed points of $X$ with a continuous inclusion map $\lambda_X : X^\mathrm{an}\to X$. The topology on $X^\mathrm{an}$ is called the "complex topology" (and is very different from the subspace topology).
2. Suppose $\phi:X\to Y$ is a morphism of schemes of locally finite type over $\C$. Then there exists a continuous map $\phi^\mathrm{an}:X^\mathrm{an}\to Y^\mathrm{an}$ such that $\lambda_Y \circ \phi^\mathrm{an} = \phi \circ \lambda_X$.
3. There is a sheaf $\mathcal O_X^\mathrm{an}$ on $X^\mathrm{an}$ such that $(X^\mathrm{an}, \mathcal O_X^\mathrm{an})$ is a ringed space and $\lambda_X : X^\mathrm{an}\to X$ becomes a map of ringed spaces. The space $(X^\mathrm{an}, \mathcal O_X^\mathrm{an})$ is called the "analytification" of $(X,\mathcal O_X)$ and is an analytic space. For every $\phi:X\to Y$ the map $\phi^\mathrm{an}$ defined above is a mapping of analytic spaces. Furthermore, the map $\phi\mapsto\phi^\mathrm{an}$ maps open immersions into open immersions. If $X=\operatorname{Spec}(\C[x_1,\dots,x_n])$ then $X^\mathrm{an} = \C^n$ and $\mathcal O_X^\mathrm{an}(U)$ for every polydisc $U$ is a suitable quotient of the space of holomorphic functions on $U$.
4. For every sheaf $\mathcal F$ on $X$ (called algebraic sheaf) there is a sheaf $\mathcal F^\mathrm{an}$ on $X^\mathrm{an}$ (called analytic sheaf) and a map of sheaves of $\mathcal O_X$-modules $\lambda_X^*: \mathcal F\rightarrow (\lambda_X)_* \mathcal F^\mathrm{an}$. The sheaf $\mathcal F^\mathrm{an}$ is defined as $\lambda_X^{-1} \mathcal F \otimes_{\lambda_X^{-1} \mathcal O_X} \mathcal O_X^\mathrm{an}$. The correspondence $\mathcal F \mapsto \mathcal F^\mathrm{an}$ defines an exact functor from the category of sheaves over $(X, \mathcal O_X)$ to the category of sheaves of $(X^\mathrm{an}, \mathcal O_X^\mathrm{an})$.
  The following two statements are the heart of Serre's GAGA theorem (as extended by Alexander Grothendieck, Amnon Neeman, and others).
5. If $f:X\to Y$ is an arbitrary morphism of schemes of finite type over $\C$ and $\mathcal F$ is coherent then the natural map $(f_* \mathcal F)^\mathrm{an}\rightarrow f_*^\mathrm{an} \mathcal F^\mathrm{an}$ is injective. If $f$ is proper then this map is an isomorphism. One also has isomorphisms of all higher direct image sheaves $(R^i f_* \mathcal F)^\mathrm{an} \cong R^i f_*^\mathrm{an} \mathcal F^\mathrm{an}$ in this case.
6. Now assume that $X^\mathrm{an}$ is Hausdorff and compact. If $\mathcal F, \mathcal G$ are two coherent algebraic sheaves on $(X, \mathcal O_X)$ and if $f\colon \mathcal F^\mathrm{an} \rightarrow \mathcal G^\mathrm{an}$ is a map of sheaves of $\mathcal O_X^\mathrm{an}$-modules then there exists a unique map of sheaves of $\mathcal O_X$-modules $\varphi: \mathcal F\rightarrow \mathcal G$ with $f =\varphi^\mathrm{an}$. If $\mathcal R$ is a coherent analytic sheaf of $\mathcal O_X^\mathrm{an}$-modules over $X^\mathrm{an}$ then there exists a coherent algebraic sheaf $\mathcal F$ of $\mathcal O_X$-modules and an isomorphism $\mathcal F^\mathrm{an} \cong \mathcal R$.

In slightly lesser generality, the GAGA theorem asserts that the category of coherent algebraic sheaves on a complex projective variety $X$ and the category of coherent analytic sheaves on the corresponding analytic space $X^\mathrm{an}$ are equivalent. The analytic space $X^\mathrm{an}$ is obtained roughly by pulling back to $X$ the complex structure from $\C^n$ through the coordinate charts. Indeed, phrasing the theorem in this manner is closer in spirit to Serre's paper, seeing how the full scheme-theoretic language that the above formal statement uses heavily had not yet been invented by the time of GAGA's publication.

== See also ==
- Flat module - Notion of flatness was introduced by Serre (1956). Algebraic and analytic local rings have the same completion, and thereby they become a "flat couple" (couple plat).
