= Heinrich Behnke =

German mathematician (1898–1979)

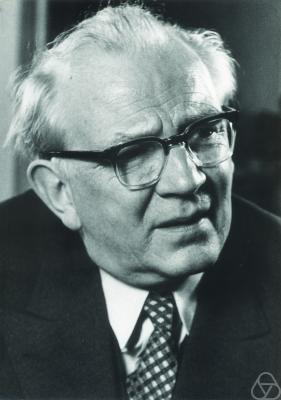
- Born: Heinrich Adolph Louis Behnke; 9 October 1898; Horn, German Empire
- Died: 10 October 1979 (aged 81); Münster, Germany
- Education: University of Göttingen; University of Hamburg
- Known for: Behnke–Stein theorem Behnke–Stein theorem on Stein manifolds
- Scientific career
- Fields: Mathematics
- Workplaces: University of Hamburg; University of Münster
- Doctoral advisor: Erich Hecke
- Doctoral students: Hans-Joachim Bremermann; Hans Grauert; Friedrich Hirzebruch; Reinhold Remmert; Karl Stein; Helmut Ulm; Uwe Storch

Heinrich Adolph Louis Behnke (9 October 1898 – 10 October 1979) was a German mathematician and rector at the University of Münster.

== Life and career ==
He was born into a Lutheran family in Horn, a suburb of Hamburg. He attended the University of Göttingen and submitted his doctoral thesis to the University of Hamburg. He was noted for work on complex analysis with Henri Cartan and Peter Thullen. His first wife, Aenne Albersheim, was Jewish, but she died soon after the birth of their son. He was concerned about his son's ethnicity during the Nazi period. In 1936 he was elected a member of the Deutsche Akademie der Naturforscher Leopoldina.

== Selected publications ==
- with Peter Thullen: Theorie der Funktionen mehrerer komplexer Veränderlicher, Springer Verlag, Ergebnisse der Mathematik und ihrer Grenzgebiete, 1934, 2nd edn. with collaboration by Reinhold Remmert 1970
- with Friedrich Sommer: Theorie der Funktionen einer komplexen Veränderlichen, Springer Verlag, 3rd edn. 1965
- Vorlesung über Differentialgeometrie, Münster, Aschendorff, 7th edn. 1966
- Vorlesung über gewöhnliche Differentialgleichungen, Münster, Aschendorff, 4th edn. 1963
- Vorlesungen über Algebra, Münster, Aschendorff, 3rd edn. 1958
- Vorlesungen über Zahlentheorie, Münster, Aschendorff, 5th edn. 1961
- Vorlesung über klassische Funktionentheorie, Aschendorff
- Vorlesung über Infinitesimalrechnung, Aschendorff
