= Berkowitz =

Berkowitz is an Ashkenazic Jewish surname.

Alternative spellings include Berkovitz, Berkovich, Berkowicz, Berkovits, Berkovic and Berkovici.

Berkowicz is also a Polish surname.

== Bercovic / Bercović / Bercovici ==
- Berkovic - list of people
- Berković - list of people
- Bercovici - list of people

== Berkovitz ==
- Dan Berkovitz, Commissioner of the Commodity Futures Trading Commission
- Eyal Berkovitz (born 1972), Israeli footballer
- Jay R. Berkovitz, Professor of Judaic and Near Eastern Studies at the University of Massachusetts Amherst
- Philip B. is the professional name of Philip Berkovitz, an American hair stylist and entrepreneur

== Berkowicz ==
- Józef Berkowicz (1789–1846), Polish military officer
- Konrad Berkowicz (born 1984), Polish politician

== Berkowits / Berkovits ==
- Laszlo Berkowits (1928–2020), American rabbi
- Eliezer Berkovits (1908–1992), rabbi, author, theologian and philosopher
- Yitzchak Berkovits, American-Israeli Orthodox Jewish rabbi, rosh kollel and posek

== Berkowitz ==
- Albert Berkowitz (1910–2008), New York politician
- Avi Berkowitz (born 1988), American attorney
- Benzion Judah Berkowitz (1803–1879), Hebrew scholar
- Bob Berkowitz, American journalist, talk show host, and author
- Bobbie Berkowitz, American professor of nursing
- Bruce D. Berkowitz (born 1956), American author
- Bruce R. Berkowitz (born 1961), American equity fund manager
- Daisy Berkowitz, stage name of Scott Putesky (1968–2017), American musician
- David Berkowitz (born 1953), American serial killer
- David B. Berkowitz, American chemist
- Edward Berkowitz, American history professor
- Ethan Berkowitz (born 1962), American politician in Alaska
- Ira Berkowitz (born 1939), American writer of crime fiction
- Isaac Dov Berkowitz (1885–1967), Belarus-born Israeli author
- Joan Berkowitz (1931–2020), American chemist
- Leon Berkowitz (1911–1987), American painter
- Leonard Berkowitz (1926–2016), American social psychologist
- Liane Berkowitz (1923–1943), member of the German resistance movement during World War II
- Lisa Berkowitz (born 1952), American bridge player
- Marc Summers (born Berkowitz; born 1951), American television personality
- Michael Berkowitz, American historian
- Monroe Berkowitz (1919–2009), American economist
- Niv Berkowitz (born 1986), Israeli basketball player
- Norbert Berkowitz (1924–2001), Canadian scientist
- Peter Berkowitz (born 1959), American political scientist
- Ralph Berkowitz (1910–2011), American composer, classical musician
- Richard Berkowitz (born 1955), American author and safe sex advocate
- Roger Berkowitz, American seafood restaurant chain owner
- Ron Berkowitz (born 1972), American entrepreneur, publicist and sports journalist, founder of Berk Communications
- Sean M. Berkowitz (born 1967), American lawyer
- Sol Berkowitz (1922–2006), American composer and music educator
- Steven Berkowitz (born 1958), American real estate developer
- Terry Berkowitz, American artist

== See also ==
- 25657 Berkowitz, an asteroid
- Berkovec
- Berkovets
- Berkovići, village and municipality in Republika Srpska, Bosnia and Herzegovina
- Berkovich
- Bercow, Anglicized from Berkowitz
