= Berkovich =

Berkovich (Ukrainian: Беркович) is an Ashkenazi Jewish surname. Notable people with the surname include:

- E.S. Berkovich, Russian scientist and inventor of the Berkovich hardness indenter
- Evgenia Berkovich (born 1985), Russian playwright and theatre director
- Eyal Berkovich (born 1972), Israeli football player
- Miki Berkovich (born 1954), Israeli basketball player
- Vladimir Berkovich, Israeli mathematician
  - Berkovich space in mathematics
- Yuli Berkovich (1944–2012), Russian cosmonaut
- Ziv Berkovich (born 1984), Israeli cinematographer and screenwriter

== See also ==
- Berkovic
- Berković
- Berkovits
- Berkowitz
