= Bercovitch =

Bercovitch may refer to:

- Alexander Bercovitch (1891–1951), Canadian painter
- Lauren Bercovitch (born 1984), Canadian producer
- Pascale Bercovitch (born 1967), French-Israeli writer and paralympic athlete
- Peter Bercovitch (1879–1942), Canadian politician in Quebec
- Sacvan Bercovitch (1933–2014), Canadian literary and cultural critic

== See also ==
- Berkovich
- Berkowitz
