= Berkovits =

Berkovits is the name of

- Barouh Berkovits (1926–2012), Czech-born medical researcher
- Berel Berkovits (1949–2005), Rabbi and Dayan, beit din of London's Federation of Synagogues
- Eliezer Berkovits (1908–1992), German orthodox rabbi
- Yitzchak Berkovits, Orthodox Jewish rabbi, rosh kollel and posek in Jerusalem

== See also ==
- Berkovich
- Berkovic
- Berkowitz
