= Jeffrey T. Richelson =

American author and academic (1949–2017)

Jeffrey Talbot Richelson (31 December 1949 – 11 November 2017) was an American author and academic researcher who studied the process of intelligence gathering and national security. He authored at least thirteen books and many articles about intelligence, and directed the publication of several of the National Security Archive's collections of source documents.

Richelson was notable for his relentless Freedom of Information requests in order to further scholarship in intelligence and espionage. According to Bruce D. Berkowitz, Richelson was once avoided by the intelligence community as an outsider and a security risk, but gradually became trusted to the extent that he was invited to Central Intelligence Agency sponsored conferences.

Richelson grew up in the Bronx and earned his BA from the City College of New York. He completed a PhD in political science at the University of Rochester in 1975 and went on to teach at the University of Texas, Austin and American University. Richelson was a senior fellow with the National Security Archive.

== Books ==
- Social choice theory and Soviet national security decisionmaking. Center for International and Strategic Affairs UCLA. 1982. ISBN 978-0-86682-048-6
- United States strategic reconnaissance: photographic/imaging satellites. Center for International and Strategic Affairs UCLA. 1983. ISBN 978-0-86682-050-9.
- Jeffrey Richelson and Desmond Ball. The ties that bind: intelligence cooperation between the UKUSA countries. Allen & Unwin. 1985. ISBN 0-04-327092-1.
- Sword and shield: the Soviet intelligence and security apparatus. Ballinger Publishing Company. 1986. ISBN 0-88730-035-9.
- American espionage and the Soviet target. William Morrow. 1987. ISBN 0-688-06753-0.
- Foreign intelligence organizations. Ballinger Publishing Company. 1988. ISBN 0-88730-121-5.
- America's secret eyes in space: the U.S. Keyhole spy satellite program. Harper & Row. 1990. ISBN 0-88730-285-8.
- A century of spies: intelligence in the twentieth century. Oxford University Press. 1995. ISBN 0-19-507391-6, ISBN 0-19-511390-X (paperback).
- The U.S. intelligence community. First edition. Ballinger Publishing Company. 1985. ISBN 0-88730-024-3.
  - Second edition. Ballinger Publishing Company. 1989. ISBN 0-88730-245-9.
  - Third edition. Westview Press. 1995. ISBN 978-0-8133-2376-3.
  - Fourth edition. Westview Press. 1999. ISBN 978-0-8133-6893-1.
  - Fifth edition. Westview Press. 2007. ISBN 978-0-8133-4362-4.
  - Sixth edition. Westview Press. 2012. ISBN 978-0-8133-4512-3. OCLC 701015423.
  - Seventh edition. Westview Press. 2016. ISBN 978-0-8133-4918-3.
- America's space sentinels: DSP satellites and national security. University of Kansas Press. 1999. ISBN 0-7006-0942-3.
- The Wizards of Langley: inside the CIA's Directorate of Science and Technology. Westview Press. 2001. ISBN 0-8133-6699-2.
- Spying on the bomb: American nuclear intelligence from Nazi Germany to Iran and North Korea. Norton. 2006. ISBN 0-393-05383-0.
- Defusing Armageddon: Inside NEST, America's Secret Nuclear Bomb Squad. New York: W.W. Norton. 2009. ISBN 978-0-393-06515-2. OCLC 227016184.
