= Berkovich space =

Analytic space in mathematics

In mathematics, a Berkovich space, introduced by Berkovich (1990), is a version of an analytic space over a non-Archimedean field (e.g. p-adic field), refining Tate's notion of a rigid analytic space.

== Motivation ==
In the complex case, algebraic geometry begins by defining the complex affine space to be $\Complex^n.$ For each $U\subset\Complex^n,$ we define $\mathcal{O}_U,$ the ring of analytic functions on $U$ to be the ring of holomorphic functions, i.e. functions on $U$ that can be written as a convergent power series in a neighborhood of each point.

We then define a local model space for $f_{1}, \ldots, f_{n}\in\mathcal{O}_U$ to be

$$X:=\{x\in U:f_{1}(x)= \cdots =f_{n}(x)=0\}$$

with $\mathcal{O}_X=\mathcal{O}_U/(f_{1}, \ldots,f_{n}).$ A complex analytic space is a locally ringed $\Complex$-space $(Y, \mathcal{O}_Y)$ which is locally isomorphic to a local model space.

When $k$ is a complete non-Archimedean field, we have that $k$ is totally disconnected. In such a case, if we continue with the same definition as in the complex case, we wouldn't get a good analytic theory. Berkovich gave a definition which gives nice analytic spaces over such $k$, and also gives back the usual definition over $\Complex.$

In addition to defining analytic functions over non-Archimedean fields, Berkovich spaces also have a nice underlying topological space.

== Berkovich spectrum ==
A seminorm on a ring $A$ is a non-constant function $|\!-\!|: A \to \R_{\geq 0}$ such that

$$\begin{align}
|0|&=0 \\
|1|&=1 \\
|f+g| &\leqslant |f|+|g| \\
|fg| &\leqslant |f||g|
\end{align}$$

for all $f, g \in A$. It is called multiplicative if $|fg| =|f||g|$ and is called a norm if $|f| = 0$ implies $f = 0$.

If $A$ is a normed ring with norm $\|\!-\!\|$ then the Berkovich spectrum of $A$, denoted $\mathcal{M}(A)$, is the set of multiplicative seminorms on $A$ that are bounded by the norm of $A$.

The Berkovich spectrum is equipped with the weakest topology such that for any $f \in A$ the map

$$\begin{cases} \varphi_{f}:\mathcal{M}(A)\to\R \\ |\cdot| \mapsto |f| \end{cases}$$

is continuous.

The Berkovich spectrum of a normed ring $A$ is non-empty if $A$ is non-zero and is compact if $A$ is complete.

If $x$ is a point of the spectrum of $A$ then the elements $f$ with $|f|_x = 0$ form a prime ideal of $A$. The field of fractions of the quotient by this prime ideal is a normed field, whose completion is a complete field with a multiplicative norm; this field is denoted by $\mathcal{H}(x)$ and the image of an element $f\in A$ is denoted by $f(x)$. The field $\mathcal{H}(x)$ is generated by the image of $A$.

Conversely a bounded map from $A$ to a complete normed field with a multiplicative norm that is generated by the image of $A$ gives a point in the spectrum of $A$.

The spectral radius of $f,$

$$\rho(f)=\lim_{n\to\infty} \left \|f^n \right \|^{\frac{1}{n}}$$

is equal to

$$\sup_{x\in\mathcal{M}(A)}|f|_{x}.$$

=== Examples ===
- The spectrum of a field complete with respect to a valuation is a single point corresponding to its valuation.
- If $A$ is a commutative C*-algebra then the Berkovich spectrum is the same as the Gelfand spectrum. A point of the Gelfand spectrum is essentially a homomorphism to $\Complex$, and its absolute value is the corresponding seminorm in the Berkovich spectrum.
- Ostrowski's theorem shows that any multiplicative seminorm on the integers (with the usual absolute value) is one of the following four types: $|-|_{\infty, \varepsilon} (0 < \varepsilon \leq 1), |-|_0, |-|_{p, \varepsilon} (0 < \varepsilon < 1)$ and $|-|_{p,0}$ ($p$ a prime). Here $|-|_{\infty, \varepsilon} = |-|_{\infty}^\varepsilon$, $|-|_{p, \varepsilon}$ is the $p$-adic norm for which $|p| = \varepsilon$, $|-|_{p, 0}$ is the seminorm induced by the trivial norm $|-|_{0}$ on $\mathbb{Z}/p$, and $|-|_{0}$ is the trivial norm on $\mathbb{Z}$, i.e., the norm which sends all nonzero elements to 1. For each $p$ (prime or infinity) we get a branch which is homeomorphic to a real interval, the branches meet at the point corresponding to the trivial valuation. The open neighborhoods of the trivial valuations are such that they contain all but finitely many branches, and their intersection with each branch is open.

== Berkovich affine space ==
If $k$ is a field with a valuation, then the n-dimensional Berkovich affine space over $k$, denoted $\mathbb{A}^n_k$, is the set of multiplicative seminorms on $k[x_1, \ldots,x_n]$ extending the norm on $k$.

The Berkovich affine space is equipped with the weakest topology such that for any $f\in k$ the map $\varphi_{f}: \mathbb{A}^n \to\R$ taking $|\cdot|\in\mathbb{A}^n$ to $| f|$ is continuous. This is not a Berkovich spectrum, but is an increasing union of the Berkovich spectra of rings of power series that converge in some ball (so it is locally compact).

We define an analytic function on an open subset $U\subset\mathbb{A}^{n}$ as a map

$$f:U\to\prod_{x\in U}\mathcal{H}(x)$$

with $f(x)\in\mathcal{H}(x)$, which is a local limit of rational functions, i.e., such that every point $x\in U$ has an open neighborhood $U'\subset U$ with the following property:

$$\forall \varepsilon > 0\,\exist g, h \in\mathcal{k}[x_{1}, \ldots, x_{n}]: \qquad \forall x' \in U' \left( h(x') \neq 0 \ \,\land\ \left|f(x')-\frac{g(x')}{h(x')}\right| < \varepsilon \right).$$

Continuing with the same definitions as in the complex case, one can define the ring of analytic functions, local model space, and analytic spaces over any field with a valuation (one can also define similar objects over normed rings). This gives reasonable objects for fields complete with respect to a nontrivial valuation and the ring of integers $\Z.$

In the case where $k=\Complex,$ this will give the same objects as described in the motivation section.

These analytic spaces are not all analytic spaces over non-Archimedean fields.

=== Berkovich affine line ===
The 1-dimensional Berkovich affine space is called the Berkovich affine line. When $k$ is an algebraically closed non-Archimedean field, complete with respects to its valuation, one can describe all the points of the affine line.

There is a canonical embedding $k\hookrightarrow\mathbb{A}^1_k$ .

The space $\mathbb{A}^{1}$ is a locally compact, Hausdorff, and uniquely path-connected topological space which contains $k$ as a dense subspace.

One can also define the Berkovich projective line $\mathbb{P}^{1}$ by adjoining to $\mathbb{A}^{1}$, in a suitable manner, a point at infinity. The resulting space is a compact, Hausdorff, and uniquely path-connected topological space which contains $\mathbb{P}^{1}(k)$ as a dense subspace.
