= Journal of Social History =

The Journal of Social History
- Discipline: Social history
- Language: English

Publication details
- History: 1967–present
- Publisher: George Mason University Press/Oxford University Press (United States)
- Frequency: Quarterly
- Impact factor: 0.364 (2016)

Standard abbreviations
- ISO 4: J. Soc. Hist.

Indexing
- ISSN: 0022-4529 (print); 1527-1897 (web)
- JSTOR: 00224529

Links
- Journal homepage

The Journal of Social History was founded in 1967 and has been edited since then by Peter Stearns. The journal covers social history in all regions and time periods.

Articles in the journal frequently combine sociohistorical analysis between Latin America, Africa, Asia, Russia, Western Europe, and the United States. The journal is published quarterly by the George Mason University Press. Since the September 2011 issue, it has also been published by Oxford University Press.
