= Aphther =

- Years active: c. 195 BC/193 BC
- Known for: Rebelling against Masinissa
- Title: Numidian prince or Vassal tribal leader

Aphther (Ancient Greek: Ἀφθῆρα, Latin: Aphthirem) was a vassal, perhaps a prince who revolted against the Numidian king Masinissa creating his own separatist state.

== Rebelion ==
He is known from the reports of Titus Livius and Polybius. He was a vassal of the Numidian ruler Massinissa, but betrayed him and marched with a detachment to the region of Cyrene. According to the French historians J. and C. Picard, Massinissa was repeatedly forced to fight against the uprisings of rebels, who were apparently tribal leaders who did not want to reconcile themselves to the strengthening of centralized power. Massinissa, who was pursuing Aphther, appealed to the Carthaginians to allow him to pass through the Emporia, but did not receive consent. According to W. Huss, this case shows that at that time (after the Third Macedonian War of 171-168 BC), the ruler of Numidia still recognized the authority of Carthage over this territory and respected the previously determined borders.

Sources are somewhat vague about the date of this event. Following S. Gsell, historians would tend to place it before 193, perhaps even as early as 195, a time when Carthage, of which Hannibal was still suffete, felt strong enough to resist Massinissa's encroachments and the various pressures he attempted to exert upon it. This was also a time when the Numidian king had not yet consolidated his power, as evidenced by Aphther's rebellion. However, in recounting the events of 162 BC, which saw Massinissa definitively seize the Emporia, from Taenae to Lepcis, and probably beyond, Polybius suggests that the affair of Aphther took place shortly before. This "short period" could possibly refer to a time of about twenty years (Polybius xxxi, 21). Gsell therefore wonders if Polybius's text on the conquest of the Emporia of Lesser Syria was not interpolated by the Byzantine chronicler who transmitted this fragment to us.

Historians do not know who Aphther was or the reasons for his rebellion, but it is certain that this leader had troops large enough for Masinissa to have deemed it essential to chase him with a real army, unless this was a good pretext on the part of the Massylian to test the Carthaginians' resistance to a policy of military intervention. In any case, Aphther was a high-ranking figure; It has been assumed that he was a Massylian prince or a vassal tribal chief. His flight to Cyrenaica suggests that he controlled territories in southern Tunisia.

== Etymology of the name ==
The name Aphther is simply a more or less accurate transcription of a Libyan personal name; Polybius writes Aphthera (accusative case), and Livy also gives the accusative form Aphtirem. It is tempting to connect Aphther with the name that Libyan inscriptions give about ten times (R.I.L. nos. 100, 203 to 207, 443, 691, 923) in the form IFTN, and which O. Masson has shown to have been known from Cyrenaica (Aphthan at Taucheira) to western Mauretania, where the prince of Tingi, Ascalis, had a certain Ipthas as his father (Plutarch, Sertorius, ix). The same name is known in the form Ieptha at Maktar (G. Picard, Karthago, vol. 8, 1957, p. 77, which he reads Leptha). However, following S. Chaker's suggestions, it is possible that we are dealing with two very similar but distinct names. IFTN (YFTN) and its various spellings would fall into the category of complex nouns constructed as follows: verb + personal affix + object: IFTN (YFTN) is read I IF(surpass) + ten = "He will surpass them." Aphther (or Aphthan) would be an isolated nominal form with a noun marker: a + noun: A-FTN (or FTR).

== Bibliography ==
Primary Sources

- Titus Livius. History from the Foundation of the City (XXXIV.62.10)
- Polybius. General History (Polybius)|General History (XXXII.2)
- Gsell S., Histoire ancienne de l’Afrique du Nord, t. III, pp. 306, 314, 315.
- Camps G., Massinissa ou les débuts de l’Histoire, 1961, p. 192, 215, 227.
- Masson O., « Libyca. 4. Un nom libyque du Maroc à la Cyrénaïque », Semitica, t. XXV, 1975, pp. 75-85. — « Grecs et Libyens en Cyrénaïque», Antiquités africaines, t. X, 1976, pp. 48-62.
- Chaker S., « Onomastique berbère ancienne (Antiquité et Moyen Age) ; rupture et continuité», Histoire et archéologie de l’Afrique du Nord, IIe colloque international, Grenoble, 1983, C.T.H.S., 1985, pp. 483-496.

Research

- V. Huss. History of the Carthaginians / Translated from German by Yuli Berkovich. - St. Petersburg, 2015. - ISBN 978-5-4469-0224-8. P. 305.
- Picard J., Picard K. Carthage. Chronicle of the legendary city-state from its foundation to its fall.
- Klebs E. Aphther (german) : // Paulys Realencyclopädie der classischen Altertumswissenschaft. - Stuttgart : J.B. Metzler [German], 1894. — Bd. I,2. — Kol. 2796.
