= Family Matters (disambiguation) =

Family Matters is an American sitcom that originally aired from 1989 to 1998.

Family Matters may also refer to:

- Family Matters, journal of the Australian Institute of Family Studies
- Family Matters (1993 film), a film directed by Susanne Bier
- Family Matters (2022 film), a Philippine family drama film
- Family Matters (2025 film), a Taiwanese family drama film
- Family Matters (novel), 2002
- Family Matters (Singaporean TV series), 2006–present
- Family Matters (South Korean TV series), 2024
- "Family Matters" (Drake song), a 2024 diss track by Drake
- "Family Matters" (Skye Newman song), a 2025 song by Skye Newman
- Family Matters (album), a 2023 album
- "Family Matters" (Supernatural), an episode of the television series Supernatural
- "Family Matters", a quest in The Witcher 3: Wild Hunt
- Jo Frost: Family Matters, a British television talk show
- "Family Matters", a 1990 episode of the TV series In the Heat of the Night
- Family Matters, a 2006 novel by Ira Berkowitz
- "Family Matters" (Small Achievable Goals), a 2025 episode of the TV series Small Achievable Goals

== See also ==
- A Family Matter (disambiguation)
- Sociology of the family
