= Nanoindentation =

Material testing procedure that makes a very small mark in a surface

Nanoindentation, also called instrumented indentation testing, is a variety of indentation hardness tests applied to small volumes. Indentation is perhaps the most commonly applied means of testing the mechanical properties of materials. The nanoindentation technique was developed in the mid-1970s to measure the hardness of small volumes of material.

== Background ==
In a traditional indentation test (macro or micro indentation), a hard tip whose mechanical properties are known (frequently made of a very hard material like diamond) is pressed into a sample whose properties are unknown. The load placed on the indenter tip is increased as the tip penetrates further into the specimen and soon reaches a user-defined value. At this point, the load may be held constant for a period or removed. The area of the residual indentation in the sample is measured and the hardness, $H$, is defined as the maximum load, $P_\text{max}$, divided by the residual indentation area, $A_\text{r}$:

$$H=\frac{P_\text{max}} {A_\text{r}}.$$

For most techniques, the projected area may be measured directly using light microscopy. As can be seen from this equation, a given load will make a smaller indent in a "hard" material than a "soft" one.

This technique is limited due to large and varied tip shapes, with indenter rigs which do not have very good spatial resolution (the location of the area to be indented is very hard to specify accurately). Comparison across experiments, typically done in different laboratories, is difficult and often meaningless. Nanoindentation improves on these macro- and micro-indentation tests by indenting on the nanoscale with a very precise tip shape, high spatial resolutions to place the indents, and by providing real-time load-displacement (into the surface) data while the indentation is in progress.

Figure 1. Schematic of load-displacement curve for an instrumented nanoindentation test

In nanoindentation small loads and tip sizes are used, so the indentation area may only be a few square micrometres or even nanometres. This presents problems in determining the hardness, as the contact area is not easily found. Atomic force microscopy or scanning electron microscopy techniques may be utilized to image the indentation, but can be quite cumbersome. Instead, an indenter with a geometry known to high precision (usually a Berkovich tip, which has a three-sided pyramid geometry) is employed. During the course of the instrumented indentation process, a record of the depth of penetration is made, and then the area of the indent is determined using the known geometry of the indentation tip. While indenting, various parameters such as load and depth of penetration can be measured. A record of these values can be plotted on a graph to create a load-displacement curve (such as the one shown in Figure 1). These curves can be used to extract mechanical properties of the material.

=== Young's modulus ===
The slope of the curve, $dP/dh$, upon unloading is indicative of the stiffness $S$ of the contact. This value generally includes a contribution from both the material being tested and the response of the test device itself. The stiffness of the contact can be used to calculate the reduced Young's modulus $E_\text{r}$:

$$E_\text{r}=\frac{1}{\beta}\frac{\sqrt{\pi}}{2}\frac{S}{\sqrt{A_p(h_\text{c})}},$$

where $A_p(h_\text{c})$ is the projected area of the indentation at the contact depth $h_c$, and $\beta$ is a geometrical constant on the order of unity. $A_\text{p}(h_\text{c})$ is often approximated by a fitting polynomial as shown below for a Berkovich tip:

$$A_p(h_\text{c})=C_0h_\text{c}^2+C_1h_\text{c}^1+C_2h_\text{c}^{1/2}+C_3h_\text{c}^{1/4}+\ldots+C_8h_\text{c}^{1/128}$$

where $C_0$ for a Berkovich tip is 24.5 while for a cube corner (90°) tip is 2.598. The reduced modulus $E_\text{r}$ is related to Young's modulus $E_\text{s}$ of the test specimen through the following relationship from contact mechanics:

$$1/E_\text{r}=(1-\nu_i^2)/E_i+(1-\nu_s^2)/E_\text{s}.$$

Here, the subscript $i$ indicates a property of the indenter material and $\nu$ is Poisson's ratio. For a diamond indenter tip, $E_i$ is 1140 GPa and $\nu_i$ is 0.07. Poisson's ratio of the specimen, $\nu_s$, generally varies between 0 and 0.5 for most materials (though it can be negative) and is typically around 0.3.

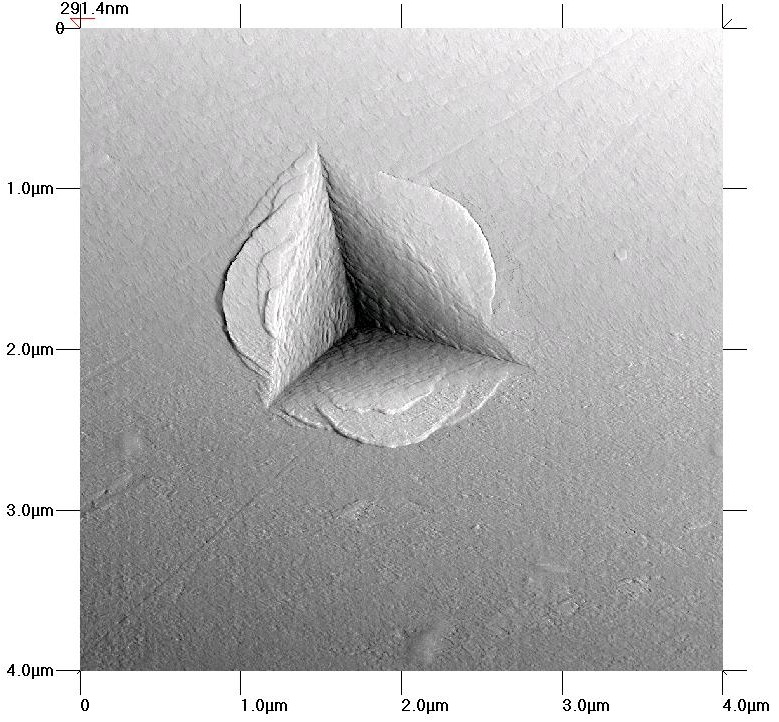
An atomic force microscope image of an indent left by a Berkovich tip in a Zr-Cu-Al metallic glass; the plastic flow of the material around the indenter is apparent.

There are two different types of hardness that can be obtained from a nano indenter: one is as in traditional macroindentation tests where one attains a single hardness value per experiment; the other is based on the hardness as the material is being indented resulting in hardness as a function of depth.

$$H=\frac{P_\text{max}} {A_\text{r}}.$$

=== Hardness ===
The hardness is given by the equation above, relating the maximum load to the indentation area. The area can be measured after the indentation by in-situ atomic force microscopy, or by 'after-the event' optical (or electron) microscopy. An example indentation image, from which the area may be determined, is shown at right.

Some nanoindenters use an area function based on the geometry of the tip, compensating for elastic load during the test. Use of this area function provides a method of gaining real-time nanohardness values from a load-displacement graph. However, there is some controversy over the use of area functions to estimate the residual areas versus direct measurement. An area function $A_p(h_c)$ typically describes the projected area of an indent as a 2nd-order polynomial function of the indenter depth $h$. When too many coefficients are used, the function will begin to fit to the noise in the data, and inflection points will develop. If the curve can fit well with only two coefficients, this is the best. However, if many data points are used, sometimes all 6 coefficients will need to be used to get a good area function. Typically, 3 or 4 coefficients works well. Service Document Probe Calibration; CSV-T-003 v3.0; Exclusive application of an area function in the absence of adequate knowledge of material response can lead to misinterpretation of resulting data. Cross-checking of areas microscopically is to be encouraged.

=== Strain-rate sensitivity ===
The strain-rate sensitivity of the flow stress $m$ is defined as

$$m=\frac{\partial\ln{\sigma}}{\partial\ln{\dot{\varepsilon}}},$$

where $\sigma=\sigma(\dot{\varepsilon})$ is the flow stress and $\dot{\varepsilon}$ is the strain rate produced under the indenter. For nanoindentation experiments which include a holding period at constant load (i.e. the flat, top area of the load-displacement curve), $m$ can be determined from

$$d\ln{H}=m d\ln{\dot{\varepsilon_p}}+n d\ln{h_p}.$$

The subscripts $p$ indicate these values are to be determined from the plastic components only.

=== Activation volume ===
Interpreted loosely as the volume swept out by dislocations during thermal activation, the activation volume $V^*$ is

$$V^*=9 k_\text{B} T \frac{\partial\ln{\dot{\varepsilon}}}{\partial H},$$

where $T$ is the temperature and k_{B} is the Boltzmann constant. From the definition of $m$, it is easy to see that $V^*\propto (H m)^{-1}$.

== Hardware ==
=== Sensors ===
The construction of a depth-sensing indentation system is made possible by the inclusion of very sensitive displacement and load sensing systems. Load transducers must be capable of measuring forces in the micronewton range and displacement sensors are very frequently capable of sub-nanometre resolution. Environmental isolation is crucial to the operation of the instrument. Vibrations transmitted to the device, fluctuations in atmospheric temperature and pressure, and thermal fluctuations of the components during the course of an experiment can cause significant errors.

=== Continuous stiffness measurement (CSM) ===
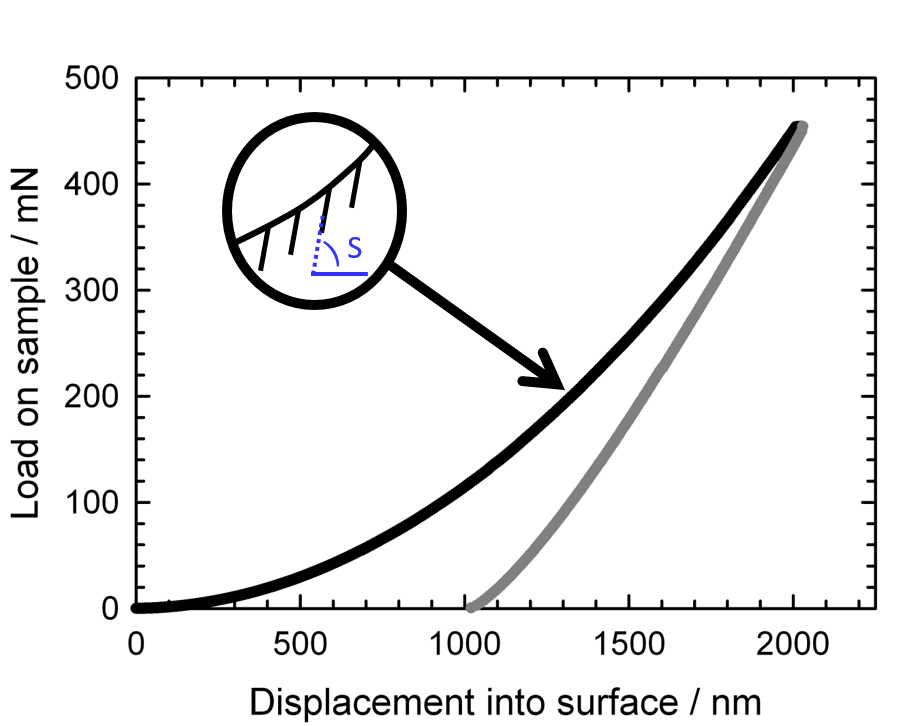
Dynamic nanoindentation with continuous stiffness measurement (CSM)

Dynamic nanoindentation or continuous stiffness measurement (CSM, also offered commercially as CMX, dynamics...), introduced in 1989, is a significant improvement over the quasi-static mode described above. It consists into overlapping a very small, fast (> 40 Hz) oscillation onto the main loading signal and evaluate the magnitude of the resulting partial unloadings by a lock-in amplifier, so as to quasi-continuously determine the contact stiffness. This allows for the continuous evaluation of the hardness and Young's modulus of the material over the depth of the indentation, which is of great advantage with coatings and graded materials. The CSM method is also pivotal for the experimental determination of the local creep and strain-rate dependent mechanical properties of materials, as well as the local damping of visco-elastic materials. The harmonic amplitude of the oscillations is usually chosen around 2 nm (RMS), which is a trade-off value avoiding an underestimation of the stiffness due to the "dynamic unloading error" or the "plasticity error" during measurements on materials with unusually high elastic-to-plastic ratio (E/H > 150), such as soft metals.

=== Atomic Force Microscopy ===
The ability to conduct nanoindentation studies with nanometre depth, and sub-nanonewton force resolution is also possible using a standard AFM setup. The AFM allows for nanomechanical studies to be conducted alongside topographic analyses, without the use of dedicated instruments. Load-displacement curves can be collected similarly for a variety of materials – provided that they are softer than the AFM tip – and mechanical properties can be directly calculated from these curves. Conversely, some commercial nanoindentation systems offer the possibility to use a piezo-driven stage to image the topography of residual indents with the nanoindenter tip.

=== Optical Interferometry ===
Utilizing optical fiber Fabry-Perôt interferometry, nanoindentation studies can be performed with unparalleled precision, achieving micro-mechanical characterization of soft biomaterials. Optical interferometry, allows for nanomechanical studies of biomaterials alongside topographic analyses without the need for dedicated instruments. This technology is particularly adept at micro-mechanical analysis of soft and living materials. Load-displacement curves can be gathered for a diverse range of materials, and their mechanical properties can be directly inferred from these curves. Additionally, some advanced systems offer the capability to integrate optical imaging with micro-mechanical characterization, enabling a comprehensive understanding of the relationship between structure and stiffness in biomaterials.

== Software ==
=== Experimental software ===
The indentation curves have often at least thousands of data points. The hardness and elastic modulus can quickly be calculated by using a programming language or a spreadsheet. Instrumented indentation testing machines come with the software specifically designed to analyze the indentation data from their own machine. The Indentation Grapher (Dureza) software is able to import text data from several commercial machines or custom made equipment. Spreadsheet programs such as MS-Excel or OpenOffice Calculate do not have the ability to fit to the non-linear power law equation from indentation data. A linear fit can be done by offset $(-h(P_0))$ displacement so that the data passes through the origin. Then select the power law equation from the graphing $XY$ options.

The Martens hardness, $HM$, is a simple software for any programmer having minimal background to develop. The software starts by searching for the maximum displacement, $h_\text{max}$, point and maximum load, $P_\text{max}$.

$$HM=\frac{P_\text{max}} {A_{s}}.$$

The displacement is used to calculate the contact surface area, $A_\text{s}$, based on the indenter geometry. For a perfect Berkovich indenter the relationship is $A_\text{s} = 24.5 h_\text{max}^2$.

The indentation hardness, $H_\text{IT}$ is defined slightly different.

$$H_\text{IT}=\frac{P_\text{max}} {A_\text{p}}.$$

Here, the hardness is related to the projected contact area $A_\text{p}$.

As the indent size decreases the error caused by tip rounding increases. The tip wear can be accounted for within the software by using a simple polynomial function. As the indenter tip wears the $C_1$ value will increase. The user enters the values for $C_0$ and $C_1$ based on direct measurements such as SEM or AFM images of the indenter tip or indirectly by using a material of known elastic modulus or an atomic force microscope (AFM) image of an indentation.

$$A_\text{p} = C_0 h_\text{max}^2 + C_1 h_\text{max}.$$

Calculating the elastic modulus with software involves using software filtering techniques to separate the critical unloading data from the rest of the load-displacement data. The start and end points are usually found by using user defined percentages. This user input increases the variability because of possible human error. It would be best if the entire calculation process was automatically done for more consistent results. A good nanoindentation machine prints out the load unload curve data with labels to each of the segments such as loading, top hold, unload, bottom hold, and reloading. If multiple cycles are used then each one should be labeled. However mores nanoindenters only give the raw data for the load-unload curves. An automatic software technique finds the sharp change from the top hold time to the beginning of the unloading. This can be found by doing a linear fit to the top hold time data. The unload data starts when the load is 1.5 times standard deviation less than the hold time load. The minimum data point is the end of the unloading data. The computer calculates the elastic modulus with this data according to the Oliver—Pharr (nonlinear). The Doerner-Nix method is less complicated to program because it is a linear curve fit of the selected minimum to maximum data. However, it is limited because the calculated elastic modulus will decrease as more data points are used along the unloading curve. The Oliver–Pharr nonlinear curve fit method to the unloading curve data where $h$ is the depth variable, $h_\text{f}$ is the final depth and $k$ and $m$ are constants and coefficients. The software must use a nonlinear convergence method to solve for $k$, $h_\text{f}$ and $m$ that best fits the unloading data. The slope is calculated by differentiating $dP/dh$ at the maximum displacement.

$$P = k \left(h-h_{f}\right)^m.$$

An image of the indent can also be measured using software. The atomic force microscope (AFM) scans the indent. First the lowest point of the indentation is found. Make an array of lines around the using linear lines from indent center along the indent surface. Where the section line is more than several standard deviations (> 3 $\sigma$) from the surface noise the outline point is created. Then connect all of the outline points to build the entire indent outline. This outline will automatically include the pile-up contact area.

For nanoindentation experiments performed with a conical indenter on a thin film deposited on a substrate or on a multilayer sample, the NIMS Matlab toolbox is useful for load-displacement curves analysis and calculations of Young's modulus and hardness of the coating. In the case of pop-in, the PopIn Matlab toolbox is a solution to analyze statistically pop-in distribution and to extract critical load or critical indentation depth, just before pop-in. Finally, for indentation maps obtained following the grid indentation technique, the TriDiMap Matlab toolbox offers the possibility to plot 2D or 3D maps and to analyze statistically mechanical properties distribution of each constituent, in case of a heterogeneous material by doing deconvolution of probability density function.

=== Computational software ===
Molecular dynamics (MD) has been a very powerful technique to investigate the nanoindentation at atomic scale. For instance, Alexey et al employed MD to simulate the nanoindentation process of a titanium crystal, dependence of deformation of the crystalline structure on the type of the indenter is observed, which is very hard to harvest in experiment. Tao et al performed MD simulations of nanoindentation on Cu/Ni nanotwinned multilayers films using a spherical indenter and investigated the effects of hetero-twin interface and twin thickness on hardness. Recently, a review paper by Carlos et al is published upon the atomistic studies of nanoindentation. This review covers different nanoindentation mechanisms and effects of surface orientation, crystallography (fcc, bcc, hcp, etc), surface and bulk damage on plasticity. All of the MD-obtained results are very difficult to be achieved in experiment due to the resolution limitation of structural characterization techniques. Among various MD simulation software, such as GROMACS, Xenoview, Amber, etc., LAMMPS (Large-scale Atomic/Molecular Massively Parallel Simulator), which is developed by Sandia National Laboratories, is the most widely used for simulation. An interaction potential and an input file including information of atom ID, coordinates, charges, ensemble, time step, etc are fed to the simulator, and then running could be executed. After specified running timesteps, information such as energy, atomic trajectories, and structural information (such as coordination number) could be output for further analysis, which makes it possible to investigate the nanoindentation mechanism at atomic-scale. Another interesting Matlab toolbox called STABiX has been developed to quantify slip transmission at grain boundaries by analyzing indentation experiments in bicrystal.

== Applications ==
Nanoindentation is a robust technique for determination of mechanical properties. By combining the application of low loads, measuring the resulting displacement, and determining the contact area between the tip of the indenter and the sample a wide range of mechanical properties are able to be measured. The application that drove the innovation of the technique is testing thin film properties for which conventional testing are not feasible. Conventional mechanical testing such as tensile testing or dynamic mechanical analysis (DMA) can only return the average property without any indication of variability across the sample. However, nanoindentation can be used for determination of local properties of homogeneous as well as heterogeneous materials. The reduction in sample size requirements has allowed the technique to become broadly applied to products where the manufactured state does not present enough material for microhardness testing. Applications in this area include medical implants, consumer goods, and packaging. Alternative uses of the technique are used to test MEMs devices by utilizing the low-loads and small scale displacements the nanoindenter is capable of.

== Limitations ==
Conventional nanoindentation methods for calculation of Modulus of elasticity (based on the unloading curve) are limited to linear, isotropic materials.

=== Pile up and sink in ===
Problems associated with the "pile-up" or "sink-in" of the material on the edges of the indent during the indentation process remain a problem that is still under investigation. It is possible to measure the pile-up contact area using computerized image analysis of atomic force microscope (AFM) images of the indentations. This process also depends on the linear isotropic elastic recovery for the indent reconstruction.

=== Nanoindentation on soft materials ===
Nanoindentation of soft material has intrinsic challenges due to adhesion, surface detection and tip dependency of results. There is an ongoing research to overcome such problems.

Two critical issues need to be considered when attempting nanoindentation measurements on soft materials: stiffness and viscoelasticity.

The first is the requirement that in any force-displacement measurement platform the stiffness of the machine ($k_\text{machine}$) must approximately match the stiffness of the sample ($k_\text{sample}$), at least in order of magnitude. If $k_\text{machine}$ is too high, then the indenter probe will simply run through the sample without being able to measure the force. On the other hand, if $k_\text{machine}$ is too low, then the probe simply will not indent into the sample, and no reading of the probe displacement can be made. For samples that are very soft, the first of these two possibilities is likely.

The stiffness of a sample is given by

$k_\text{sample}$ ≈ $a$ × $E_\text{sample}$

where $a$ is the size of the contact region between the indenter and the sample, and $E$ is the sample's elastic modulus. Typical atomic-force microscopy (AFM) cantilevers have $k_\text{machine}$ in the range 0.05 to 50 N/m, and probe size in the range ~10 nm to 1 μm. Commercial nanoindenters are also similar. Therefore, if $k_\text{machine}$≈$k_\text{sample}$, then a typical AFM cantilever-tip or a commercial nanoindenter can only measure $E_\text{sample}$ in the ~kPa to GPa range. This range is wide enough to cover most synthetic materials including polymers, metals and ceramics, as well as a large variety of biological materials including tissues and adherent cells. However, there may be softer materials with moduli in the Pa range, such as floating cells, and these cannot be measured by an AFM or a commercial nanoindenter.

To measure $E_\text{sample}$ in the Pa range, "pico-indentation" using an optical tweezers system is suitable. Here, a laser beam is used to trap a translucent bead which is then brought into contact with the soft sample so as to indent it. The trap stiffness ($k_\text{machine}$) depends on the laser power and bead material, and a typical value is ~50 pN/μm. The probe size $a$ can be a micron or so. Then the optical trap can measure $E_\text{sample}$ (≈ $k_\text{machine}$/$a$) in the Pa range.

The second issue concerning soft samples is their viscoelasticity. Methods to handle viscoelasticity include the following.

In the classical treatment of viscoelasticity, the load-displacement (P-h) response measured from the sample is fitted to predictions from an assumed constitutive model (e.g. the Maxwell model) of the material comprising spring and dashpot elements. Such an approach can be very time consuming, and cannot in general prove the assumed constitutive law in an unambiguous manner.

Dynamic indentation with an oscillatory load can be performed, and the viscoelastic behavior of the sample is presented in terms of the resultant storage and loss moduli, often as variations over the load frequency. However, the storage and loss moduli obtained this way are not intrinsic material constants, but depend on the oscillation frequency and the indenter probe geometry.

A rate-jump method can be used to return an intrinsic elastic modulus of the sample that is independent of the test conditions. In this method, a constitutive law comprising any network of (in general) non-linear dashpots and linear elastic springs is assumed to hold within a very short time window about the time instant tc at which a sudden step change in the loading rate is applied on the sample. Since the dashpots are described by relations of the form $\dot\epsilon$_{ij}=$\dot\epsilon$_{ij}($\sigma$_{kl}) but stress $\sigma$_{kl} is continuous across the step change ∆$\dot\sigma$_{ij} in the stress rate field $\dot\sigma$_{kl} at t_{c}, there will not be any corresponding change in the strain rate field $\dot\epsilon$_{ij} across the dashpots. However, because the linear elastic springs are described by relations of the form $\epsilon$_{ij} = S_{ikjl}$\sigma$_{kl} where S_{ikjl} are elastic compliances, a step change ∆$\dot\epsilon$_{ij} across the springs will result according to

∆$\dot\epsilon$_{ij} = S_{ikjl}∆$\dot\sigma$_{kl}

The last equation indicates that the fields ∆$\sigma$_{kl} and ∆$\dot\epsilon$_{ij} can be solved as a linear elastic problem with the elastic spring elements in the original viscoelastic network model while the dashpot elements are ignored. The solution for a given test geometry is a linear relation between the step changes in the load and displacement rates at tc, and the linking proportionality constant is a lumped value of the elastic constants in the original viscoelastic model. Fitting such a relation to experimental results allows this lumped value to be measured as an intrinsic elastic modulus of the material.

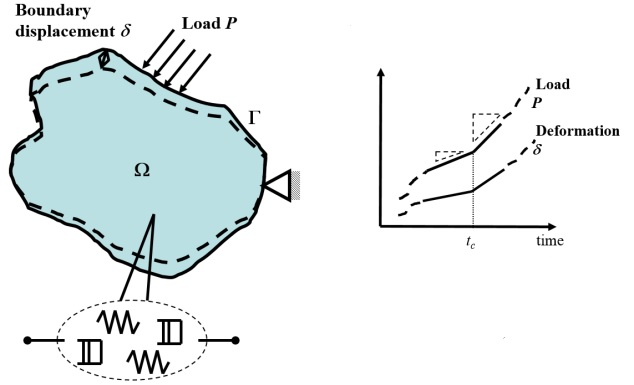
The rate-jump method

Specific equations from this rate-jump method have been developed for specific test platforms. For example, in depth-sensing nanoindentation, the elastic modulus and hardness are evaluated at the onset of an unloading stage following a load-hold stage. Such an onset point for unloading is a rate-jump point, and solving the equation $\epsilon$_{ij} = S_{ikjl}$\sigma$_{kl} across this leads to the Tang–Ngan method of viscoelastic correction

$$\frac{1}{S_\text{e}} = \frac{1}{2E_ra} = \frac{\Delta\dot h}{\Delta\dot P} = \frac{1}{S} - \frac{\dot h_\text{h}}{\dot P_\text{u}}$$

where S = dP/dh is the apparent tip-sample contact stiffness at the onset of unload, $\dot h_\text{h}$ is the displacement rate just before the unload, $\dot P_\text{u}$ is the unloading rate, and $S_\text{e}$ is the true (i.e. viscosity-corrected) tip-sample contact stiffness which is related to the reduced modulus $E_\text{r}$ and the tip-sample contact size $a$ by the Sneddon relation. The contact size a can be estimated from a pre-calibrated shape function $f(h_\text{c})=\pi a^2$ of the tip, where the contact depth $h_\text{c}$ is obtainable using the Oliver—Pharr relation with the apparent contact stiffness $S$ replaced by the true stiffness $S_\text{e}$:

$$h_\text{c} = h_\text{max} - \epsilon \frac{P_\text{max}}{S_\text{e}} = h_\text{max} - \epsilon P_\text{max} \left(\frac{1}{S}-\frac{\dot h_\text{h}}{\dot P_\text{u}}\right)$$

where $\epsilon$ is a factor depending on the tip (say, 0.72 for Berkovich tip).

=== Tip dependence ===
While nanoindentation testing can be relatively simple, the interpretation of results is challenging. One of the main challenges is the use of proper tip depending on the application and proper interpretation of the results. For instance, it has been shown that the elastic modulus can be tip dependent.

=== Scale effects ===
Indent depths during nanoindentation can vary from a few nm up to around a micron. Over this range, there are strong "size effects" – ie inferred mechanical properties exhibit a dependence on depth. Several reviews cover these effects. They usually take the form of the material apparently becoming harder for shallower depths. For example, the hardness of pure gold has been found to vary from about 2 GPa for a depth of 5 nm to 0.5 GPa for a depth of 100 nm, while the "correct" value for large scale indentation of such gold is about 0.1 GPa. There have been many investigations of the causes of this effect. Postulated explanations include the need to create very high gradients of plastic strain with small indents, requiring "geometrically necessary dislocations". Another suggestion is that there may be no dislocations in the region being deformed, with the need for their nucleation creating a requirement for higher stresses to allow plastic deformation to start (leading to a "pop-in" feature on a load-displacement plot). However, no systematic, universal correction can be made for such "size effects" and it is not normally possible with nanoindenters to deform a volume that is large enough to be representative of the bulk material. For typical polycrystalline samples, such volumes must contain a relatively large number of grains, so as to capture the effects of grain size, texture, grain boundary structure etc. In practice, this usually requires the dimensions of the deformed region to be of the order of hundreds of microns. It may also be noted that the fine scale of nanoindentation can make the outcome sensitive to surface roughness and to the presence of oxide layers and other surface contamination.
