= Bercovici =

Bercovici is a surname. Notable people with the surname include:

- Anna Appel (actress), born as Anna Bercovici, (1888–1963), Romanian-born American actress
- David Bercovici (born 1960), American geophysicist
- Eric Bercovici (1933–2014), American film and television producer, screenwriter
- Israil Bercovici (1921–1988), Romanian dramatist, playwright, director, biographer and memoirist
- Konrad Bercovici (1882–1961), Romanian-American writer
- Leonardo Bercovici (1908–1995), American screenwriter
- Luca Bercovici (born 1957), American film and television producer, actor, writer, director
- Martin Bercovici (1902–1971), Romanian electrical engineer
- Mike Bercovici (born 1993), American football quarterback
- Noël Bernard Bercovici (1925–1981), Romanian journalist
- Philippe Bercovici (born 1963), French comics artist
- Vivian Bercovici (born 1961), Canadian-Israeli politician
- Alexander Bercovici (born 1991), Austrian National Rugby Player

== See also ==
- Berkowitz
