= Miklós Ribár =

Serbian politician

Miklós Ribár (Serbian Cyrillic: Миклош Рибар, romanized: Mikloš Ribar; born 1952) is a Serbian medical doctor and former politician from the country's Hungarian community. He was a member of the Vojvodina provincial assembly from 1993 to 1997, serving with the Democratic Fellowship of Vojvodina Hungarians (VMDK).

== Early life and private career ==
Ribár was born in Čoka, Autonomous Province of Vojvodina, in what was then the People's Republic of Serbia in the Federal People's Republic of Yugoslavia. He began working in surgery at the Senta Public Hospital in 1983, received his Ph.D. in Szeged in 1989, and completed specialization in orthopedics and traumatology at the University of Novi Sad in 1992.

== Politician ==
=== Parliamentary elections ===
Ribár ran for the Novi Kneževac and Čoka constituency seat in the 1990 Serbian parliamentary election, the first to be held after the country's de jure return to multiparty democracy earlier in the year. During the campaign, he said that his most important goal was to resolve the issue of Hungarian language education in a satisfactory manner, from kindergarten to university. Although he finished first in the first round of voting, he was defeated by Socialist Party of Serbia (SPS) candidate Dušan Jančić in the second round. This was the only Serbian parliamentary election in which members were elected for individual constituencies; all subsequent elections at the republic level have taken place under proportional representation. During this period, the political landscape of Serbia generally was dominated by the authoritarian rule of Socialist Party leader Slobodan Milošević and his allies.

Ribár appeared in the eighth position on the VMDK's electoral list for the Zrenjanin division in the 1992 Serbian parliamentary election. The list won seven seats, and he was not elected. (From 1992 to 2000, Serbia's electoral law stipulated that one-third of parliamentary mandates would be assigned to candidates from successful lists in numerical order, while the remaining two-thirds would be distributed amongst other candidates at the discretion of the sponsoring parties. Ribár could have been given a parliamentary mandate despite his list position, although in the event he was not.)

During the 1992 election campaign, Ribár charged that life was becoming worse for Hungarians under the Socialist Party's governance; at one meeting, he remarked that there were mainly Hungarians in stables and others in offices.

=== Provincial and municipal politics ===
Ribár was elected to the Vojvodina assembly in the December 1992 provincial election and to the Čoka municipal assembly in the December 1992 local elections, both of which took place concurrently with the parliamentary vote. At the provincial level, he defeated seven other candidates to win election in the Čoka division. The Socialist Party won a plurality victory in the provincial assembly with fifty seats out of 120, and, despite some challenges, governed the province for the full term that followed. The VMDK won seventeen seats and served in opposition.

At the local level, the VMDK had the support of fifteen delegates out of thirty-one in the Čoka municipal assembly after the December 1992 elections, as did a rival bloc comprising the Socialist Party, the Serbian Radical Party (SRS), and several independents. Andrija Poljak of the Democratic Movement of Serbia (DEPOS) was the "swing vote," not formally aligned with either camp. When the assembly met on 26 January 1993, the VMDK nominated Ribár for president (i.e., speaker), a position that was at the time equivalent to mayor. Both he and the Socialist Party nominee Mirko Stojkov received fifteen votes in the first two rounds of voting. After a pause in the proceedings, the VMDK and DEPOS made an arrangement, and another VMDK delegate, György Berkovits, was elected as mayor with the support of sixteen delegates.

On 12 February 1993, the assembly held an emergency meeting and annulled the results of the 26 January vote; Poljak was persuaded to change his vote following pressure from the Socialist Party's bloc. There were tensions between Serb and Hungarian representatives at this meeting, although some delegates from both communities made efforts to calm the situation. The assembly did not elect a new mayor, and Stojkov, as the outgoing mayor from the previous term, returned to the position on a provisional basis. Further attempts to resolve the situation were not successful, and on 22 May 1993 the Serbian government appointed a five-member council led by Stojkov to govern the municipality.

Ribár was a vocal critic of these events, charging that the Socialist Party had effectively stolen control of the municipal administration. After the annulment of the VMDK government, he said that the Socialists had deliberately scheduled the January meeting of the Čoka municipal assembly on the same day that the provincial assembly was inaugurated, forcing him to miss one of the meetings in a context where the government and opposition delegates were almost evenly matched in both institutions. He also accused the state authorities of forcibly mobilizing some elected Hungarian delegates into the Yugoslav Army to reduce their numbers in the local assembly. In May 1993, he charged that the VMDK delegates were told openly that an ethnically Hungarian mayor in Čoka would not be acceptable.

The VMDK experienced a serious split in 1994, with several leading members leaving to establish the Alliance of Vojvodina Hungarians (VMSZ). Ribár remained with the VMDK and took part in discussions for cooperation between the parties. Generally, he appears to have become less active with politics after this time; a 1995 newspaper report indicated that he was the least active member of the VMDK parliamentary group in the provincial assembly. He did not seek re-election to the Čoka municipal assembly in the 1996 Serbian local elections. Available online sources do not indicate if he ran for re-election at the provincial level; if he did, he was not successful.

Ribár sought to the Čoka assembly in the 2000 local elections with a combined endorsement from four parties, including the VMDK and the VMSZ. Available online sources do not indicate if he was elected.

== Electoral record ==
=== Provincial ===
December 1992 Vojvodina provincial election: Čoka
Candidate	Party	Votes	%
Miklós Ribár	Democratic Fellowship of Vojvodina Hungarians	4,919	elected
Branislav Bandić	no party designation		
Jovan Bandov	no party designation		
Veselin Dabović	Serb Democratic Party		
Nedeljko Kolundžija	no party designation		
Vasa Naumov	Democratic Movement of Serbia		
János Törtei (incumbent)	Citizens' Group		
Ilonka Vastag	Socialist Party of Serbia		
Total			
Source: All candidates except Ribár are listed alphabetically.

=== National Assembly of Serbia ===
1990 Serbian parliamentary election: Novi Kneževac and Čoka
Candidate	Party	First round		Second round	
Candidate	Party	Votes	%	Votes	%
Dušan Jančić	Socialist Party of Serbia	6,547	32.60	9,143	50.88
Miklós Ribár	Democratic Fellowship of Vojvodina Hungarians	7,528	37.49		defeated
Milan Marković	Serbian Renewal Movement		defeated		
Miodrag Perkučin	Democratic Party–Citizens' Group		defeated		
Total					
Source: Marković and Perkučin are listed alphabetically.
