= Berkovets =

Berkovets may refer to:

- Berkovets (Kyiv) (Ukrainian: Берковець), Subdivision of Kyiv
- Berkovets (unit of mass) (Russian: Берковец), historical Russian unit of mass

== See also ==
- Berkovec
- Berkowitz
