= A Family Matter =

A Family Matter may refer to:

- A Family Matter (comics), a 1998 graphic novel by American cartoonist Will Eisner
- "A Family Matter" (Gilmore Girls episode), an episode of the TV show Gilmore Girls

== See also ==
- Family Matters (disambiguation)
