= Identity theorem =

Theorem on the equality of analytic functions

In real analysis and complex analysis, branches of mathematics, the identity theorem for analytic functions states: given functions f and g analytic on a domain D (open and connected subset of $\mathbb{R}$ or $\mathbb{C}$), if f = g on some $S \subseteq D$, where $S$ has an accumulation point in D, then f = g on D.

Thus an analytic function is completely determined by its values on a single open neighborhood in D, or even a countable subset of D with an accumulation point (provided this contains a converging sequence together with its limit). This is not true in general for real-differentiable functions, even infinitely real-differentiable functions. In comparison, analytic functions are a much more rigid notion.

The underpinning fact from which the theorem is established is the expandability of a holomorphic function into its Taylor series.

The connectedness assumption on the domain D is necessary. For example, if D consists of two disjoint open sets, $f$ can be $0$ on one open set, and $1$ on another, while $g$ is $0$ on one, and $2$ on another.

== Lemma ==
If two holomorphic functions $f$ and $g$ on a domain D agree on a set S which has an accumulation point $c$ in $D$, then $f = g$ on a disk in $D$ centered at $c$.

To prove this, it is enough to show that $f^{(n)}(c)= g^{(n)}(c)$ for all $n\geq 0$, since both functions are analytic.

If this is not the case, let $m$ be the smallest nonnegative integer with $f^{(m)}(c)\ne g^{(m)}(c)$. By holomorphy, we have the following Taylor series representation in some open neighborhood U of $c$:

$$\begin{align}
(f - g)(z) &{}=(z - c)^m  \cdot \left[\frac{(f - g)^{(m)}(c)}{m!} + \frac{(z - c) \cdot (f - g)^{(m+1)}(c)}{(m+1)!} + \cdots  \right]  \\[6pt]
&{}=(z - c)^m  \cdot h(z).
\end{align}$$

By continuity, $h$ is non-zero in some small open disk $B$ around $c$. But then $f-g\neq 0$ on the punctured set $B-\{c\}$. This contradicts the assumption that $c$ is an accumulation point of $\{f = g\}$.

This lemma shows that for a complex number $a \in \mathbb{C}$, the fiber $f^{-1}(a)$ is a discrete (and therefore countable) set, unless $f \equiv a$.

== Proof ==
Define the set on which $f$ and $g$ have the same Taylor expansion:
$$T = \left\{ z \in D \mathrel{\Big\vert} f^{(k)}(z) = g^{(k)}(z) \text{ for all } k \geq 0\right\} = \bigcap_{k=0}^\infty \left\{ z \in D \mathrel{\Big\vert} \bigl(f^{(k)}- g^{(k)}\bigr)(z) = 0\right\}.$$

We'll show $T$ is nonempty, open, and closed. Then by connectedness of $D$, $T$ must be all of $D$, which implies $f=g$ on $T=D$.

By the lemma, $f = g$ in a disk centered at $c$ in $D$, they have the same Taylor series at $c$, so $c\in T$, hence $T$ is nonempty.

As $f$ and $g$ are holomorphic on $D$, $\forall w\in T$, the Taylor series of $f$ and $g$ at $w$ have non-zero radius of convergence. Therefore, the open disk $B_r(w)$ also lies in $T$ for some $r$. So $T$ is open.

By holomorphy of $f$ and $g$, they have holomorphic derivatives, so all $\textstyle f^{(n)}, g^{(n)}$ are continuous. This means that $\textstyle \bigl\{z \in D \mathrel{\big\vert} \bigl(f^{(k)} - g^{(k)}\bigr)(z) = 0\bigr\}$ is closed for all $k$. $S$ is an intersection of closed sets, so it's closed.

== Full characterisation ==
Since the identity theorem is concerned with the equality of two holomorphic functions, we can simply consider the difference (which remains holomorphic) and can simply characterise when a holomorphic function is identically $0$. The following result can be found in.

=== Claim ===
Let $G\subseteq\mathbb{C}$ denote a non-empty, connected open subset of the complex plane. For analytic $h:G\to\mathbb{C}$ the following are equivalent.

1. $h\equiv 0$ on $G$;
2. the set $G_{0}=\{z\in G\mid h(z)=0\}$ contains an accumulation point, $z_{0}$;
3. the set $G_{\ast}=\bigcap_{n\in\N_0} G_{n}$ is non-empty, where $G_{n} := \{z\in G\mid h^{(n)}(z)=0\}$.

=== Proof ===
(1 $\Rightarrow$ 2) holds trivially.

(2 $\Rightarrow$ 3) is shown in section Lemma in part with Taylor expansion at accumulation point, just substitute g=0.

(3 $\Rightarrow$ 1) is shown in section Proof with set where all derivatives of f-g vanishes, just substitute g=0.

Q.E.D.

== See also ==
- Analytic continuation
- Identity theorem for Riemann surfaces
