= Berkovic =

Berkovic (Ukrainian: Беркович) is a Jewish-Ukrainian surname that may refer to:

- Cecilia Berkovic, Canadian artist
- Eyal Berkovic (born 1972), Israeli football player
- Nir Berkovic (born 1982), Israeli football player
- Samuel Berkovic (born 1953), Australian neurologist

== See also ==
- Berković
- Berkovich
- Berkovits
