= Dušan Jančić =

Serbian politician (born 1954)

Dušan Jančić (Serbian Cyrillic: Душан Јанчић; born 1954) is a Serbian former politician. He served two terms in the Serbian parliament between 1991 and 1997 and was the mayor of Novi Kneževac for a number of years. During his time as an elected official, he was a member of the Socialist Party of Serbia (SPS).

== Private career ==
Jančić holds a Bachelor of Laws degree.

== Politician ==
Jančić first became mayor of Novi Kneževac following the 1989 Serbian local elections.

He was elected to the Serbian national assembly for the Novi Kneževac and Čoka constituency in the 1990 parliamentary election, defeating Miklós Ribár of the Democratic Fellowship of Vojvodina Hungarians (VMDK) in the second round of voting. The SPS won a majority victory in the election, and Jančić served as a government supporter. He was part of a group of Socialist delegates that called for the decentralization of financial and administrative powers to local authorities, noting that many residents of his municipality often had to travel 120 kilometers over poor roads to Zrenjanin to exercise their rights.

Relations between Serbia's different ethnic communities worsened in the early period of the breakup of Yugoslavia, and in early 1991, a rumour spread throughout Novi Kneževac that a large quantity of Kalashnikov rifles had been discovered in the possession of the municipality's Hungarian residents. Jančić publicly condemned the rumour as a complete fabrication, saying, "Some extremists cannot accept the fact that nations and nationalities live together peacefully here." Later in the year, he accused "some extremists in the VMDK" of poisoning relations between the Serb and Hungarian communities.

Jančić continued to serve as mayor of Novi Kneževac after the May 1992 Serbian local elections. In the course of the year, he negotiated with officials in Hungary for the opening of the Đala-Tiszasziget border crossing.

Serbia adopted a system of proportional representation for the 1992 parliamentary election, and Jančić appeared in the twentieth position out of twenty-eight on the SPS's electoral list for the Zrenjanin division. The list won eight seats, and he was not included in his party's delegation for the new assembly. (From 1992 to 2000, Serbia's electoral law stipulated that one-third of parliamentary mandates would be assigned to candidates from successful lists in numerical order, while the remaining two-thirds would be distributed amongst other candidates at the discretion of the sponsoring parties. Jančić could have been given a new mandate despite his list position, although in the event he was not.) He was, however, confirmed for another term as mayor of Novi Kneževac after the concurrent December 1992 Serbian local elections. During the December 1992 campaigns, the Democratic Movement of Serbia (DEPOS) coalition accused Jančić and an associate of disrupting an opposition political rally while inebriated.

Jančić was promoted to the fifteenth position on the SPS's list for Zrenjanin in the 1993 parliamentary election and was awarded an "optional" mandate when the list won ten seats. His second term began when the new assembly convened in January 1994. The Socialists won the election with 123 out of 250 seats and afterward formed a new government with support from the New Democracy (ND) party. In the assembly, Jančić served as a member of the legislative committee and the committee on international affairs.

In September 1996, he met with China's ambassador to the Federal Republic of Yugoslavia (FRY) in his capacity as mayor.

Available online sources do not indicate if Jančić continued to serve as mayor of Novi Kneževac after the 1996 Serbian local elections; in any event, he was no longer in the role as of late 1999. He was not a candidate in the 1997 parliamentary election, and his term ended in that year.

Serbia's longtime authoritarian leader Slobodan Milošević was defeated in the 2000 Yugoslavian presidential election and fell from power on 5 October 2000. The Serbian government also fell in the wake of these events, and a new Serbian parliamentary election was called for December 2000. Prior to the vote, Serbia's electoral laws were reformed such that the entire country became a single electoral division and all parliamentary mandates were assigned to candidates on successful lists at the discretion of the sponsoring parties or coalitions, irrespective of numerical order. Jančić received the seventy-fifth position on the SPS's list, which was mostly alphabetical, and was not given a mandate when the party won thirty-seven seats. He does not seem to have returned to political life after this time.

== Electoral record ==
=== National Assembly of Serbia ===
1990 Serbian parliamentary election: Novi Kneževac and Čoka
Candidate	Party	First round		Second round	
Candidate	Party	Votes	%	Votes	%
Dušan Jančić	Socialist Party of Serbia	6,547	32.60	9,143	50.88
Miklós Ribár	Democratic Fellowship of Vojvodina Hungarians	7,528	37.49		defeated
Milan Marković	Serbian Renewal Movement		defeated		
Miodrag Perkučin	Democratic Party–Citizens' Group		defeated		
Total					
Source: Marković and Perkučin are listed alphabetically.
