= Edward Berkowitz =

Edward D. Berkowitz is a professor of history at George Washington University.

== Education ==
A graduate of Princeton University, Berkowitz received his master's and doctoral degrees in American history from Northwestern University. His area of special expertise is the history of Social Security and related social policies.

== Career ==
Before moving to George Washington in 1982, he served as the first John F. Kennedy Fellow at the University of Massachusetts Boston and as a senior staff member of the President's Commission for a National Agenda for the Eighties. He has consulted on various aspects of social welfare policy with such organizations as the Milbank Memorial Fund, The Century Foundation, the Committee for Economic Development, the Hastings Center, and the Health Insurance Association of America. He is the author of more than 70 articles on various aspects of social welfare policy.

== Family ==
He is the son of former Rutgers University professor Monroe Berkowitz (1919–2009).

== Works ==
- Making Social Welfare Policy in America: Three Case Studies since 1950, University of Chicago Press, 2020. ISBN 978-0-226-69206-7
- Review: Commissioning the Future, Getting the Present, Reviews in American History, Vol. 11, No. 2 (Jun., 1983), pp. 294–299 JSTOR 2702159
- Something Happened : A Political and Cultural Overview of the Seventies, Columbia University Press, 2006, ISBN 978-0-231-12494-2
- Disabled Policy: America's Programs for the Handicapped, Cambridge University Press, 1989, ISBN 978-0-521-38930-3
- America's Welfare State: From Roosevelt to Reagan, Johns Hopkins University Press, 1991, ISBN 978-0-8018-4128-6
- Mr. Social Security: The Life of Wilbur J. Cohen, University Press of Kansas, 1995, ISBN 978-0-7006-0707-5
- To Improve Human Health: A History of the Institute of Medicine, National Academies Press, 1998, ISBN 978-0-309-06188-9
- Robert Ball and the Politics of Social Security, University of Wisconsin Press, 2005, ISBN 978-0-299-18954-9
- Creating the welfare state: the political economy of twentieth-century reform, Authors Edward D. Berkowitz, Kim McQuaid, University Press of Kansas, 1992, ISBN 9780700605286
