= Rigid analytic space =

Analogue of a complex analytic space over a nonarchimedean field

In mathematics, a rigid analytic space is an analogue of a complex analytic space over a nonarchimedean field. Such spaces were introduced by John Tate in 1962, as an outgrowth of his work on uniformizing p-adic elliptic curves with bad reduction using the multiplicative group. In contrast to the classical theory of p-adic analytic manifolds, rigid analytic spaces admit meaningful notions of analytic continuation and connectedness.

== Definitions ==
The basic rigid analytic object is the n-dimensional unit polydisc, whose ring of functions is the Tate algebra $T_n$, made of power series in n variables whose coefficients approach zero in some complete nonarchimedean field k. The Tate algebra is the completion of the polynomial ring in n variables under the Gauss norm (taking the supremum of coefficients), and the polydisc plays a role analogous to that of affine n-space in algebraic geometry. Points on the polydisc are defined to be maximal ideals in the Tate algebra, and if k is algebraically closed, these correspond to points in $k^n$ whose coordinates have norm at most one.

An affinoid algebra is a k-Banach algebra that is isomorphic to a quotient of the Tate algebra by an ideal. An affinoid is then the subset of the unit polydisc on which the elements of this ideal vanish, i.e., it is the set of maximal ideals containing the ideal in question. The topology on affinoids is subtle, using notions of affinoid subdomains (which satisfy a universality property with respect to maps of affinoid algebras) and admissible open sets (which satisfy a finiteness condition for covers by affinoid subdomains). In fact, the admissible opens in an affinoid do not in general endow it with the structure of a topological space, but they do form a Grothendieck topology (called the G-topology), and this allows one to define good notions of sheaves and gluing of spaces.

A rigid analytic space over k is a pair $(X, \mathcal{O}_X)$ describing a locally ringed G-topologized space with a sheaf of k-algebras, such that there is a covering by open subspaces isomorphic to affinoids. This is analogous to the notion of manifolds being coverable by open subsets isomorphic to euclidean space, or schemes being coverable by affines. Schemes over k can be analytified functorially, much like varieties over the complex numbers can be viewed as complex analytic spaces, and there is an analogous formal GAGA theorem. The analytification functor respects finite limits.

== Other formulations ==
Around 1970, Michel Raynaud provided an interpretation of certain rigid analytic spaces as formal models, i.e., as generic fibers of formal schemes over the valuation ring R of k. In particular, he showed that the category of quasi-compact quasi-separated rigid spaces over k is equivalent to the localization of the category of quasi-compact admissible formal schemes over R with respect to admissible formal blow-ups. Here, a formal scheme is admissible if it is coverable by formal spectra of topologically finitely presented R-algebras whose local rings are R-flat.

Formal models suffer from a problem of uniqueness, since blow-ups allow more than one formal scheme to describe the same rigid space. Huber worked out a theory of adic spaces to resolve this, by taking a limit over all blow-ups. These spaces are quasi-compact, quasi-separated, and functorial in the rigid space, but lack a lot of nice topological properties.

Vladimir Berkovich reformulated much of the theory of rigid analytic spaces in the late 1980s, using a generalization of the notion of Gelfand spectrum for commutative unital C*-algebras. The Berkovich spectrum of a Banach k-algebra A is the set of multiplicative semi-norms on A that are bounded with respect to the given norm on k, and it has a topology induced by evaluating these semi-norms on elements of A. Since the topology is pulled back from the real line, Berkovich spectra have many nice properties, such as compactness, path-connectedness, and metrizability. Many ring-theoretic properties are reflected in the topology of spectra, e.g., if A is Dedekind, then its spectrum is contractible. However, even very basic spaces tend to be unwieldy – the projective line over C_{p} is a compactification of the inductive limit of affine Bruhat–Tits buildings for PGL_{2}(F), as F varies over finite extensions of Q_{p}, when the buildings are given a suitably coarse topology.

== See also ==
- Rigid cohomology
