= György Berkovits =

Serbian politician

György Berkovits (Serbian Cyrillic: Ђерђ Берковић, romanized: Đerđ Berković; born 14 July 1940) is a Serbian former politician from the country's Hungarian community. He briefly served as the mayor of Čoka in 1993 and was a member of the Vojvodina provincial assembly from 2000 to 2004. During his time as an elected official, Berkovits was a member of the Democratic Fellowship of Vojvodina Hungarians (VMDK) and subsequently the Alliance of Vojvodina Hungarians (VMSZ).

== Early life and private career ==
Berkovits was born in Čoka, in what was then the Danube Banovina of the Kingdom of Yugoslavia. Raised in his home village in the Federal People's Republic of Yugoslavia after World War II, he took teacher training in Subotica, graduated from the history department at the University of Novi Sad's Faculty of Philosophy, and taught elementary school in Padej. He later took further training, graduated from the Faculty of Economics in Subotica, and worked at the Senta branch of the Vojvođanska banka.

== Politician ==
=== Local politics in Čoka ===
Berkovits was elected to the Čoka municipal assembly in the December 1992 Serbian local elections as a candidate of the Democratic Fellowship of Vojvodina Hungarians. The election did not produce a clear winner: the VMDK had the support of fifteen delegates out of thirty-one in the assembly, as did a rival bloc comprising the Socialist Party of Serbia (SPS), the Serbian Radical Party (SRS), and several independents. Andrija Poljak of the Democratic Movement of Serbia (DEPOS) was the "swing vote," not formally aligned with either camp. When the assembly met on 26 January 1993, the VMDK nominated Miklós Ribár for president (i.e., speaker), a position that was at the time equivalent to mayor. Both he and the Socialist Party nominee Mirko Stojkov received fifteen votes in the first two rounds of voting. After a pause in the proceedings, the VMDK and DEPOS made an arrangement; Ribár withdrew his candidacy, and Berkovits was elected mayor with the support of sixteen delegates.

His time in office was brief. On 12 February 1993, the assembly held an emergency meeting and annulled the results of the 26 January vote; Poljak was persuaded to change his vote following pressure from the Socialist Party's bloc. There were tensions between Serb and Hungarian representatives at this meeting, although some delegates from both communities made efforts to calm the situation. Berkovits argued that the municipality was in crisis and that there were more important issues than whether the mayor was a Serb or a Hungarian; at one point in the debate, he noted with dry irony that his profession was "economist" and not "Hungarian." Ultimately, the assembly did not choose a new mayor, and Stojkov, as the outgoing mayor from the previous term, returned to the position on a provisional basis. Further attempts to resolve the situation were not successful, and on 22 May 1993 the Serbian government appointed a five-member council led by Stojkov to govern the municipality.

The VMDK experienced a serious split in 1994, with several leading members leaving to form the breakaway Alliance of Vojvodina Hungarians. Berkovits initially stayed with the VMDK and became the leader of its local branch in Čoka, despite the fact that he was not a supporter of hardline party president András Ágoston. In the buildup to the 1996 Serbian local elections, Berkovits initiated dialogue with the VMSZ toward running a united electoral slate in Čoka. The two parties ultimately reached an arrangement, as the result of which several VMDK members, including Berkovits, agreed to run for the local assembly as Citizens' Group (i.e., independent) candidates. The Yugoslav Left (JUL) won a plurality victory in the municipality and was able to form a new government; Berkovits was personally re-elected and served afterward in opposition.

By 2000, Berkovits had left the VMDK for the VMSZ. For the 2000 Serbian local elections, the VMSZ led an electoral alliance in Čoka that also included the VMDK, the League of Social Democrats of Vojvodina (LSV), and the Reformists of Vojvodina (RV). Berkovits ran for re-election in the municipality's twenty-eighth division. Available online sources do not clarify if he was successful, although as the VMSZ's alliance won a majority victory it should be considered probable.

=== Provincial representative ===
Berkovits was elected to the Vojvodina assembly in the 2000 provincial election, which took place concurrently with the local vote. The VMSZ ran in an alliance with the Democratic Opposition of Serbia (DOS), and collectively they won a landslide victory with 116 out of 120 seats. Berkovits served as a supporter of the provincial administration over the next four years and was not a candidate in the 2004 provincial election.

=== After 2004 ===
The VMSZ organization in Čoka became divided after 2000, and the party fared poorly in the 2004 Serbian local elections in the municipality. After a party investigation, six local members, including Berkovits, were demoted to "supporting membership," without voting rights and without the ability to run for the executive. Available online sources do not indicate if Berkovits was politically active after this time.

== Electoral record ==
=== Provincial (Vojvodina) ===
2000 Vojvodina provincial election: Čoka
Candidate	Party	First round		Second round	
Candidate	Party	Votes	%	Votes	%
György Berkovits	Alliance of Vojvodina Hungarians–Democratic Opposition of Serbia (Affiliation: Alliance of Vojvodina Hungarians)	3,242	36.01	4,136	59.74
Milan Mihaljev	Serbian Radical Party	1,695	18.83		?
Mira Bošković	Socialist Party of Serbia–Yugoslav Left	1,634	18.15		?
other candidates?					
Total					

=== Local (Čoka) ===
1996 Čoka municipal election: Division 28
Candidate	Party	Votes	%
György Berkovits	Citizens' Group		elected in the second round
István Kelemen	Yugoslav Left		defeated in the second round
János Grigor	Vojvodina Hungarian Civic Movement		
Marko Mašulović	Socialist Party of Serbia		
József Morajkó	Citizens' Group		
Total			
Source: Grigor, Mašulović, and Morajkó are listed alphabetically.
