= Bobbie Berkowitz =

American nursing professor and dean

- Education: Case Western Reserve University; University of Washington
- Known for: Academic administration, Public health, Health disparity
- Awards: Member NAM; Fellow AAN
- Scientific career
- Fields: Public health nursing, health policy
- Workplaces: Columbia University; University of Washington; Washington State Department of Health
- Thesis: (1990)
- Website: nursing.columbia.edu/profile/bberkowitz

Bobbie Berkowitz is an American professor of nursing and dean emeritus of the School of Nursing at Columbia University. She is best known for her contributions improving public health nursing and health systems with a focus on health disparity.

Berkowitz earned her BS (1972) in nursing and her MS (1981) in nursing at University of Washington, and she earned her doctorate in 1990 from Case Western Reserve University.

Prior to joining Columbia University as Senior Vice President and Dean of Nursing in 2010, Berkowitz was a professor at University of Washington and Deputy Secretary of the Washington State Department of Health.

At Columbia University, Berkowitz was instrumental in the creation of a new facility to house the School of Nursing, that included the signature "Building the Future Gala" in honor of the 125th anniversary of the founding of the School.

As part of her efforts to strengthen healthcare systems, Berkowitz spoke against recommendations by the American Academy of Family Physicians and advocated for the role of the advanced practice registered nurse sharing, "There's a lot of research that nurse practitioners provide as good care if not better care than physicians in some cases." And in 2016, Columbia University opened a nurse practitioner primary care facility in Washington Heights, Manhattan.

In 2001, Berkowitz was inducted into the National Academy of Medicine. From 2014 to 2016, Berkowitz served as President of the American Academy of Nursing.
