= Berkovich tip =

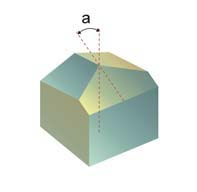
A Berkovich tip, with "a" denoting the half angle

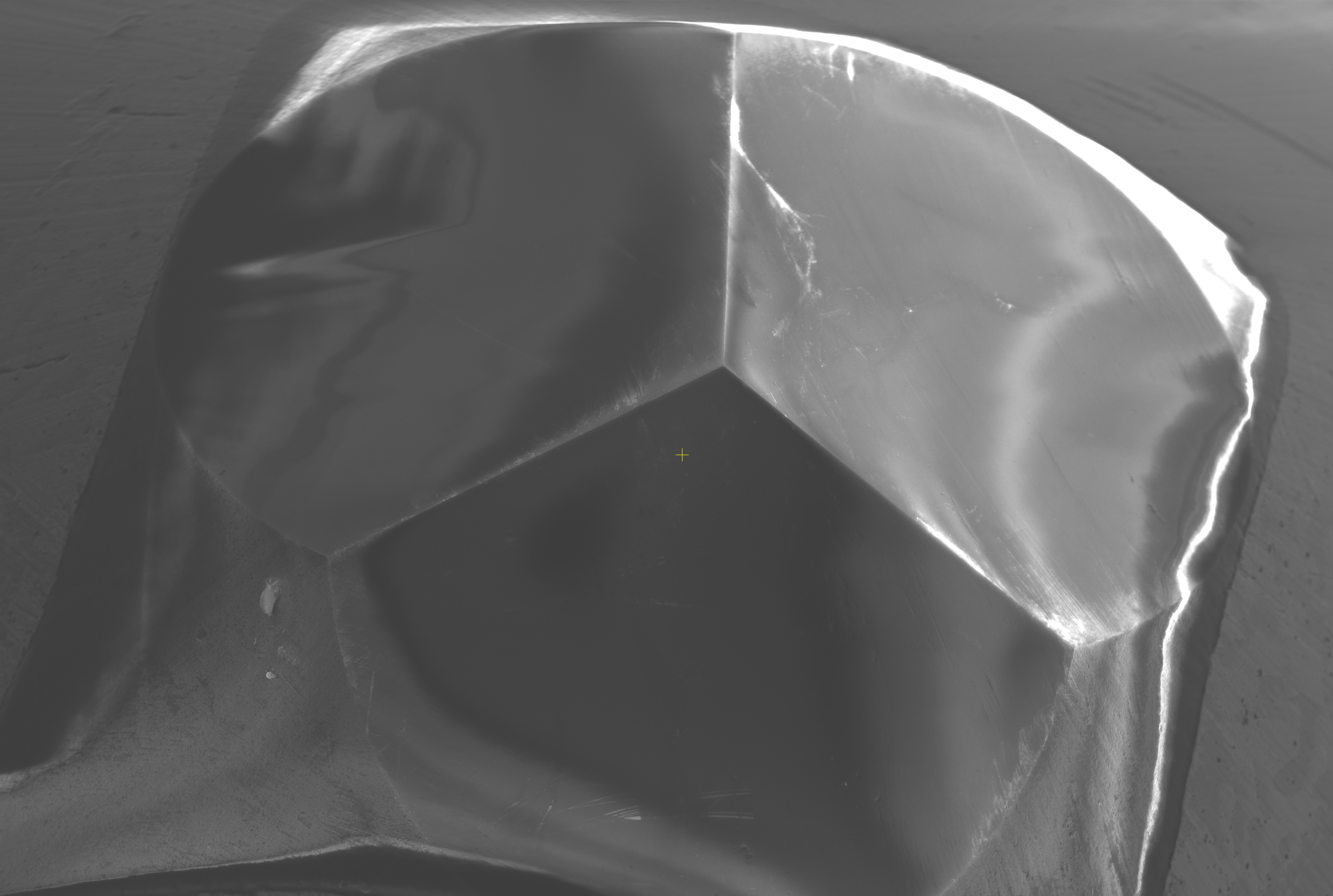
A scanning electron microscope image of a Berkovich tip used in a nanoindenter

A Berkovich tip is a type of nanoindenter tip used for testing the indentation hardness of a material. It is a three-sided pyramid which is geometrically self-similar. The popular Berkovich now has a very flat profile, with a total included angle of 142.3° and a half angle of 65.27°, measured from the axis to one of the pyramid flats. This Berkovich tip has the same projected area-to-depth ratio as a Vickers indenter. The original tip shape was invented by Russian scientist E. S. Berkovich in the USSR around 1950, which has a half angle of 65.03°.

As it is three-sided, it is easier to grind these tips to a sharp point and so is more readily employed for nanoindentation tests. It is typically used to measure bulk materials and films greater than 100 nanometres (3.9×10^{−6} in) thick.
