= Norbert Berkowitz =

Canadian scientist

- Born: 1924; Berlin, Germany
- Died: June 25, 2001
- Awards: Order of Canada

Norbert Berkowitz, CM (1924 – June 25, 2001) was a Canadian scientist involved in researching coal technology in conjunction with the Alberta Research Council and the University of Alberta.

Berkowitz was born in Berlin and lived in Germany for the first 15 years of his life. During World War II, he and his family fled to England, where received a Ph.D. in petroleum engineering from the University of London. In 1952, he moved to Edmonton and joined the Alberta Research Council. He joined the University of Alberta in 1979 in a teaching position and retired in 1988. In 1984 he was made a Member of the Order of Canada. He was killed in a car accident in 2001.

== Selected works ==
- Fossil Hydrocarbons: Chemistry and Technology, ISBN 0-12-091090-X (1997)
