= David B. Berkowitz =

American chemist

- Education: Harvard University; University of Chicago
- Title: Assistant Director, NSF Directorate for Mathematical and Physical Sciences; Cordes Professor of Chemistry, University of Nebraska–Lincoln
- Awards: Fellow of the American Association for the Advancement of Science (2015) Fellow of the American Chemical Society (2024) Fellow of the Alfred P. Sloan Foundation (1997)

David B. Berkowitz is an American chemist who currently serves as assistant director of the U.S. National Science Foundation's Directorate for Mathematical and Physical Sciences, where he oversees the NSF's funding of research and infrastructure in astronomy, chemistry, materials science, mathematics and physics. Berkowitz also holds an appointment as the Cordes Professor of Chemistry at the University of Nebraska–Lincoln, which he joined in 1991.

His research has explored problems at the interface of chemistry and biology, particularly via enzymology and organic chemistry. In his synthetically motivated research, this has included hybrid biocatalytic-synthetic organic chemical ventures and the use of enzymes to screen for the discovery of new chemistry. On the chemical biology side, it has included the design, synthesis and mechanistic study of enzyme inhibitors and the study of enzyme mechanisms, particularly for pyridoxal phosphate (PLP)-dependent enzymes and those involved in neuronal signaling.

== Education ==
Berkowitz earned a bachelor's degree from the University of Chicago, where he was inducted to Phi Beta Kappa and performed undergraduate research with Joseph Jarabak. He would go on to earn his doctorate in chemistry from Harvard University under the tutelage of Steven A. Benner, following his mentor to ETH Zurich (the Swiss Federal Institute of Technology). Following a two-year postdoctoral appointment at Yale University, where he worked on glycal-based carbohydrate chemistry and the synthesis of daunomycin analogs in the lab of Samuel J. Danishefsky, Berkowitz accepted a faculty position at the University of Nebraska–Lincoln.

== Academic career ==
The University of Nebraska–Lincoln promoted Berkowitz to full professor in 2005. He would later be named Willa Cather Professor of Chemistry (2011-2024) and then Elmer H. & Ruby M. Cordes Professor of Chemistry (2024–present).

Berkowitz's research has been funded by the National Science Foundation, the National Institutes of Health, the American Heart Association, the American Cancer Society, the U.S. Department of Energy, the Alfred P. Sloan Foundation and the U.S. Department of Defense, which has supported a collaborative effort to develop countermeasures for acute radiation syndrome. Thanks in part to that support, Berkowitz co-established the Nebraska Drug Discovery and Development Pipeline (ND3P), a research collective led by the University of Nebraska–Lincoln and the University of Nebraska Medical Center.

Throughout his career, Berkowitz has served as a visiting professor at several institutions, including the University of Rouen, the Max Planck Institute of Molecular Physiology, the Tokyo Institute of Technology and Paris Descartes University.

== Research foci, discoveries and applications ==
=== Fluorinated phosphonates/Phosphate mimics ===
The Berkowitz group has developed fluorinated phosphonate analogs of biological phosphates, including the first synthesis of the CF_{2}-phosphonate analogs of phosphoserine and phosphothreonine, among others. These "Teflon phosphates" are inert to phosphatase enzymes and thus can be used as tools to study signal transduction related to phosphorylation, including for the melatonin cycle and in the biology of the p53 tumor suppressor protein. Berkowitz and his team are also known for their work on α-monofluorinated phosphonates as "iso-acidic and stereochemically tunable" mimics of biological phosphates. This is part of a larger effort to utilize fluorinated analogs of biological molecules as both mechanistic and analytical chemistry tools.

=== Biocatalysis/Enzyme-assisted synthesis ===
The Berkowitz group has utilized enzymes to set the absolute stereochemistry in synthetic organic endeavors. This approach led to the enzyme-assisted total synthesis of the lignin natural products (-)-podophyllotoxin and (-)-picropodophyllin, as well as structurally related analogs of the important chemotherapeutic drug Etoposide, which acts as a topoisomerase II inhibitor.

Berkowitz and colleagues have also applied enzymes for dynamic reductive kinetic resolution (DYRKR) to effectively deracemize members of the profen family of non-steroidal anti-inflammatory drugs (NSAIDs), exploiting an archaeal hyperthermophilic enzyme that has been recognized as an emerging area of opportunity for synthesis.

His research has characterized a particularly effective workhorse enzyme, Clostridium acetobutylicum alcohol dehydrogenase. The enzyme exhibits broad substrate specificity, providing access to ω-hydroxy ester building blocks for pharmaceuticals, β-hydroxy-α,α-difluorinated phosphonates and novel side chain analogs for the Taxotère family of tubulin-stabilizing chemotherapeutic drugs via a DYRKR process. Other work has demonstrated that ketoreductase enzymes offer ready access to pharmaceutical building blocks, including the Corey and Trost intermediates for the synthesis of the anti-influenza drug Tamiflu.

=== In Situ Enzymatic Screening for reaction discovery/optimization ===
In 2002, Berkowitz pioneered the development of In Situ Enzymatic Screening, a technique that uses enzymes to process the products of a chemical reaction and, consequently, assist in the discovery of new chemical transformations and the optimization of known transformations. Berkowitz and his colleagues have since refined ISES and related screening approaches, allowing them to interrogate chemical reactions with both UV/visible spectrophotometry and the naked eye.

Among the most important chemistry uncovered with this approach is:

- the discovery of the first asymmetric allylic amination with a nickel catalyst
- the development of useful chiral salen ligands based on chiral elements derived from β-pinene and D-(carba)fructopyranose
- the identification of a useful bromorhodiation/carbocyclization transformation and its application to the synthesis of sesquiterpene lactone natural product cores
- the discovery of a new thiocyanopalladation/carbocyclization transformation with promise for diversity-oriented synthesis

=== PLP enzymes/Development of mechanism-based inhibitors ===
Berkowitz and his colleagues have long studied the mechanisms of important vitamin B_{6}- or pyridoxal phosphate (PLP)-dependent enzymes, along with the development of mechanism-based inhibitors for those enzymes. This has included the development of new chemistry to access quaternary, α-vinyl amino acids, α-(1'-fluoro)vinyl amino acids and α-(2'Z-fluoro)vinyl amino acids, as well as their interrogation as inactivators of PLP enzymes.

More recently, Berkowitz's research has examined PLP enzymes involved in neuronal signaling. These include cystathionine β-synthase, the enzyme responsible for biosynthesis of the important "gasotransmitter" H_{2}S in the brain, and human serine racemase, the enzyme that controls the biosynthesis of the NMDA receptor co-agonist D-serine, which is associated with learning and memory. Berkowitz and colleagues have also developed an assay to monitor the chemistry of PLP enzymes in great detail, particularly the partitioning of the central "carbanionic" or "quinonoid" intermediate formed in these active sites. His team applied the method to human serine racemase, both to study its mechanisms of action and to identify new inhibitors of the enzyme.

Collaborative work with the research groups of Irina Gutsche, Mariarita Bertoldi and Robert S. Phillips has shed light on the way that α-hydrazino acids, such as the anti-Parkinsonism drug carbidopa, inhibit their target PLP enzymes.

== National Science Foundation ==
Berkowitz was selected to direct the Division of Chemistry at the National Science Foundation in May 2020. Accepting the role shortly after the onset of the COVID-19 pandemic, he led a team of 40-plus employees while supervising the annual allocation of funds to chemistry research, infrastructure and education across the United States. He also spearheaded the creation of the Molecular Foundations for Biotechnology (MFB) program, a cross-disciplinary partnership to fund high-risk, high-reward biotech-related research.

In 2024, Berkowitz was selected to lead the NSF's Directorate for Mathematical and Physical Sciences, which encompasses the Divisions of Astronomical Sciences, Chemistry, Materials Research, Mathematical Sciences and Physics, along with interdisciplinary research of strategic importance. In the role, Berkowitz reports to the director of the NSF.

== Honors, awards and appointments ==
Berkowitz was named an Alfred P. Sloan Research Fellow in 1997, recognizing his achievements as an early-career scientist at the University of Nebraska–Lincoln. The American Association for the Advancement of Science, the world's largest general scientific society, would likewise recognize him as a fellow in 2015.

He was elected co-chair of the Biocatalysis Gordon Research Conference and has previously served as a member of the Chemical Sciences Roundtable and the Board on Chemical Sciences and Technology, both with the National Academy of Sciences. From 2021 to 2024, Berkowitz co-chaired the inaugural Sustainable Chemistry Strategy Team for the White House Office of Science Technology Policy (OSTP). He now co-chairs the OSTP's Subcommittee on Quantum Information Science.

In 2024, he became the first Nebraska-based researcher named a fellow of the American Chemical Society, which to date has bestowed that recognition on less than 1% of its 150,000-plus membership. He has also received numerous research and teaching awards from the University of Nebraska–Lincoln.
