= Philip B. =

American hair stylist

Philip B. is the professional name of Philip Berkovitz, an American hair stylist and entrepreneur who founded the Philip B. hair and skin care company. The label includes treatment and styling products for the hair and scalp as well as body treatment products.

== Biography ==
=== Career ===
Philip B. began his professional hair styling career as a teenager in his home state of Massachusetts. In 1984, he moved to Los Angeles and found work in salons frequented by Hollywood celebrities. Finding that commercial treatments were inadequate for healing over-processed hair common to movie actresses, Philip B. experimented with botanical blends of his own. He sourced ingredients for custom-blended essential oil formulations at local farmers' markets and herb shops. His first commercial formula, Philip B. Rejuvenating Oil, was first sold at Fred Segal in Los Angeles in 1992. His venture went nationwide a year later with placement at Neiman Marcus and Bergdorf Goodman. Today, Philip B. treatment and styling products are also sold online and in countries from Europe to the Middle East to Asia.

A four-step hair and scalp treatment created by Philip B. has been endorsed by Marina Rust in Vogue and by beauty editors of many other leading magazines. His role as CEO, product creator and educator for the company have been written about in publications including Vogue, Elle, Glamour, Lucky, InStyle, Town & Country, W and many international magazines, newspapers and beauty blogs. In (1999), Forbes placed Philip B.'s scalp treatment on their list of "100 Things Worth Every Penny." In 2014, Philip B. styled hair for models on Project Runway, Season 13, using products from his own line

His products have been used by a number of celebrities, such as Dyan Cannon, Linda Gray, Sharon Stone, Lena Olin, Madonna and Paul Newman. Other clients of note are Sandra Bullock, Robert Redford, Courtney Love, Gwyneth Paltrow, Lauren Bacall and Ronnie Wood.

Philip B. published the book Blended Beauty in 1995 to teach women to create their own beauty treatments using natural products in high concentrations. The book is currently out of print. At that time, his focus was on ingredients sourced in the United States. Later, he expanded his search to ingredients from around the world, including African shea butter and Russian amber, which became the basis for new Philip B. product lines.

=== Controversy ===
The Philip B. Peppermint & Avocado Volumizing and Clarifying Shampoo product was cited by the CEH, the Center for Environmental Health, as having a cancer-causing ingredient, cocamide DEA, a carcinogen, receiving a notice of violation from the California Safe Drinking Water and Toxic Enforcement Act. While the brand presents itself as a "botanicals" brand, it does not exclusively use botanical ingredients, and the brand admits on their FAQ page they are indeed not a "clean" brand.

== Personal life ==
In July 2013, Philip Berkovitz married artist/designer Michael Huober in Huober's hometown of Munich, Germany. Huober is creative director at Philip B. Botanicals, International. The couple lives in Southern California and Munich.
