= Bruce D. Berkowitz =

American author (born 1956)

Bruce D. Berkowitz (born May 11, 1956) is an American author who writes about military history, foreign affairs, and technology. He served in several positions at the U.S. Department of Defense and is best known for his books The New Face of War: How War Will Be Fought in the Twenty-First Century and Playfair: The True Story of the British Secret Agent Who Changed How We See the World

== Publications ==
- Playfair: The True Story of the British Secret Agent Who Changed How We See the World,(George Mason University Press, 2018)
- Strategic Advantage: Challengers, Competitors, and Threats to America's Future, (Georgetown University Press, 2008)
- The New Face of War: How war will Be Fought in the Twenty-First Century, (The Free Press, 2003)
