= Berković =

Berković is a Serbo-Croatian surname. It is attested since the Late Middle Ages. It may refer to:

- György Berkovits (born 14 July 1940), Serbian politician
- Haris Berković, Serbian singer, Grand Production
- Josip Berković (1885–1968), Mayor of Split 1928–29
- Zvonimir Berković (1928–2009), Croatian film director

== See also ==
- Berkovići, village in Bosnia and Herzegovina
- Berkovich, surname
- Berkovics, Hungarian surname
- Perković
