= Jay R. Berkovitz =

American historian

Jay R. Berkovitz is Professor of Judaic and Near Eastern Studies and director of the Center for Jewish Studies at the University of Massachusetts Amherst.

Jay Berkovitz completed his Ph.D. from Brandeis University in 1983. He taught at Spertus College in Chicago, Bar Ilan University, Hebrew College, Hebrew University of Jerusalem, Touro College, Trinity College, and the University of Connecticut Storrs. At Amherst he is an adjunct member of both the History Department and the Department of French and Italian Studies.

Berkovitz has published widely on Jewish social and intellectual history of modern Europe, with an emphasis on communal governance, family, law and ritual, and rabbinic scholarship. One of his recent projects, supported by a Faculty Research Grant, focuses on the adjudication of civil disputes in early modern rabbinic courts.

== Published works ==
=== Author ===
- Berkovitz, Jay R (1989). The shaping of Jewish identity in nineteenth-century France. Wayne State University Press. ISBN 0-8143-2011-2. OCLC 20012964.
- —— (1982). French Jewry and the ideology of Régénération to 1848 (Ph.D. thesis). OCLC 9676193.
- —— (1982). French Jewry and the ideology of Régénération to 1848. OCLC 238919265.
- —— (2004). Rites and passages : the beginnings of modern Jewish culture in France, 1650-1860. University of Pennsylvania Press. ISBN 0-8122-3816-8. OCLC 54966624.
- —— (2007). Tradition and Revolution: Jewish Culture in Early Modern France (in Hebrew). Mercaz Zalman Shazar. ISBN 978-965-227-222-5. OCLC 122349040.
- —— (2007). RMasoret u-mahpekhah : tarbut Yehudit be-Tsarefat be-reshit ha-ʻet ha-ḥadashah (in Hebrew). Merkaz Zalman Shazar le-toldot Yiśraʼel. ISBN 978-965-227-222-5. OCLC 122349040.
- —— (2004). "Ritual and Modernity: Rethinking Jewish Emancipation" (PDF). In L. Ehrlich, S. Bolozky; R. Rothstein; M. Schwartz; J. Berkovitz; J. Young (eds.). Textures and Meaning: Thirty Years of Judaic Studies at the University of Massachusetts Amherst. Department of Judaic and Near Eastern Studies, University of Massachusetts Amherst. pp. 4–27. Archived from the original (PDF) on 2012-10-11.
