= Vladimir Berkovich =

Israeli mathematician

Vladimir G. Berkovich
- 'ולדימיר ברקוביץ
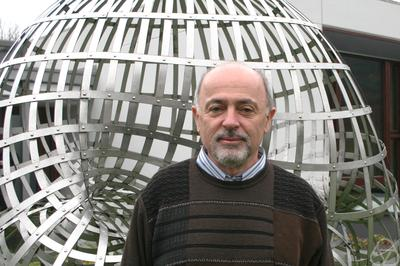
- Known for: Berkovich space
- Scientific career
- Fields: Mathematics
- Institutions: Weizmann Institute of Science
- Doctoral advisor: Yuri I. Manin

Vladimir Berkovich (Hebrew: 'ולדימיר ברקוביץ) is a mathematician at the Weizmann Institute of Science who introduced Berkovich spaces. His Ph.D. advisor was Yuri I. Manin. Berkovich was a visiting scholar at the Institute for Advanced Study in 1991-92 and again in the summer of 2000.

In 1998 he was an invited speaker of the International Congress of Mathematicians in Berlin. In 2012 he became a fellow of the American Mathematical Society.

== Selected publications ==
- Berkovich, Vladimir G. (1990), Spectral theory and analytic geometry over non-Archimedean fields, Mathematical Surveys and Monographs, vol. 33, Providence, R.I.: American Mathematical Society, ISBN 978-0-8218-1534-2, MR 1070709
