= George Mason University Press =

University press

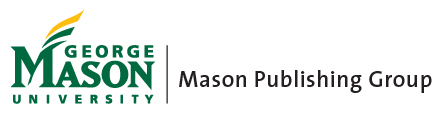
- Parent company: George Mason University Publishing Group
- Country of origin: United States
- Headquarters location: Fairfax, Virginia
- Distribution: University of Virginia Press: Longleaf Services (US)
- Key people: Andrew Rouner (Director)
- Publication types: Books, manuscripts
- Nonfiction topics: History of the DC Metro Area and Northern Virginia, Public Policy, International Affairs, Higher Education
- Imprints: George Mason University Press
- Official website: publishing.gmu.edu/press/

George Mason University Press is a university press affiliated with George Mason University, which is located in Fairfax County, Virginia. The press was established to publish academic journals, monographs, and digital textbooks, among other works. Its catalog is currently printed by the University of Virginia Press, which in turn currently uses the Longleaf Services program of the University of North Carolina Press for distribution within the United States. The press is currently an affiliate of the Association of University Presses, to which it was admitted as an introductory member in 2014.

== Publishing areas ==
The press publishes on a range of topics with a special focus on the history, politics, and culture of Northern Virginia and the wider DC metropolitan area, as well as topics such as public policy, international affairs, and higher education.

== See also ==
- List of English-language book publishing companies
- List of university presses
