= Yuli Berkovich =

Russian biologist

Yuli Berkovich (1944 – 2012) was a scientist who performed experiments with seed germination in zero gravity, among others, on the International Space Station. The seedlings germinated, but died a few days later due to not having any soil or nutrients, and from capillary action.
