= Monroe Berkowitz =

American academic

Monroe Berkowitz (March 19, 1919 - November 15, 2009) was Professor of Economics at Rutgers University, New Brunswick, New Jersey, where he was chair for many years, and director of the Bureau of Economic Research.

Berkowitz was a leading authority on the economics of disability and rehabilitation in public programs, private disability insurance, and public and private rehabilitation systems in the U.S. and other countries. Berkowitz developed the "Ticket to Work" program that was enacted into law in 1999.

He was the 2006 recipient of the National Academy of Social Insurance Robert M. Ball Award for outstanding achievements in social insurance.

== Early life and education ==
Berkowitz was born on March 19, 1919. A graduate of Ohio University (1942), he served with the War Labor Board, and worked briefly for the United Auto Workers. Berkowitz received his Master's and Doctoral degrees in economics from Columbia University.

He served as Director of Special Studies, President's Commission on Workers' Compensation, Director of the Rutgers University Bureau of Economic Research, Director of Research at Rehabilitation International, a member of the International Return to Work Group, organizer of the New Jersey Disability Research Consortium of the New Jersey Developmental Disabilities Council, and Founding Member of the National Academy of Social Insurance. He also served as consultant to numerous government and other agencies including the Social Security Administration, the World Health Organization, the American Association for the Advancement of Science, and Rehabilitation International.

He held Fulbright and other fellowships, and worked in England, India, New Zealand, and elsewhere throughout the world.

== Works ==
Berkowitz authored and co-authored 15 books, more than 50 reports, proceedings, chapters, etc., and scores of articles including: Economics, Experience and Analysis (with Mitchell, Murad, and Bagley, 1951), and The Economic Consequences of Traumatic Spinal Cord Injury (with Harvey and Greene). His work Disability and the Labor Market with Anne Hill (1986) is cited as an important reference, and won the Book of the Year Award from the President's Committee of Employment of Persons with Disabilities, and his 1987 work, Permanent Partial Disability and Workers' Compensation, with John Burton, won the George Kulp Award of the American Risk and Insurance Association.

He was a member of the National Academy of Arbitrators, the National Academy of Social Insurance, the American Economic Association, and the Industrial Relations Research Association.

== Death ==
Berkowitz died on November 15, 2009.

== See also ==
- Rutgers University
