= Ira Berkowitz =

American writer of crime fiction

- Born: October 8, 1939 (age 86); New York City, U.S.
- Occupation: Writer
- Writing career
- Genre: Crime fiction

Ira Berkowitz (born October 8, 1939, in Brooklyn, New York) is an American writer of crime fiction. His Jackson Steeg Mystery Series novels are set in Hell's Kitchen.

Berkowitz's debut novel Family Matters, published in 2006, won the Washington Irving Award for Literary Merit, and was a USA Today Top Ten Summer Read selection. He followed up with his second Washington Irving Award for his novel, Old Flame published in 2008.

The third novel in the Jackson Steeg series, Sinners' Ball published in December 2009, won the Shamus Award for Best Original Paperback Crime Fiction Novel of 2009.

== Biography ==
Ira Berkowitz's path to writing fiction took thirty years to complete. Growing up in Brooklyn, Berkowitz dreamed of a career in medicine or law. But advertising beckoned. When he retired, he began to write. His first attempt at a novel garnered fifty rejections. A few were encouraging. So, he kept at it.

Berkowitz's novels explore the themes of family, loyalty, and asymmetrical justice – an all too familiar condition where the cards are stacked against the weak.

His novels are set in Hell's Kitchen.

Berkowitz lives with his wife in Westchester County, New York.

== Novels ==
- 2006 Family Matters
- 2008 Old Flame
- 2009 Sinners’ Ball

== Major characters ==
- Jackson Steeg Ex-NYPD Homicide Detective.Graduate of Most Precious Blood parochial school,
- Dave Steeg Jackson's brother. Controls the Hell's Kitchen Rackets,
- Anthony Steeg Dave's son. Attended Dartmouth,
- Luce Guidry Steeg's former partner. The only person who uses his first name,
- Dominic Steeg Retired NYPD Homicide Detective. Father of Jackson and Dave,
- DeeDee Santos Steeg's favorite kid,
- Justin Hapner DeeDee's boyfriend,
- Ginny Doyle Steeg's ex-wife,
- Allie Lebow Steeg's new flame. Advertising copywriter,
- Nick D'Amico Mobster. Owns Feeney's, Steeg's favorite hangout,
- Zev Barak Russian mobster. Known as The Golem,
- Kenny Apple Mobster. Refuses to kill on the Sabbath,
- Hell's Kitchen Steeg's neighborhood,

== Honors and awards ==
Washington Irving Award For Literary Merit – Family Matters, Old Flame,

Shamus Award. Best Original Paperback Crime Fiction Novel of 2009 – Sinners' Ball
