= Restricted power series =

Formal power series with coefficients tending to 0

In algebra, the ring of restricted power series is the subring of a formal power series ring that consists of power series whose coefficients approach zero as degree goes to infinity. Over a non-archimedean complete field, the ring is also called a Tate algebra. Quotient rings of the ring are used in the study of a formal algebraic space as well as rigid analysis, the latter over non-archimedean complete fields.

Over a discrete topological ring, the ring of restricted power series coincides with a polynomial ring; thus, in this sense, the notion of "restricted power series" is a generalization of a polynomial.

== Definition ==
Let A be a linearly topologized ring, separated and complete and $\{ I_{\lambda} \}$ the fundamental system of open ideals. Then the ring of restricted power series is defined as the projective limit of the polynomial rings over $A/I_{\lambda}$:

$A \langle x_1, \dots, x_n \rangle = \varprojlim_{\lambda} A/I_{\lambda}[x_1, \dots, x_n]$.

In other words, it is the completion of the polynomial ring $A[x_1, \dots, x_n]$ with respect to the filtration $\{ I_{\lambda}[x_1, \dots, x_n] \}$. Sometimes this ring of restricted power series is also denoted by $A \{ x_1, \dots, x_n \}$.

Clearly, the ring $A \langle x_1, \dots, x_n \rangle$ can be identified with the subring of the formal power series ring $A[[x_1, \dots, x_n]]$ that consists of series $\sum c_{\alpha} x^{\alpha}$ with coefficients $c_{\alpha} \to 0$; i.e., each $I_\lambda$ contains all but finitely many coefficients $c_{\alpha}$. Also, the ring satisfies (and in fact is characterized by) the universal property: for (1) each continuous ring homomorphism $A \to B$ to a linearly topologized ring $B$, separated and complete and (2) each elements $b_1, \dots, b_n$ in $B$, there exists a unique continuous ring homomorphism

$$A \langle x_1, \dots, x_n \rangle \to B, \, x_i \mapsto b_i$$

extending $A \to B$.

== Tate algebra ==
In rigid analysis, when the base ring A is the valuation ring of a complete non-archimedean field $(K, | \cdot |)$, the ring of restricted power series tensored with $K$,

$$T_n = K \langle \xi_1, \dots \xi_n \rangle = A \langle \xi_1, \dots, \xi_n \rangle \otimes_A K$$

is called a Tate algebra, named for John Tate. It is equivalently the subring of formal power series $k[[\xi_1, \dots, \xi_n]]$ which consists of series convergent on $\mathfrak{o}_{\overline{k}}^n$, where $\mathfrak{o}_{\overline{k}} := \{x \in \overline{k} : |x| \leq 1\}$ is the valuation ring in the algebraic closure $\overline{k}$.

The maximal spectrum of $T_n$ is then a rigid-analytic space that models an affine space in rigid geometry.

Define the Gauss norm of $f = \sum a_{\alpha} \xi^{\alpha}$ in $T_n$ by

$$\|f\| = \max_{\alpha} |a_\alpha|.$$

This makes $T_n$ a Banach algebra over k; i.e., a normed algebra that is complete as a metric space. With this norm, any ideal $I$ of $T_n$ is closed and thus, if I is radical, the quotient $T_n/I$ is also a (reduced) Banach algebra called an affinoid algebra.

Some key results are:

- (Weierstrass division) Let $g \in T_n$ be a $\xi_n$-distinguished series of order s; i.e., $g = \sum_{\nu = 0}^{\infty} g_{\nu} \xi_n^{\nu}$ where $g_{\nu} \in T_{n-1}$, $g_s$ is a unit element and $| g_s | = \|g\| > |g_v |$ for $\nu > s$. Then for each $f \in T_n$, there exist a unique $q \in T_n$ and a unique polynomial $r \in T_{n-1}[\xi_n]$ of degree $< s$ such that
  $f = qg + r.$
- (Weierstrass preparation) As above, let $g$ be a $\xi_n$-distinguished series of order s. Then there exist a unique monic polynomial $f \in T_{n-1}[\xi_n]$ of degree $s$ and a unit element $u \in T_n$ such that $g = f u$.
- (Noether normalization) If $\mathfrak{a} \subset T_n$ is an ideal, then there is a finite homomorphism $T_d \hookrightarrow T_n/\mathfrak{a}$.

As consequence of the division, preparation theorems and Noether normalization, $T_n$ is a Noetherian unique factorization domain of Krull dimension n. An analog of Hilbert's Nullstellensatz is valid: the radical of an ideal is the intersection of all maximal ideals containing the ideal (we say the ring is Jacobson).

== Results ==
Results for polynomial rings such as Hensel's lemma, division algorithms (or the theory of Gröbner bases) are also true for the ring of restricted power series. Throughout the section, let A denote a linearly topologized ring, separated and complete.

- (Hensel) Let $\mathfrak m \subset A$ be a maximal ideal and $\varphi : A \to k := A/\mathfrak{m}$ the quotient map. Given an $F$ in $A\langle \xi \rangle$, if $\varphi(F) = gh$ for some monic polynomial $g \in k[\xi]$ and a restricted power series $h \in k\langle \xi \rangle$ such that $g, h$ generate the unit ideal of $k \langle \xi \rangle$, then there exist $G$ in $A[\xi]$ and $H$ in $A\langle \xi \rangle$ such that
  $F = G H, \, \varphi(G) = g, \varphi(H) = h$.

== See also ==
- Weierstrass preparation theorem
