= Lelong =

Lelong is a French surname. Notable people with the surname include:

- Charles Lelong (1891–1970), French track and field athlete
- Daniel Lelong (1933–2025), French gallerist of modern art and book publisher
- Jacques Lelong (1665–1721), French bibliographer
- Lucien Lelong (1889–1958), French couturier
- Pierre Lelong (1912–2011), French mathematician
- Pierre Emile Lelong (1908–1984), French painter
- Jean-Marc Lelong (1949–2004), French comics author known for his serial Carmen Cru; see Jean-Marc Lofficier

== See also ==
- Lelong number, an invariant of a point of a complex analytic variety
