= Siu's semicontinuity theorem =

In complex analysis, the Siu semicontinuity theorem implies that the Lelong number of a closed positive current on a complex manifold is semicontinuous. More precisely, the points where the Lelong number is at least some constant form a complex subvariety. This was conjectured by Harvey & King (1972) and proved by Siu (1973, 1974). Demailly (1987) generalized Siu's theorem to more general versions of the Lelong number.
