= List of inventions and discoveries of Neolithic China =

China has been the source of many innovations, scientific discoveries and inventions. Below is an alphabetical list of inventions and discoveries made by Neolithic cultures of China and those of its prehistorical early Bronze Age before the palatial civilization of the Shang dynasty (c. 1650 – c. 1050 BC). These include the Bronze Age Erlitou culture and the semi-legendary Xia dynasty that, unlike the Shang, is not yet confirmed to have existed with evidence of contemporary texts.

The contemporaneous Peiligang and Pengtoushan cultures represent the oldest Neolithic cultures of China and were formed around 7000 BC. Some of the first inventions of Neolithic China include semilunar and rectangular stone knives, stone hoes and spades, the cultivation of millet and the soybean, the refinement of sericulture, rice cultivation, the creation of pottery with cord-mat-basket designs, the creation of pottery vessels and pottery steamers and the development of ceremonial vessels and scapulimancy for purposes of divination. The British sinologist Francesca Bray argues that the domestication of the ox and buffalo during the Longshan culture (c. 3000 – c. 2000 BC) period, the absence of Longshan-era irrigation or high-yield crops, full evidence of Longshan cultivation of dry-land cereal crops which gave high yields "only when the soil was carefully cultivated," suggest that the plow was known at least by the Longshan culture period and explains the high agricultural production yields which allowed the rise of Chinese civilization during the Shang dynasty. Later inventions such as the multiple-tube seed drill and the heavy moldboard iron plow enabled China to sustain a much larger population through greater improvements in agricultural output.

== Inventions and discoveries ==
- Bell: Clapper-bells made of pottery have been found in several archaeological sites. The earliest metal bells, with one found in the Taosi site, and four in the Erlitou site, dated to about 2000 BC, may have been derived from the earlier pottery prototype. Early bells not only have an important role in generating metal sound, but arguably played a prominent cultural role. With the emergence of other kinds of bells during the Shang dynasty (c. 1600 – c. 1050 BC), they were relegated to subservient functions; at Shang and Zhou sites, they are also found as part of the horse-and-chariot gear and as collar-bells of dogs.
- Coffin, wooden: The earliest evidence of wooden coffin remains, dated at 5000 BC, was found in the Tomb 4 at Beishouling, Shaanxi. Clear evidence of a wooden coffin in the form of a rectangular shape was found in Tomb 152 in an early Banpo site. The Banpo coffin belongs to a four-year-old girl, measuring 1.4 m (4.5 ft) by 0.55 m (1.8 ft) and 3–9 cm thick. As many as 10 wooden coffins have been found from the Dawenkou culture (4100–2600 BC) site at Chengzi, Shandong. The thickness of the coffin, as determined by the number of timber frames in its composition, also emphasized the level of nobility, as mentioned in the Classic of Rites, Xunzi and Zhuangzi. Examples of this have been found in several Neolithic sites; the double coffin, the earliest of which was found in the Liangzhu culture (3400–2250 BC) site at Puanqiao, Zhejiang, consists of an outer and an inner coffin, while the triple coffin, with its earliest finds from the Longshan culture (3000–2000 BC) sites at Xizhufeng and Yinjiacheng in Shandong, consists of two outer and one inner coffins.
- Cookware and pottery vessel: The earliest known pottery vessels, dating to 20,000 to 19,000 BP, were excavated in Xianrendong Cave located in the Jiangxi province of China. The presence of scorched surfaces on the pot shards indicates that they were likely used as cookware. An excavation of Yuchanyan Cave in Hunan province found pottery dating to 18,300 to 15,430 BP. The manufacture of pottery by hunter-gatherers in East Asia predates the emergence of agriculture in that region by 10,000 years, challenging the traditionally held belief that pottery resulted from the Neolithic Revolution.

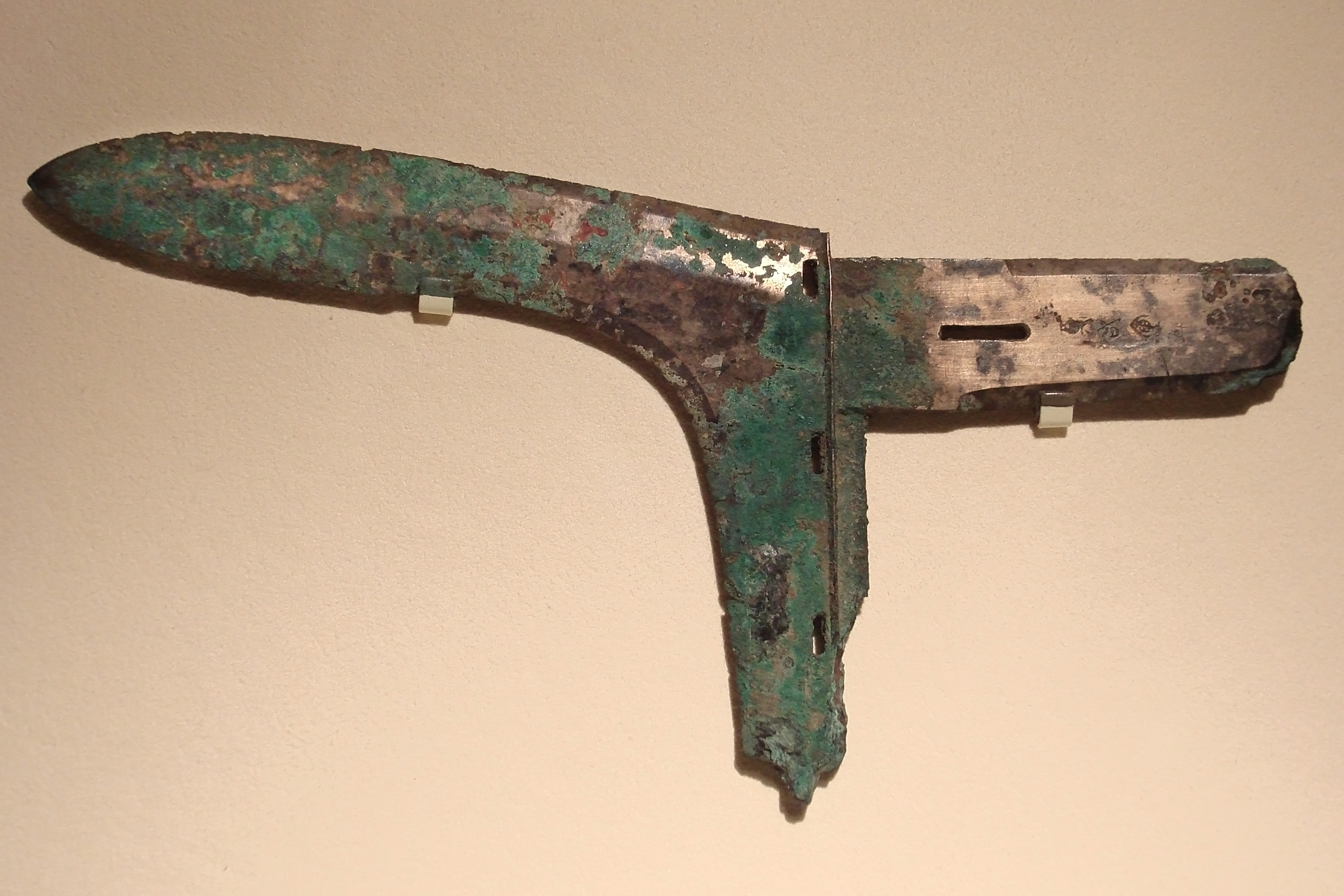
A bronze dagger-axe from the State of Han, Warring States period (403–221 BC); this type of weapon has existed in China since the Neolithic period

- Dagger-axe: The dagger-axe or ge was developed from agricultural stone implement during the Neolithic, dagger-axe made of stone are found in the Longshan culture (3000–2000 BC) site at Miaodian, Henan. It also appeared as ceremonial and symbolic jade weapon at around the same time, two being dated from about 2500 BC, are found at the Lingjiatan site in Anhui. The first bronze ge appeared at the early Bronze Age Erlitou site, where two were being found among the over 200 bronze artifacts (as of 2002) at the site, three jade ge were also discovered from the same site. Total of 72 bronze ge in Tomb 1004 at Houjiazhuang, Anyang, 39 jade ge in tomb of Fu Hao and over 50 jade ge at Jinsha site were found alone. It was the basic weapon of Shang (c. 1600 – 1050 BC) and Zhou (c.1050–256 BC) infantry, although it was sometimes used by the "striker" of charioteer crews. It consisted of a long wooden shaft with a bronze knife blade attached at a right angle to the end. The weapon could be swung down or inward in order to hook or slash, respectively, at an enemy. By the early Han dynasty (202 BC – 220 AD), military use of the bronze ge had become limited (mostly ceremonial); they were slowly phased out during the Han dynasty by iron spears and iron ji halberds.
- Deepwater drilling: Some of the earliest evidence of water wells are located in China. The Chinese discovered and made extensive use of deep drilled groundwater for drinking. The Chinese text The Book of Changes, originally a divination text of the Western Zhou dynasty (1046 -771 BC), contains an entry describing how the ancient Chinese maintained their wells and protected their sources of water. Archaeological evidence and old Chinese documents reveal that the prehistoric and ancient Chinese had the aptitude and skills for digging deep water wells for drinking water as early as 6000 to 7000 years ago. A well excavated at the Hemudu excavation site was believed to have been built during the Neolithic era. The well was cased by four rows of logs with a square frame attached to them at the top of the well. 60 additional tile wells southwest of Beijing are also believed to have been built around 600 BC for drinking and irrigation.

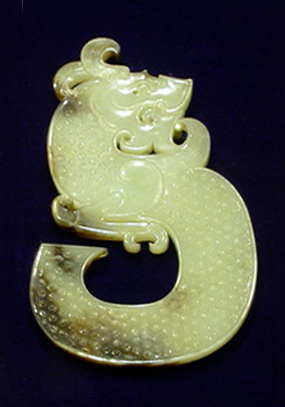
A Jade dragon dating back to the Western Han dynasty (202 BC – 9 AD).

- Lacquer: Lacquer was used in China since the Neolithic period and came from a substance extracted from the lac tree found in China. A red wooden bowl, which is believed to be the earliest known lacquer container, was unearthed at a Hemudu (c. 5000 BC – c. 4500 BC) site. The British sinologist and historian Michael Loewe says coffins at many early Bronze Age sites seem to have been lacquered, and articles of lacquered wood may also have been common, but the earliest well-preserved examples of lacquer come from Eastern Zhou dynasty (771 – 256 BC) sites. However, Wang Zhongshu disagrees, stating that the oldest well-preserved lacquerware items come from a Xiajiadian (c.2000 – c.1600 BC) site in Liaoning excavated in 1977, the items being red lacquered vessels in the shape of Shang dynasty bronze gu vessels. Wang states that many lacquerware items from the Shang dynasty (c.1600 – c.1050 BC), such as fragments of boxes and basins, were found, and had black designs such as the Chinese dragon and taotie over a red background. Queen Fu Hao (died c. 1200 BC) was buried in a lacquered wooden coffin. There were three imperial workshops during the Han dynasty (202 BC – 220 AD) established solely for the purpose of crafting lacquerwares; fortunately for the historian, Han lacquerware items were inscribed with the location of the workshop where they were produced and the date they were made, such as a lacquerware beaker found in the Han colony in northwestern Korea with the inscription stating it was made in a workshop near Chengdu, Sichuan and dated precisely to 55 AD.
- Millet cultivation: The discovery in northern China of domesticated varieties of broomcorn and foxtail millet from 8500 BC, or earlier, suggests that millet cultivation might have predated that of rice in parts of Asia. Clear evidence of millet began to cultivate by 6500 BC at sites of Cishan, Peiligang and Jiahu. Archaeological remains from Cishan sum up to over 300 storage pits, 80 with millet remains, with a total millet storage capacity estimated for the site of about 100,000 kg of grain. By 4000 BC, most Yangshao areas were using an intensive form of foxtail millet cultivation, complete with storage pits and finely prepared tools for digging and harvesting the crop. The success of the early Chinese millet farmers is still reflected today in the DNA of many modern East Asian populations, such studies have shown that the ancestors of those farmers probably arrived in the area between 30,000 and 20,000 BP, and their bacterial haplotypes are still found in today populations throughout East Asia.
- Rowing oar: Rowing oars have been used since the early Neothilic period; a canoe-shaped pottery and six wooden oars dating from the 6000 BC have been discovered in a Hemudu culture site at Yuyao, Zhejiang. In 1999, an oar measuring 63.4 cm (2 ft) in length, dating from 4000 BC, has also been unearthed at Ishikawa Prefecture, Japan.
- Plastromancy: The earliest use of turtle shells comes from the archaeological site in Jiahu site. The shells, containing small pebbles of various size, colour and quantity, were drilled with small holes, suggesting that each pair of them was tied together originally. Similar finds have also been found in the Dawenkou burial sites of about 4000–3000 BC, as well as in Henan, Sichuan, Jiangsu and Shaanxi. The turtle-shell shakers for the most part are made of the shell of land turtles, identified as Cuora flavomarginata. Archaeologists believe that these shells were used either as rattles in ceremonial dances, shamantic healing tools or ritual paraphernalia for divinational purposes.
- Ploughshare, triangular-shaped: Triangular-shaped stone ploughshares are found at the sites of Majiabang culture dated to 3500 BC around Lake Tai. Ploughshares have also been discovered at the nearby Liangzhu and Maqiao sites roughly dated to the same period. David R. Harris says this indicates that more intensive cultivation in fixed, probably bunded, fields had developed by this time. According to Mu Yongkang and Song Zhaolin's classification and methods of use, the triangular plough assumed many kinds and were the departure from the Hemudu and Luojiajiao spade, with the Songze small plough in mid-process. The post-Liangzhu ploughs used draft animals.
- Pottery steamer: Archaeological excavations show that using steam to cook began with the pottery cooking vessels known as yan steamers; a yan composed of two vessel, a zeng with perforated floor surmounted on a pot or caldron with a tripod base and a top cover. The earliest yan steamer dating from about 5000 BC was unearthed in the Banpo site. In the lower Yangzi River, zeng pots first appeared in the Hemudu culture (5000–4500 BC) and Liangzhu culture (3200–2000 BC) and used to steam rice; there are also yan steamers unearthed in several Liangzhu sites, including 3 found at the Chuodun (綽墩) and Luodun (羅墩) sites in southern Jiangsu. In the Longshan culture (3000–2000 BC) site at Tianwang in western Shandong, 3 large yan steamers were discovered.
- Pottery urn: The first evidence of pottery urn dating from about 7000 BC comes from the early Jiahu site, where a total of 32 burial urns are found, another early finds are in Laoguantai, Shaanxi. There are about 700 burial urns unearthed over the Yangshao (5000–3000 BC) areas and consisting more than 50 varieties of form and shape. The burial urns were used mainly for children, but also sporadically for adults, as shown in the finds at Yichuan, Lushan and Zhengzhou in Henan. A secondary burials containing bones from child or adult are found in the urns in Hongshanmiao, Henan. Small hole was drilled in most of the child and adult burial urns, and is believed to enable the spirit to access. It is recorded in the Classic of Rites that the earthenware coffins were used in the time of legendary period, the tradition of burying in pottery urns lasted until the Han dynasty (202 BC–220 AD) when it gradually disappeared.

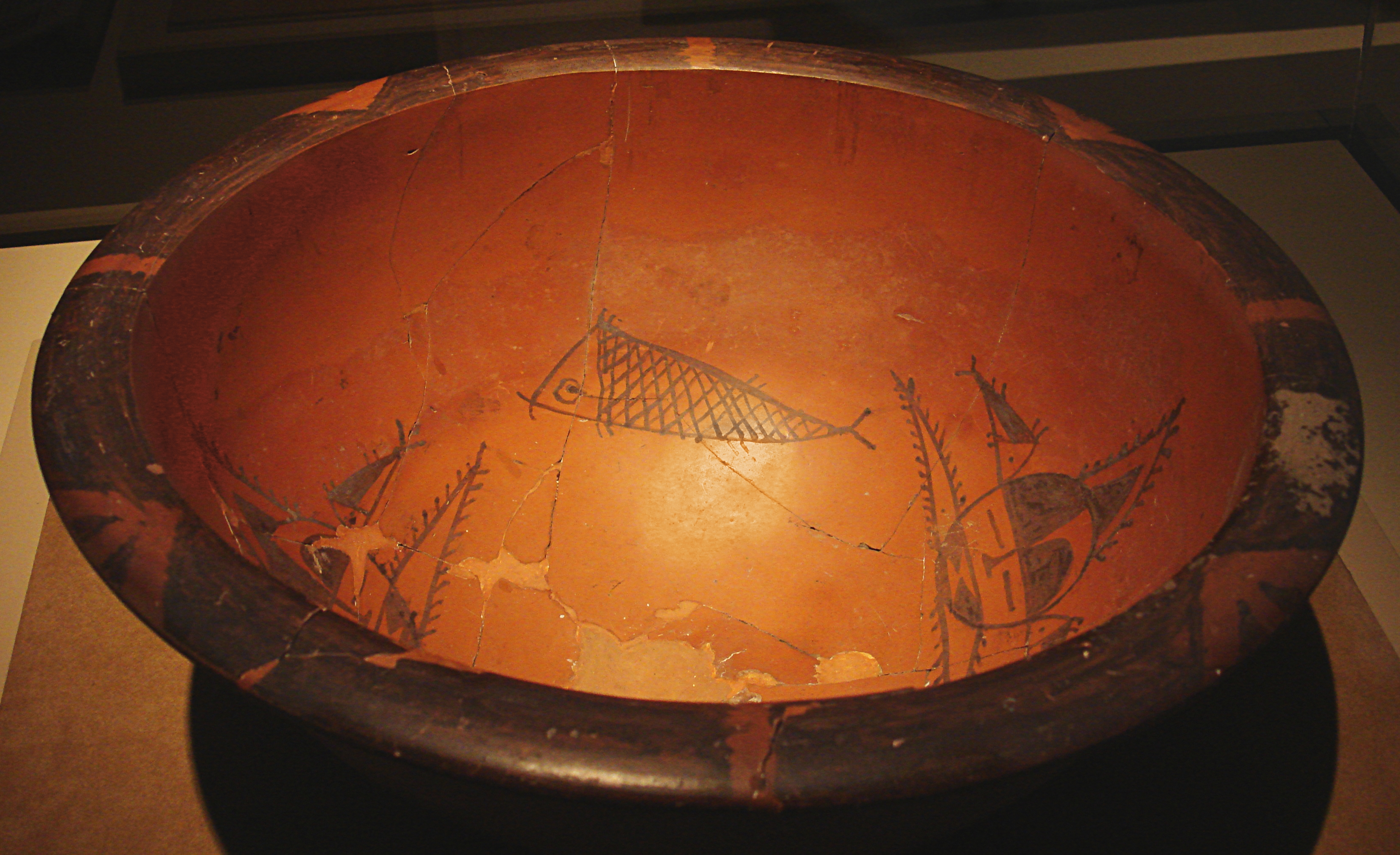
A basin cover for a "coffin urn" from the Neolithic Yangshao culture (c. 5000 – c. 3000 BC), used for the burial of a child, from Shaanxi

- Rice cultivation: In 2002, a Chinese and Japanese group reported the discovery in eastern China of fossilised phytoliths of domesticated rice apparently dating back to 11,900 BC or earlier. However, phytolith data are controversial in some quarters due to potential contamination problems. It is likely that demonstrated rice was cultivated in the middle Yangtze Valley by 7000 BC, as shown in finds from the Pengtoushan culture at Bashidang, Changde, Hunan. By 5000 BC, rice had been domesticated at Hemudu culture near the Yangtze Delta and was being cooked in pots. Although millet remained the main crop in northern China throughout history, several sporadic attempts were made by the state to introduce rice around the Bohai Gulf as early as the 1st century.
- Saltern: One of the earliest salterns for the harvesting of salt is argued to have taken place on Lake Yuncheng, Shanxi by 6000 BC. Strong archaeological evidence of salt making dating to 2000 BC is found in the ruins of Zhongba at Chongqing.

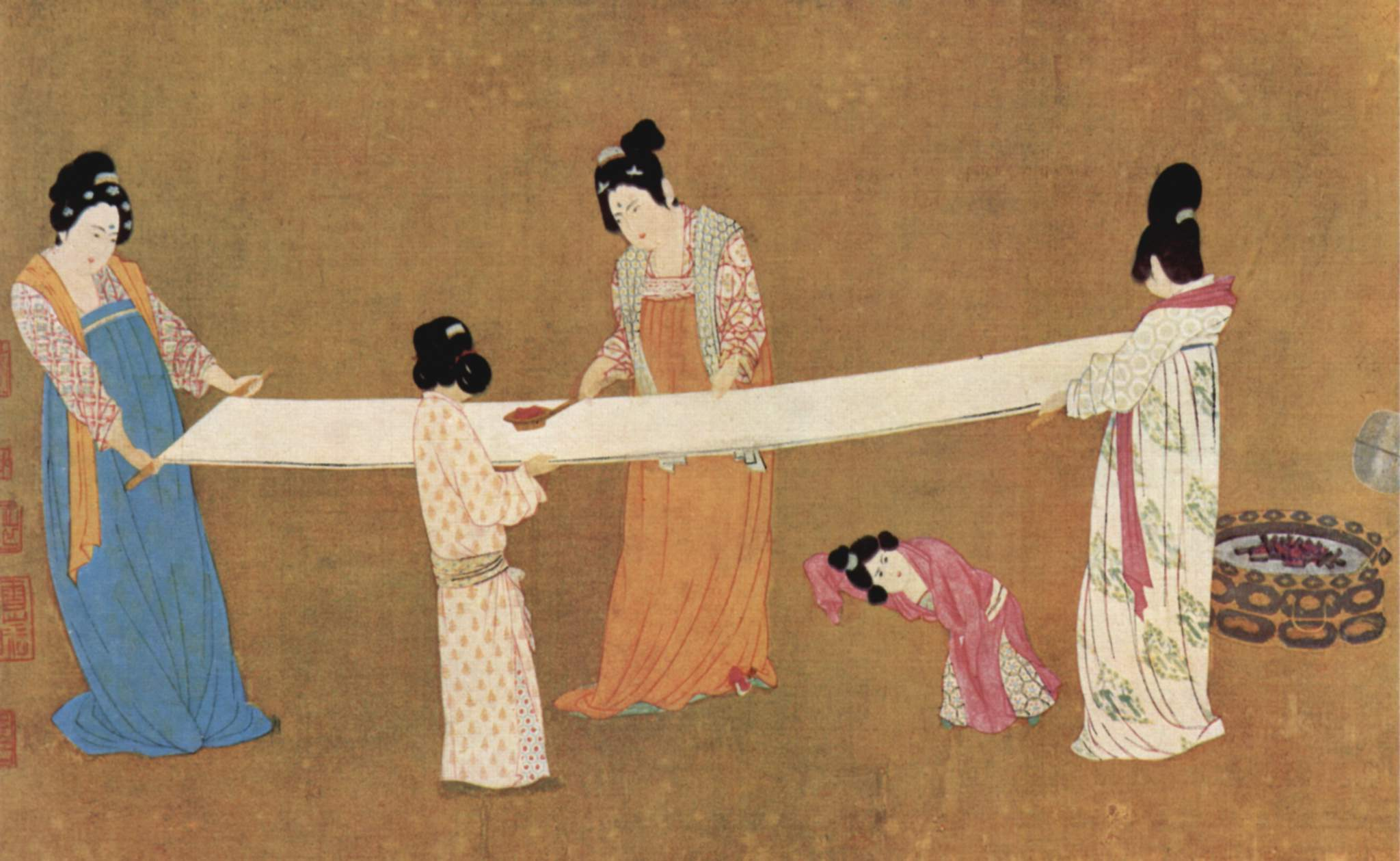
Medieval Chinese women processing new silk, early 12th century painting in the style of Zhang Xuan, Song dynasty

- Sericulture: Sericulture is the production of silk from silkworms. The oldest silk found in China comes from the Chinese Neolithic period and is dated to about 3630 BC, found in Henan province. Silk items excavated from the Liangzhu culture site at Qianshanyang, Wuxing District, Zhejiang date to roughly 2570 BC, and include silk threads, a braided silk belt and a piece of woven silk. A bronze fragment found at the Shang dynasty (c. 1600 – c. 1050 BC) site at Anyang (or Yinxu) contains the first known written reference to silk.
- Soybean cultivation: The cultivation of soybeans began in the eastern half of northern China by 2000 BC, but is almost certainly much older. Liu et al. (1997) stated that soybean originated in China and was domesticated about 3500 BC. By the 5th century, soybeans were being cultivated in much of East Asia, but the crop did not move beyond this region until well into the 20th century. Written records of the cultivation and use of the soybean in China date back at least as far as the Western Zhou dynasty.
- Wet field cultivation and paddy field: Wet field cultivation, or the paddy field, was developed in China. The earliest paddy field dates to 6280 BP, based on carbon dating of the grains of rice and soil organic matter found at the Chaodun site in Kushan County. Paddy fields have also been excavated by archaeologists at Caoxieshan, a site of the Neolithic Majiabang culture.

== See also ==
- History of science and technology in China
- List of Chinese inventions
- List of Chinese discoveries
