= Pierre Lelong =

French mathematician

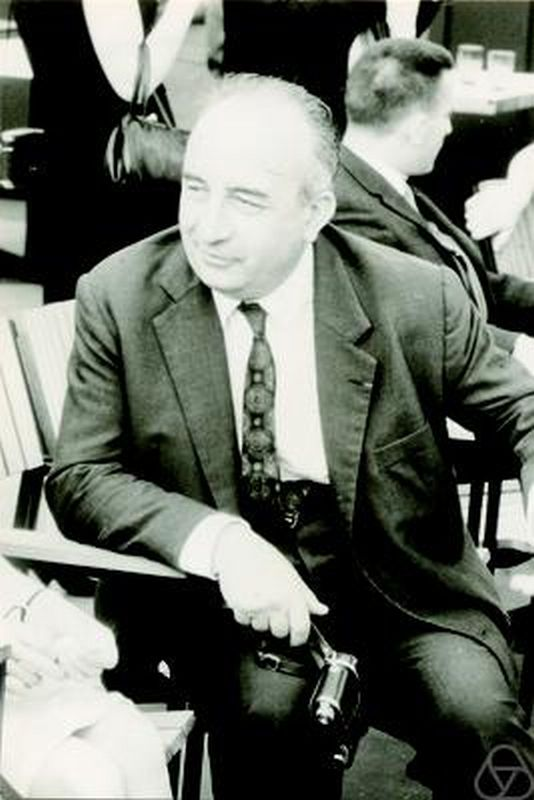
Lelong in 1967

Pierre Lelong (14 March 1912 Paris – 12 October 2011) was a French mathematician who introduced the Poincaré–Lelong equation, the Lelong number and the concept of plurisubharmonic functions.

== Career ==
Lelong earned his doctorate in 1941 from the École Normale Supérieure, under the supervision of Paul Montel. On 5 June 1981 Lelong received an honorary doctorate from the Faculty of Mathematics and Science at Uppsala University, Sweden. He became a member of the French Academy of Sciences in 1985.

Lelong has made many pioneering contributions in mathematics. Especially of great impact is his work on the Poincaré-Lelong equation, closed positive currents and Lelong numbers. The best way to understand this very important part of his work is to look at it from the historic perspective of constructing meromorphic functions on abstractly defined complex manifolds and see how his contributions fit in a pivotal way into the global landscape in the theory of several complex variables.
The theory of several complex variables studies complex-analytic objects such as holomorphic and meromorphic functions and maps, complex-analytic subvarieties, holomorphic vector bundles, and coherent analytic sheaves. When a complex-analytic manifold or space is projective algebraic, by definition it is embedded inside a complex projective space and there are many complex- analytic objects on it which are constructed from those on the complex projective space. When a complex-analytic manifold is abstractly defined by piecing together local holomorphic charts, the construction of complex-analytic objects on it is a problem of fundamental importance.

== Personal life ==
He married another mathematician, Jacqueline Ferrand, in 1947; they separated in 1977.
