= History of science and technology in China =

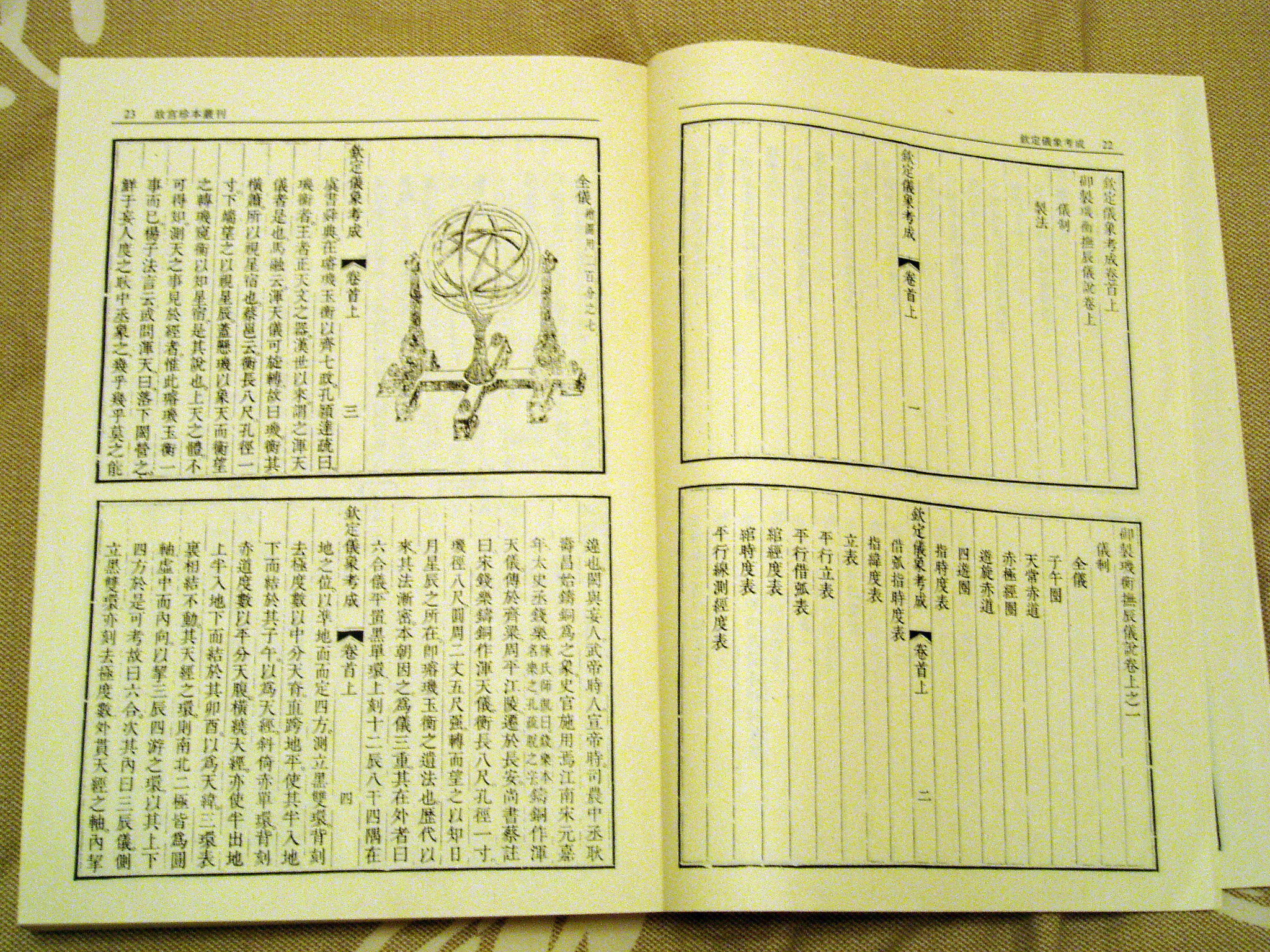
Instructions for making astronomical instruments from the time of the Qing dynasty.

Ancient Chinese scientists and engineers made significant scientific innovations, findings and technological advances across various scientific disciplines including the natural sciences, engineering, medicine, military technology, mathematics, geology and astronomy.

Among the earliest inventions were the abacus, the sundial, and the Kongming lantern. The Four Great Inventions – the compass, gunpowder, papermaking, and printing – were among the most important technological advances, only known to Europe by the end of the Middle Ages 1000 years later. The Tang dynasty (AD 618–906) in particular was a time of great innovation. A good deal of exchange occurred between Western and Chinese discoveries up to the Qing dynasty.

The Jesuit China missions of the 16th and 17th centuries introduced Western science and astronomy, while undergoing its own scientific revolution, at the same time bringing Chinese knowledge of technology back to Europe. In the 19th and 20th centuries the introduction of Western technology was a major factor in the modernization of China. Much of the early Western work in the history of science in China was done by Joseph Needham and his Chinese partner, Lu Gwei-djen.

== Ancient China ==
The Warring States period began 2500 years ago at the time of the invention of the crossbow. Needham notes that the invention of the crossbow "far outstripped the progress in defensive armor", which made the wearing of armor useless to the princes and dukes of the states. At this time, there were also many nascent schools of thought in China—the Hundred Schools of Thought (諸子百家), scattered among many polities. The schools served as communities which advised the rulers of these states. Mo Di (墨翟 Mozi, 470 BCE–c. 391 BCE) introduced concepts useful to one of those rulers, such as defensive fortification. One of these concepts, fa (法 principle or method) was extended by the School of Names (名家 Ming jia, ming=name), which began a systematic exploration of logic. The development of a school of logic was cut short by the defeat of Mohism's political sponsors by the Qin dynasty, and the subsumption of fa as law rather than method by the Legalists.

Needham further notes that the Han dynasty, which conquered the short-lived Qin, were made aware of the need for law by Lu Jia and by Shusun Tong, as defined by the scholars, rather than the generals.

You conquered the empire on horseback, but from horseback you will never succeed in ruling it.

— Lu Jia

Derived from Taoist philosophy, one of the newest longstanding contributions of the ancient Chinese are in Traditional Chinese medicine, including acupuncture and herbal medicine. The practice of acupuncture can be traced back as far as the 1st millennium BC and some scientists believe that there is evidence that practices similar to acupuncture were used in Eurasia during the early Bronze Age.

Early Taoism cautioned against using technologies that could create chaos or "sully the spirit." A story in the Zhuangzi about a master gardener who refuses to use a well-sweep warns against the use of "clever machines," suggesting that those walking the righteous path should avoid them.

Using shadow clocks and the abacus (both invented in the ancient Near East before spreading to China), the Chinese were able to record observations, documenting the first recorded solar eclipse in 2137 BC, and making the first recording of any planetary grouping in 500 BC. These claims, however, are highly disputed and rely on much supposition. The Book of Silk was the first definitive atlas of comets, written c. 400 BC. It listed 29 comets (referred to as sweeping stars) that appeared over a period of about 300 years, with renderings of comets describing an event its appearance corresponded to.

In architecture, the pinnacle of Chinese technology manifested itself in the Great Wall of China, under the first Chinese Emperor Qin Shi Huang between 220 and 200 BC. Typical Chinese architecture changed little from the succeeding Han dynasty until the 19th century. The Qin dynasty also developed the crossbow, which later became the mainstream weapon in Europe. Several remains of crossbows have been found among the soldiers of the Terracotta Army in the tomb of Qin Shi Huang.

== Han dynasty ==
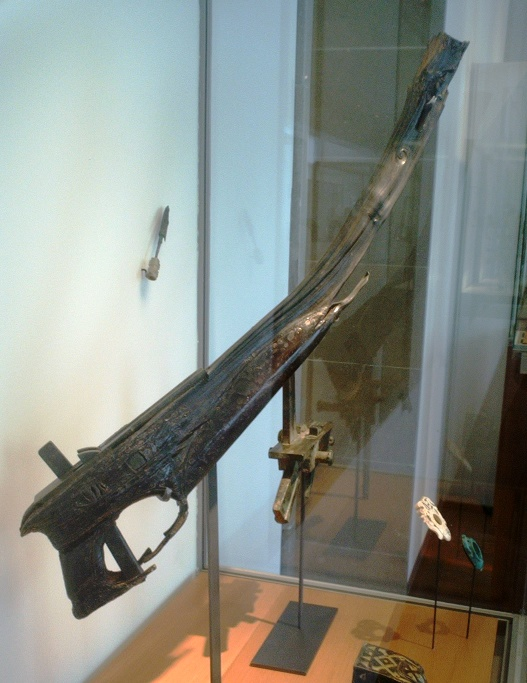
Remains of a Chinese crossbow, 2nd century BC

The Eastern Han dynasty scholar and astronomer Zhang Heng (78–139 AD) invented the first water-powered rotating armillary sphere (the first armillary sphere having been invented by the Greek Eratosthenes), and catalogued 2,500 stars and over 100 constellations. In 132, he invented the first seismological detector, called the "Houfeng Didong Yi" ("Instrument for inquiring into the wind and the shaking of the earth"). According to the History of Later Han Dynasty (25–220 AD), this seismograph was an urn-like instrument, which would drop one of eight balls to indicate when and in which direction an earthquake had occurred. On June 13, 2005, Chinese seismologists announced that they had created a replica of the instrument.

The mechanical engineer Ma Jun (c. 200–265 AD) was another impressive figure from ancient China. Ma Jun improved the design of the silk loom, designed mechanical chain pumps to irrigate palatial gardens, and created a large and intricate mechanical puppet theatre for Emperor Ming of Wei, which was operated by a large hidden waterwheel. However, Ma Jun's most impressive invention was the south-pointing chariot, a complex mechanical device that acted as a mechanical compass vehicle. While the exact mechanism is unclear, scholars think it incorporated the use of a differential gear in order to apply equal amount of torque to wheels rotating at different speeds, a device that is found in all modern automobiles.

Sliding calipers were invented in China almost 2,000 years ago. The Chinese civilization was the earliest civilization to experiment successfully with aviation, with the kite and Kongming lantern (proto Hot air balloon) being the first flying machines.

== Four Great Inventions ==
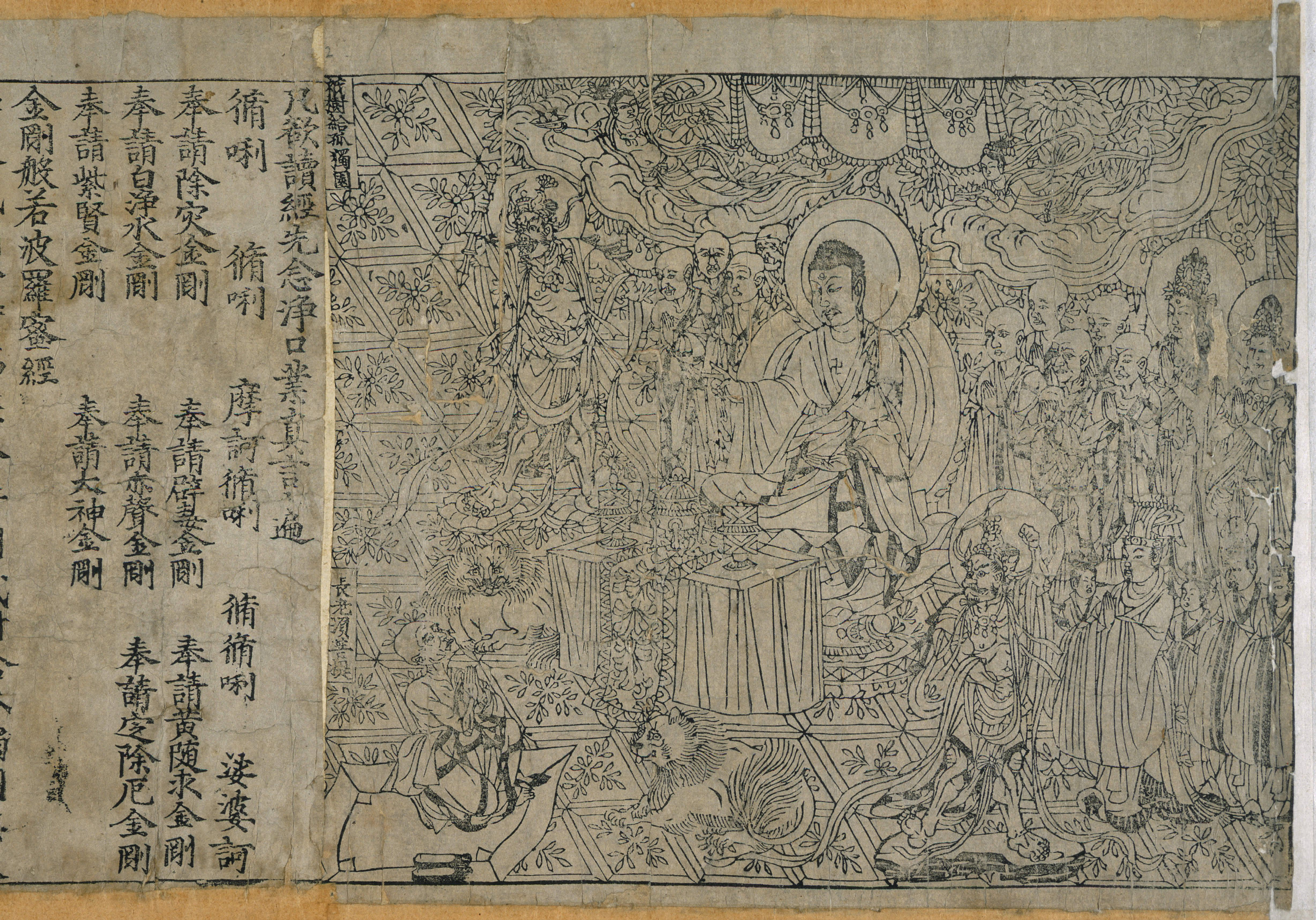
The intricate frontispiece of the Diamond Sutra from Tang dynasty China, 868 AD (British Library)

The "Four Great Inventions" (simplified Chinese: 四大发明; traditional Chinese: 四大發明; pinyin: sì dà fāmíng) are the compass, gunpowder, papermaking and printing. Paper and printing were developed first. Printing was recorded in China in the Tang dynasty, although the earliest surviving examples of printed cloth patterns date to before 220. Buddhists were among the earliest adopters of print technology.

Pin-pointing the development of the compass can be difficult: the magnetic attraction of a needle is attested by the Louen-heng, composed between AD 20 and 100, although the first undisputed magnetized needles in Chinese literature appear in 1086.

By AD 300, Ge Hong, an alchemist of the Jin dynasty, recorded the chemical reactions caused when saltpetre, pine resin and charcoal were heated together, in Book of the Master of the Preservations of Solidarity. Another report, from c. 850 AD,says that some people "heated together sulfur, realgar and saltpeter with honey; smoke and flames result, so that their hands and faces have been burnt, and even the whole house where they were working burned down."

These four discoveries had an enormous impact on the development of Chinese civilization and a far-ranging global impact. Gunpowder, for example, spread to the Arabs in the 13th century and thence to Europe. According to English philosopher Francis Bacon, writing in Novum Organum:

Printing, gunpowder and the compass: These three have changed the whole face and state of things throughout the world; the first in literature, the second in warfare, the third in navigation; whence have followed innumerable changes, in so much that no empire, no sect, no star seems to have exerted greater power and influence in human affairs than these mechanical discoveries.

—

One of the most important military treatises of all Chinese history was the Huo Long Jing written by Jiao Yu in the 14th century. For gunpowder weapons, it outlined the use of fire arrows and rockets, fire lances and firearms, land mines and naval mines, bombards and cannons, two stage rockets, along with different compositions of gunpowder, including 'magic gunpowder', 'poisonous gunpowder', and 'blinding and burning gunpowder' (refer to his article).

For the 11th century invention of ceramic movable type printing by Bi Sheng (990–1051), it was enhanced by the wooden movable type of Wang Zhen in 1298 and the bronze metal movable type of Hua Sui in 1490.

== China's Scientific Revolution ==
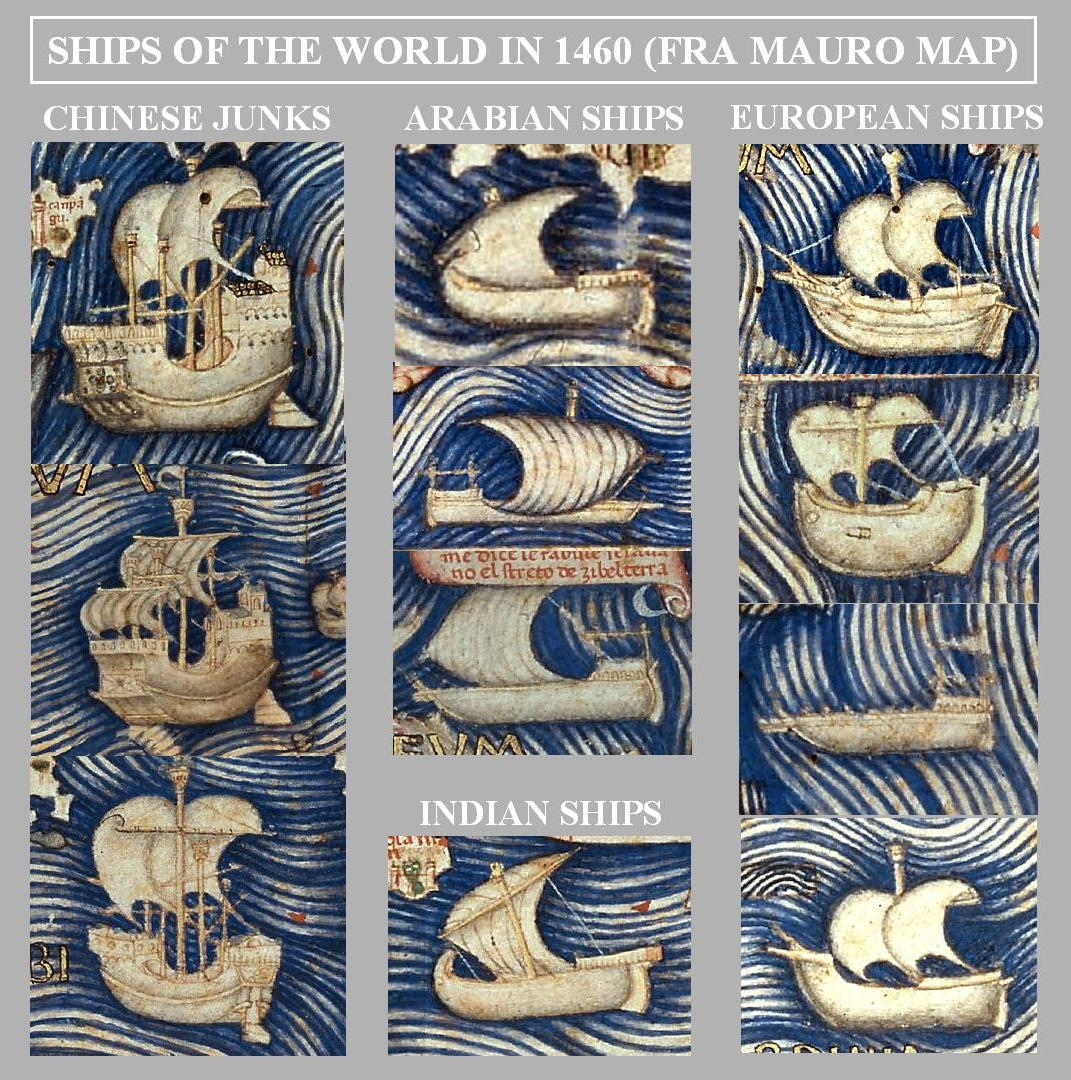
Ships of the world in 1460 (Fra Mauro map). Chinese junks are described as very large, three- or four-masted ships.

Among the engineering accomplishments of early China were matches, dry docks, the double-action piston pump, cast iron, the iron plough, the horse collar, the multi-tube seed drill, the wheelbarrow, the suspension bridge, the parachute, natural gas as fuel, the raised-relief map, the propeller, the sluice gate, and the pound lock. The Tang dynasty (AD 618–907) and Song dynasty (AD 960–1279) in particular were periods of great innovation.

In the 7th century, book-printing was developed in China, Korea and Japan, using delicate hand-carved wooden blocks to print individual pages. The 9th century Diamond Sutra is the earliest known printed document. Movable type was also used in China for a time, but was abandoned because of the number of characters needed; it would not be until Johannes Gutenberg that the technique was reinvented in a suitable environment.

In addition to gunpowder, the Chinese also developed improved delivery systems for the Byzantine weapon of Greek fire, Meng Huo You and Pen Huo Qi first used in China c. 900. Chinese illustrations were more realistic than in Byzantine manuscripts, and detailed accounts from 1044 recommending its use on city walls and ramparts show the brass container as fitted with a horizontal pump, and a nozzle of small diameter. The records of a battle on the Yangtze near Nanjing in 975 offer an insight into the dangers of the weapon, as a change of wind direction blew the fire back onto the Song forces.

=== Song dynasty ===
The Song dynasty (960–1279) brought a new stability for China after a century of civil war, and started a new area of modernisation by encouraging examinations and meritocracy. The first Song Emperor created political institutions that allowed a great deal of freedom of discourse and thought, which facilitated the growth of scientific advance, economic reforms, and achievements in arts and literature. Trade flourished both within China and overseas, and the encouragement of technology allowed the mints at Kaifeng and Hangzhou to gradually increase in production. In 1080, the mints of Emperor Shenzong had produced 5 billion coins (roughly 50 per Chinese citizen), and the first banknotes were produced in 1023. These coins were so durable that they would still be in use 700 years later, in the 18th century.

There were many famous inventors and early scientists in the Song dynasty period. The statesman Shen Kuo is best known for his book known as the Dream Pool Essays (1088 AD). In it, he wrote of use for a drydock to repair boats, the navigational magnetic compass, and the discovery of the concept of true north (with magnetic declination towards the North Pole). Shen Kuo also devised a geological theory for land formation, or geomorphology, and theorized that there was climate change in geological regions over an enormous span of time.

The equally talented statesman Su Song was best known for his engineering project of the Astronomical Clock Tower of Kaifeng, by 1088 AD. The clock tower was driven by a rotating waterwheel and escapement mechanism. Crowning the top of the clock tower was the large bronze, mechanically driven, rotating armillary sphere. In 1070, Su Song also compiled the Ben Cao Tu Jing (Illustrated Pharmacopoeia, original source material from 1058 to 1061 AD) with a team of scholars. This pharmaceutical treatise covered a wide range of other related subjects, including botany, zoology, mineralogy, and metallurgy.

Chinese astronomers were the first to record observations of a supernova, the first being the SN 185, recorded during the Han dynasty. Chinese astronomers made two more notable supernova observations during the Song dynasty: the SN 1006, the brightest recorded supernova in history; and the SN 1054, making the Crab Nebula the first astronomical object recognized as being connected to a supernova explosion.

==== Archaeology ====
During the early half of the Song dynasty (960–1279), the study of archaeology developed out of the antiquarian interests of the educated gentry and their desire to revive the use of ancient vessels in state rituals and ceremonies. This and the belief that ancient vessels were products of 'sages' and not common people was criticized by Shen Kuo, who took an interdisciplinary approach to archaeology, incorporating his archaeological findings into studies on metallurgy, optics, astronomy, geometry, and ancient music measures. His contemporary Ouyang Xiu (1007–1072) compiled an analytical catalogue of ancient rubbings on stone and bronze, which Patricia B. Ebrey says pioneered ideas in early epigraphy and archaeology. In accordance with the beliefs of the later Leopold von Ranke (1795–1886), some Song gentry—such as Zhao Mingcheng (1081–1129)—supported the primacy of contemporaneous archaeological finds of ancient inscriptions over historical works written after the fact, which they contested to be unreliable in regard to the former evidence. Hong Mai (1123–1202) used ancient Han dynasty era vessels to debunk what he found to be fallacious descriptions of Han vessels in the Bogutu archaeological catalogue compiled during the latter half of Huizong's reign (1100–1125).

==== Geology and climatology ====
In addition to his studies in meteorology, astronomy, and archaeology mentioned above, Shen Kuo also made hypotheses in regards to geology and climatology in his Dream Pool Essays of 1088, specifically his claims regarding geomorphology and climate change. Shen believed that land was reshaped over time due to perpetual erosion, uplift, and deposition of silt, and cited his observance of horizontal strata of fossils embedded in a cliffside at Taihang as evidence that the area was once the location of an ancient seashore that had shifted hundreds of miles east over an enormous span of time. Shen also wrote that since petrified bamboos were found underground in a dry northern climate zone where they had never been known to grow, climates naturally shifted geographically over time.

==== Chemistry ====
Until the Song dynasty, Chinese medicine classified drugs under the system of the Zhenghe bencao (Herbal of the Zhenghe Era):

1. Superior drugs, associated with immortality, were used for the realization of vital powers
2. Medium drugs that enrich one's nature
3. Inferior drugs were those used to treat diseases

These early forms of drugs were made using primitive methods, usually just simple dried herbs, or unprocessed minerals. They were developed into combinations known as "elixirs of immortality". These early magical practices, supported by the imperial courts of Qin Shi Huang (259–210 BCE) and Emperor Wu (156–87 BCE) eventually led to the first observations of chemistry in ancient China. Chinese alchemists searched for ways to make cinnabar, gold and other minerals water soluble so they could be ingested, such as using a solution of potassium nitrate in vinegar . Solubilzation of cinnabar was found to occur only if an impurity (chloride ion) was present. Gold also was soluble when iodate was present in crude niter deposits.

=== Mongol transmission ===
Mongol rule under the Yuan dynasty saw technological advances from an economic perspective, with the first mass production of paper banknotes by Kublai Khan in the 13th century. Numerous contacts between Europe and the Mongols occurred in the 13th century, particularly through the unstable Franco-Mongol alliance. Chinese corps, expert in siege warfare, formed an integral part of the Mongol armies campaigning in the West. In 1259–1260 military alliance of the Franks knights of the ruler of Antioch, Bohemond VI and his father-in-law Hetoum I with the Mongols under Hulagu, in which they fought together for the conquests of Muslim Syria, taking together the city of Aleppo, and later Damascus. William of Rubruck, an ambassador to the Mongols in 1254–1255, a personal friend of Roger Bacon, is also often designated as a possible intermediary in the transmission of gunpowder know-how between the East and the West. The compass is often said to have been introduced by the Master of the Knights Templar Pierre de Montaigu between 1219 and 1223, from one of his travels to visit the Mongols in Persia.

Chinese and Arabic astronomy intermingled under Mongol rule. Muslim astronomers worked in the Chinese Astronomical Bureau established by Kublai Khan, while some Chinese astronomers also worked at the Persian Maragha observatory. Before this, in ancient times, Indian astronomers had lent their expertise to the Chinese court.

=== Theory and hypothesis ===
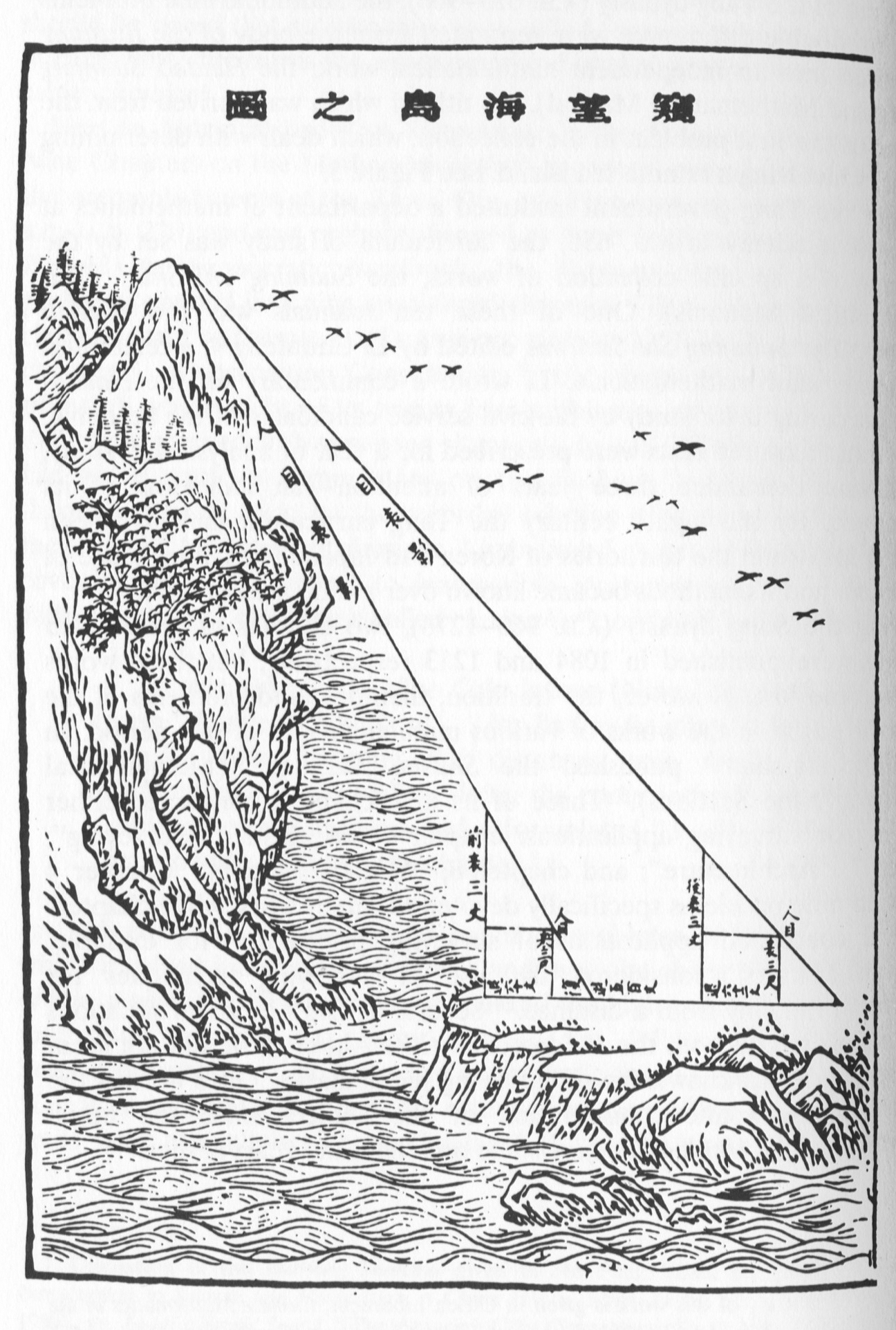
A 1726 illustration of Haidao Suanjing, written by Liu Hui in the 3rd century

As Toby E. Huff notes, pre-modern Chinese science developed precariously without solid scientific theory, while there was a lacking of consistent systemic treatment in comparison to contemporaneous European works such as the Concordance and Discordant Canons by Gratian of Bologna (fl. 12th century). This drawback to Chinese science was lamented even by the mathematician Yang Hui (1238–1298), who criticized earlier mathematicians such as Li Chunfeng (602–670) who were content with using methods without working out their theoretical origins or principle, stating:

The men of old changed the name of their methods from problem to problem, so that as no specific explanation was given, there is no way of telling their theoretical origin or basis.

—

Despite this, Chinese thinkers of the Middle Ages proposed some hypotheses which are in accordance with modern principles of science. Yang Hui provided theoretical proof for the proposition that the complements of the parallelograms which are about the diameter of any given parallelogram are equal to one another. Sun Sikong (1015–1076) proposed the idea that rainbows were the result of the contact between sunlight and moisture in the air, while Shen Kuo (1031–1095) expanded upon this with description of atmospheric refraction. Shen believed that rays of sunlight refracted before reaching the surface of the Earth, hence the appearance of the observed Sun from Earth did not match its exact location. Coinciding with the astronomical work of his colleague Wei Pu, Shen and Wei realized that the old calculation technique for the mean Sun was inaccurate compared to the apparent Sun, since the latter was ahead of it in the accelerated phase of motion, and behind it in the retarded phase. Shen supported and expanded upon beliefs earlier proposed by Han dynasty (202 BCE – 220 CE) scholars such as Jing Fang (78–37 BCE) and Zhang Heng (78–139 CE) that lunar eclipse occurs when the Earth obstructs the sunlight traveling towards the Moon, a solar eclipse is the Moon's obstruction of sunlight reaching Earth, the Moon is spherical like a ball and not flat like a disc, and moonlight is merely sunlight reflected from the Moon's surface. Shen also explained that the observance of a full moon occurred when the Sun's light was slanting at a certain degree and that crescent phases of the moon proved that the Moon was spherical, using a metaphor of observing different angles of a silver ball with white powder thrown onto one side. Although the Chinese accepted the idea of spherical-shaped heavenly bodies, the concept of a spherical Earth (as opposed to a flat Earth) was not accepted in Chinese thought until the works of Italian Jesuit Matteo Ricci (1552–1610) and Chinese astronomer Xu Guangqi (1562–1633) in the early 17th century.

The terminology of "science", in the sense of a distinct field, began developing in China in the 1850s. The existing term gewu zhizhi or gezhi (meaning the investigation of things and the extension of knowledge) was adapted to mean "science". Some intellectuals criticized this usage, contending that gezhi was too rooted in classical learning to stand in for the more modern concept of science.

In the 1890s, the Japanese neologism for "science" was adapted into Chinese as kagaku or kexue; it began to replace the previous usage of gezhi. In the 1900s, schools began distinguishing concepts of ziran kexue ("natural sciences") from shehui kexue ("social sciences").

=== Pharmacology ===
There were noted advances in traditional Chinese medicine during the Middle Ages. Emperor Gaozong (reigned 649–683) of the Tang dynasty (618–907) commissioned the scholarly compilation of a materia medica in 657 that documented 833 medicinal substances taken from stones, minerals, metals, plants, herbs, animals, vegetables, fruits, and cereal crops. In his Bencao Tujing ('Illustrated Pharmacopoeia'), the scholar-official Su Song (1020–1101) not only systematically categorized herbs and minerals according to their pharmaceutical uses, but he also took an interest in zoology. For example, Su made systematic descriptions of animal species and the environmental regions they could be found, such as the freshwater crab Eriocher sinensis found in the Huai River running through Anhui, in waterways near the capital city, as well as reservoirs and marshes of Hebei.

=== Horology and clockworks ===
Although the Bencao Tujing was an important pharmaceutical work of the age, Su Song is perhaps better known for his work in horology. His book Xinyi Xiangfayao (新儀象法要; lit. 'Essentials of a New Method for Mechanizing the Rotation of an Armillary Sphere and a Celestial Globe') documented the intricate mechanics of his astronomical clock tower in Kaifeng. This included the use of an escapement mechanism and world's first known chain drive to power the rotating armillary sphere crowning the top as well as the 133 clock jack figurines positioned on a rotating wheel that sounded the hours by banging drums, clashing gongs, striking bells, and holding plaques with special announcements appearing from open-and-close shutter windows. While it had been Zhang Heng who applied the first motive power to the armillary sphere via hydraulics in 125 CE, it was Yi Xing (683–727) in 725 CE who first applied an escapement mechanism to a water-powered celestial globe and striking clock. The early Song dynasty horologist Zhang Sixun (fl. late 10th century) employed liquid mercury in his astronomical clock because there were complaints that water would freeze too easily in the clepsydra tanks during winter.

=== Magnetism and metallurgy ===
Shen Kuo's written work of 1088 also contains the first written description of the magnetic needle compass, the first description in China of experiments with camera obscura, the invention of movable type printing by the artisan Bi Sheng (990–1051), a method of repeated forging of cast iron under a cold blast similar to the modern Bessemer process, and the mathematical basis for spherical trigonometry that would later be mastered by the astronomer and engineer Guo Shoujing (1231–1316). While using a sighting tube of improved width to correct the position of the pole star (which had shifted over the centuries), Shen discovered the concept of true north and magnetic declination towards the North Magnetic Pole, a concept which would aid navigators in the years to come.

In addition to the method similar to the Bessemer process mentioned above, there were other notable advancements in Chinese metallurgy during the Middle Ages. During the 11th century, the growth of the iron industry caused vast deforestation due to the use of charcoal in the smelting process. To remedy the problem of deforestation, the Song Chinese discovered how to produce coke from bituminous coal as a substitute for charcoal. Although hydraulic-powered bellows for heating the blast furnace had been written of since Du Shi's (d. 38) invention of the 1st century CE, the first known drawn and printed illustration of it in operation is found in a book written in 1313 by Wang Zhen (fl. 1290–1333).

=== Mathematics ===
Qin Jiushao (c. 1202–1261) was the first to introduce the zero symbol into Chinese mathematics. Before this innovation, blank spaces were used instead of zeros in the system of counting rods. Pascal's triangle was first illustrated in China by Yang Hui in his book Xiangjie Jiuzhang Suanfa (详解九章算法), although it was described earlier around 1100 by Jia Xian. Although the Introduction to Computational Studies (算学启蒙) written by Zhu Shijie (fl. 13th century) in 1299 contained nothing new in Chinese algebra, it had a great impact on the development of Japanese mathematics.

=== Alchemy and Taoism ===
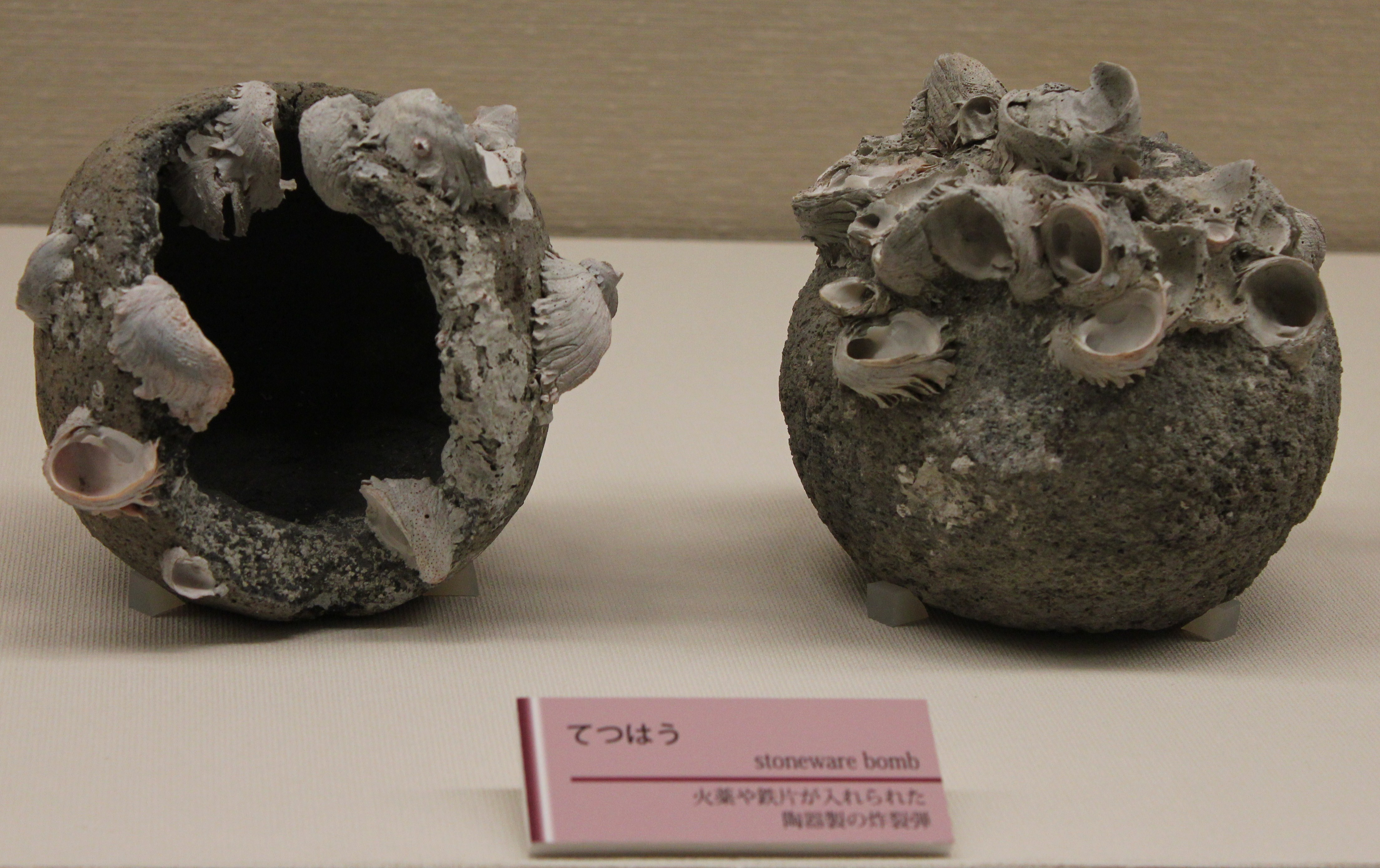
Stoneware bombs, known in Japanese as Tetsuhau (iron bomb), or in Chinese as Zhentianlei (thunder crash bomb), excavated from the Takashima shipwreck, October 2011. Excavated bombs contain a 3–6 cm (1.2–2.4 in) opening at the top where the fuse was placed. Once the fuse was lit, the bomb was thrown either by hand or catapult. According to the Mōko Shūrai Ekotoba scroll, these bombs made a large noise and emitted bright fire upon explosion. Prior to the shipwreck's discovery, observers believed the bombs depicted in the scroll were a later addition.

In their pursuit for an elixir of life and desire to create gold from various mixtures of materials, Taoists became heavily associated with alchemy. Joseph Needham labeled their pursuits as proto-scientific rather than merely pseudoscience. Fairbank and Goldman write that the futile experiments of Chinese alchemists did lead to the discovery of new metal alloys, porcelain types, and dyes. However, Nathan Sivin discounts such a close connection between Taoism and alchemy, which some sinologists have asserted, stating that alchemy was more prevalent in the secular sphere and practiced by laymen.

Experimentation with various materials and ingredients in China during the middle period led to the discovery of many ointments, creams, and other mixtures with practical uses. In a 9th-century Arab work Kitāb al-Khawāss al Kabīr, there are numerous products listed that were native to China, including waterproof and dust-repelling cream or varnish for clothes and weapons, a Chinese lacquer, varnish, or cream that protected leather items, a completely fire-proof cement for glass and porcelain, recipes for Chinese and Indian ink, a waterproof cream for the silk garments of underwater divers, and a cream specifically used for polishing mirrors.

=== Gunpowder warfare ===
The significant change that distinguished Medieval warfare to early Modern warfare was the use of gunpowder weaponry in battle. A 10th-century silken banner from Dunhuang portrays the first artistic depiction of a fire lance, a prototype of the gun. The Wujing Zongyao military manuscript of 1044 listed the first known written formulas for gunpowder, meant for light-weight bombs lobbed from catapults or thrown down from defenders behind city walls. By the 13th century, the iron-cased bomb shell, hand cannon, land mine, and rocket were developed. As evidenced by the Huolongjing of Jiao Yu and Liu Bowen, by the 14th century the Chinese had developed the heavy cannon, hollow and gunpowder-packed exploding cannonballs, the two-stage rocket with a booster rocket, the naval mine and wheellock mechanism to ignite trains of fuses.

== Jesuit activity in China ==
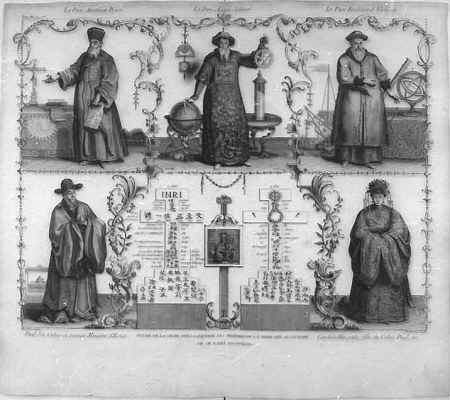
Jesuits in China

The Jesuit China missions of the 16th and 17th centuries introduced Western science and astronomy, then undergoing its own revolution, to China. One modern historian writes that in late Ming courts, the Jesuits were "regarded as impressive especially for their knowledge of astronomy, calendar-making, mathematics, hydraulics, and geography." The Society of Jesus introduced, according to Thomas Woods, "a substantial body of scientific knowledge and a vast array of mental tools for understanding the physical universe, including the Euclidean geometry that made planetary motion comprehensible." Another expert quoted by Woods said the scientific revolution brought by the Jesuits coincided with a time when science was at a very low level in China:

[The Jesuits] made efforts to translate western mathematical and astronomical works into Chinese and aroused the interest of Chinese scholars in these sciences. They made very extensive astronomical observation and carried out the first modern cartographic work in China. They also learned to appreciate the scientific achievements of this ancient culture and made them known in Europe. Through their correspondence European scientists first learned about the Chinese science and culture.

—

Johann Adam Schall published Yuan Jing Shuo, Explanation of the Telescope, in 1626, in Latin and Chinese. Schall's book referred to the telescopic observations of Galileo.

Conversely, the Jesuits were very active in transmitting Chinese knowledge to Europe. Confucius's works were translated into European languages through the agency of Jesuit scholars stationed in China. Matteo Ricci started to report on the thoughts of Confucius, and Father Prospero Intorcetta published the life and works of Confucius into Latin in 1687. It is thought that such works had considerable importance on European thinkers of the period, particularly among the Deists and other philosophical groups of the Enlightenment who were interested by the integration of the system of morality of Confucius into Christianity.

The followers of the French physiocrat François Quesnay habitually referred to him as "the Confucius of Europe", and he personally identified himself with the Chinese sage. The doctrine and even the name of "Laissez-faire" may have been inspired by the Chinese concept of Wu wei. However, the economic insights of ancient Chinese political thought had otherwise little impact outside China in later centuries. Goethe, was known as "the Confucius of Weimar".

== Scientific and technological stagnation ==
One question that has been the subject of debate among historians has been why China did not develop a Scientific Revolution and why Chinese technology fell behind that of Europe. Many hypotheses have been proposed ranging from the cultural to the political and economic. John K. Fairbank, for example, argued that the Chinese political system was hostile to scientific progress. As for Needham, he wrote that cultural factors prevented traditional Chinese achievements from developing into what could be called "science." It was the religious and philosophical framework of the Chinese intellectuals which made them unable to believe in the ideas of laws of nature:

It was not that there was no order in nature for the Chinese, but rather that it was not an order ordained by a rational personal being, and hence there was no conviction that rational personal beings would be able to spell out in their lesser earthly languages the divine code of laws which he had decreed aforetime. The Taoists, indeed, would have scorned such an idea as being too naïve for the subtlety and complexity of the universe as they intuited it.

—

Another prominent historian of science, Nathan Sivin, has argued that China did indeed experience a Scientific Revolution in the 17th century; however, it must be understood in the context of its time and culture, rather than through a Western lens as an analog of Europe's revolution.

There are also questions about the philosophy behind traditional Chinese medicine, which, derived partly from Taoist philosophy, reflects the classical Chinese belief that individual human experiences express causative principles effective in the environment at all scales. Because its theory predates use of the scientific method, it has received various criticisms based on scientific thinking. Philosopher Robert Todd Carroll, a member of The Skeptics Society, deemed acupuncture a pseudoscience because it "confuse(s) metaphysical claims with empirical claims".

In his 1997 book Guns, Germs, and Steel, Jared Diamond postulates that the lack of geographic barriers within much of China—essentially a wide plain with two large navigable rivers and a relatively smooth coastline—led to a single government without competition. At the whim of a ruler who disliked new inventions, technology could be stifled for half a century or more. In contrast, Europe's barriers of the Pyrenees, the Alps, and the various defensible peninsulas (Denmark, Scandinavia, Italy, Greece, etc.) and islands (Britain, Ireland, Sicily, etc.) led to smaller countries in constant competition with each other. If a ruler chose to ignore a scientific advancement (especially a military or economic one), his more-advanced neighbors would soon usurp his throne. This explanation, however, ignores the fact that China had been politically fragmented in the past, and was thus not inherently disposed to political unification.

Justin Yifu Lin argued for the role of the imperial examination system in removing the incentives for Chinese intellectuals to learn mathematics or to conduct experimentation. Yasheng Huang argued that the imperial examination system monopolized the most capable intellectuals in service of the state, sustained the propagation of Confucianism, and preempted the emergence of ideas that could challenge it.

== Qing era China ==
After China's defeat in the Second Opium War (1856-1860), the self-strengthening movement developed. The movement established arsenals, shipyards, and other facilities in China, and these places became places where China was exposed to foreign scientific knowledge and foreign engineering. The self-strengthening movement also contributed to the creation of state-supported enterprises to develop new economic sectors. The movement's view of science and technology was expressed through the slogan, "Chinese studies as fundamental, Western learning as useful."

An increasing number of reformers in the last two decades of the nineteenth century called for China to adopt Western technologies and to develop coal mines, railways, and telegraph.

Japan's defeat of China in the First Sino-Japanese War led to a widespread perception in China that Japan had surpassed it in science and technology.

== The Republic of China (1912–1949) ==
The Republic of China (1912–1949) saw the introduction in earnest of modern science to China. Large numbers of Chinese students studied abroad in Japan and in Europe and the US. Many returned to help teach and to found numerous schools and universities. Among them were numerous outstanding figures, including Cai Yuanpei, Hu Shih, Weng Wenhao, Ding Wenjiang, Fu Ssu-nien, and many others. As a result, there was a tremendous growth of modern science in China. As the Communist Party took over China's mainland in 1949, some of these Chinese scientists and institutions moved to Taiwan. The central science academy, Academia Sinica, also moved there.

Participants in the May Fourth Movement of 1919 advocated that science (nicknamed, "Mr. Science"), along with Democracy ("Mr. Democracy") could save China. Belief in the idea of "saving China through science" (kexue jiuguo) increased during the ROC period.

Founded in 1921, the Chinese Communist Party (CCP) reflected the May Fourth Movement's high regard for science, as many of its early leaders (including Chen Duxiu, its first general secretary) had been active in the movement. In the Yan'an era, it further embraced science as part of its drive for self-sufficiency and local industrialization to overcome economic blockade from the Nationalists. In 1939, the CCP Central Committee established a scientific research institute in Yan'an, which became the Yan'an Academy of Natural Sciences in 1940. In 1940, the Natural Science Research Society was founded in Yan'an; CCP leadership emphasized its importance, stating that "economic work and technical work are an indispensable part of revolutionary work."

== People's Republic of China ==
After the establishment of the People's Republic in 1949, China reorganized its science establishment along Soviet lines, as part of the state's broader approach to "Soviet learning" through which it sought to use the Soviet experience in science, culture, government, and economy as its model. The Soviet approach to science and technology was highly centralized, with the Academy of Sciences if the Soviet Union and several industrial ministries, and emphasized applied science (which could be more readily applied to economic production) more than basic science.

China began a formal computing development program in 1956 when it launched the Twelve-Year Science Plan and formed the Beijing Institute of Computing Technology under the Chinese Academy of Sciences (CAS). In 1958, China completed its first vacuum-tube computer. Over the next several years, Chinese researchers expanded on these efforts with extrapolation from Soviet models.

Following the Sino-Soviet split, China continued to develop domestic computing and electronic institutions, including the Beijing Institute of Electronics in 1963.

Beginning in 1964, the PRC through the Third Front construction built an industrial base in its hinterlands for strategic depth in the event of war with the Soviet Union or the United States. The Third Front construction was primarily carried out in secret, with the location for Third Front projects following the principle of "close to the mountains, dispersed, and hidden". From 1964 to 1974, China invested more than 40% of its industrial capacity in Third Front regions. After Nixon's China trip in 1972, investment to the Third Front region gradually declined. Rapprochement between the United States and China decreased the fear of invasion which motivated the Third Front construction. Through its distribution of infrastructure, industry, and human capital around the country, the Third Front created favorable conditions for subsequent market development and private enterprise.

In 1964, CAS debuted China's first self-developed large digital computer, the 119. The 119 was a core technology in facilitating China's first successful nuclear weapon test (Project 596), also in 1964.

In 1966, China transitioned from vacuum-tube computers to fully transistorized computers. In the mid-1960s through the late 1960s, China began a semiconductor program and was producing third-generation computers by 1972.

From 1975, science and technology was one of the Four Modernizations, and its high-speed development was declared essential to all national economic development by Deng Xiaoping. Other civilian technologies such as superconductivity and high-yield hybrid rice led to new developments due to the application of science to industry and foreign technology transfer.

Hua Guofeng sought to invigorate China's science and technology institutions, which the Cultural Revolution had disrupted. In March 1978, he convened a national science conference. Hua told the conference attendees that the most powerful base for modernizing science and technology in China was "the masses of the people in their hundreds of millions"; simultaneously, "we must also make vigorous efforts to expand our ranks of professional scientists and technicians ... it is necessary to raise the level of the professionals and train large numbers of scientists and technicians who are top notch by world standards."In Deng's speech to speech to the National Science Conference in March 1978, he stated:

"The key to the Four Modernizations is the modernization of science and technology. Without modern science and technology, it is impossible to build modern agriculture, modern industry, or modern national defense."

Deng Xiaoping also stated that science was a productive force and that scientists were workers. In stated in his speech at the conference that "Mental workers who serve socialism are part of the working people." "A correct understanding of these two facts is essential to the rapid development of our scientific enterprises." These statements had a significant impact in lifting the class stigma associated with intellectuals since 1949. The idea that scientists should be both "red and expert" fell out of favor.

China began to develop its national laboratories in 1983, with the first being the National Synchrotron Radiation Laboratory at China University of Science and Technology in Hefei. National laboratories were intended to be flagship facilities with the newest technology.

In 1984, China began its state key laboratory program. These laboratories were an instrument for focusing investment and raising the level of basic research in China at a time when resources were limited and distributed unevenly across the country.

In March 1986, China launched a large-scale technology development plan, the 863 Project.

In 1986, the National Natural Sciences Foundation of China was established.

In 2006, China established the Medium to Long-Term Plan for the Development of Science and Technology. Prior national science and technology plans like the 863 Program and the 973 Project had promoted basic scientific research whereas the Medium to Long-Term Plan focused on promoting seven industries deemed strategically significant.

In 2014, the China Integrated Circuit Industry Investment Fund was established in an effort to reduce dependence on foreign semiconductor companies.

In 2016, China became the country with the highest science output, as measured in publications. While the US had been the biggest producer of scientific studies until then, China published 426,000 studies in 2016 while the US published 409,000. However, the numbers are somewhat relative, as it also depends how authorship on international collaborations is counted (e.g. if one paper is counted per person or whether authorship is split among authors). In 2022, China passed both the US and the European Union in the number of high-impact papers published. As of 2024, the Nature Index ranks seven Chinese universities or institutions in the global top ten for volume of research output. The Leiden Ranking rates six in the global top ten.

== See also ==
- Chinese astronomy
- Chinese mathematics
- History of Chinese archaeology
- List of Chinese discoveries
- List of Chinese inventions
- List of inventions and discoveries of Neolithic China
- Military history of China
- History of canals in China
- History of the Chinese space program
- Science and Civilization in China
- Traditional Chinese medicine
- Two Bombs, One Satellite
- Yongle Encyclopedia
- Chinese Annals of History of Science and Technology
