= Jacqueline Ferrand =

French mathematician (1918–2014)

- Born: 17 February 1918; Alès, France
- Died: 26 April 2014 (aged 96); Sceaux, Hauts-de-Seine, France
- Other name: Jacqueline Lelong-Ferrand
- Education: École Normale Supérieure
- Spouse: Pierre Lelong (m. 1947; div. 1977)
- Scientific career
- Fields: Potential theory Representation theory

Signature
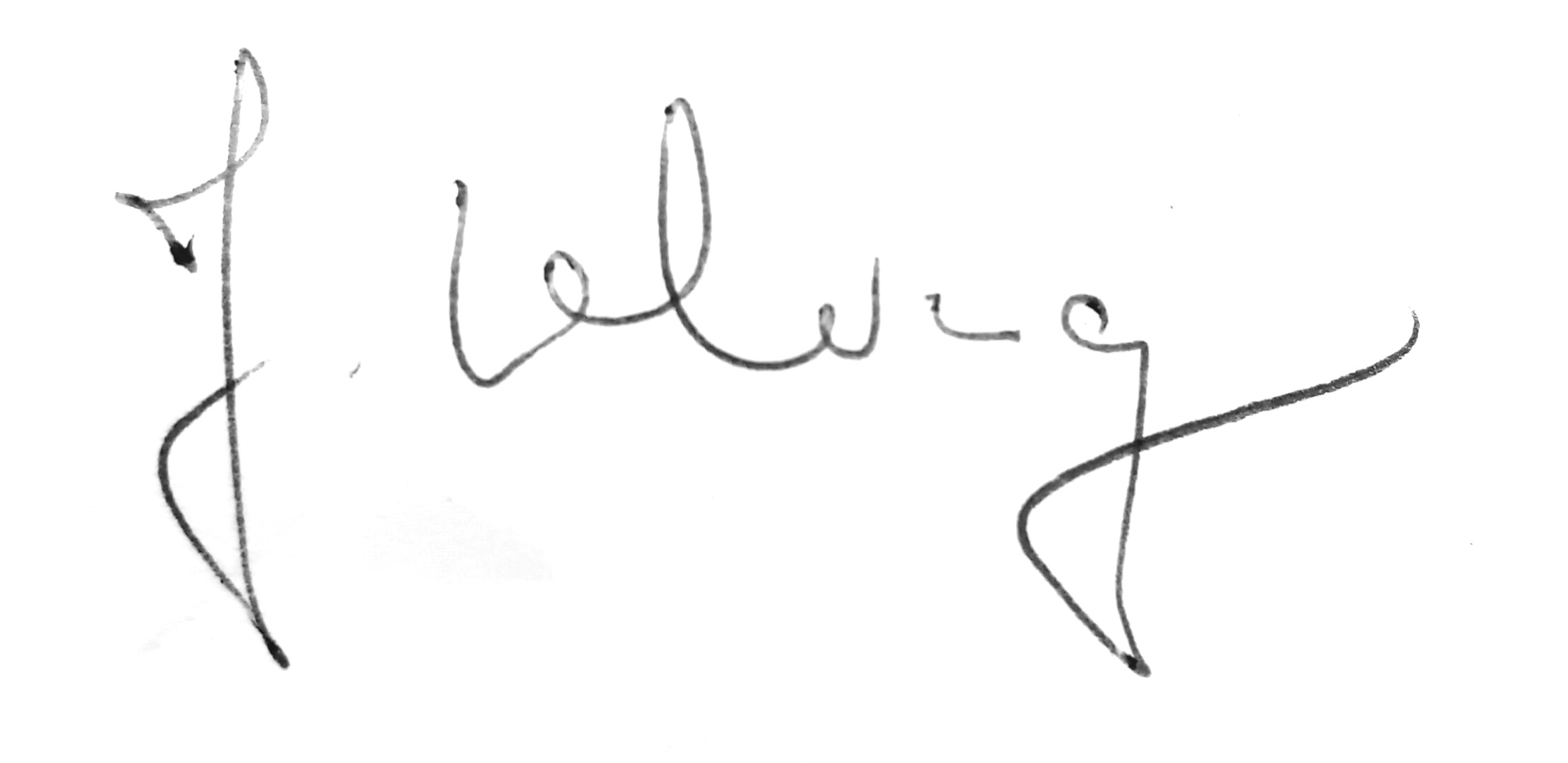

Jacqueline Ferrand (17 February 1918 – 26 April 2014) was a French mathematician who worked on conformal representation theory, potential theory, and Riemannian manifolds. She taught at universities in Caen, Lille, and Paris.

== Early life and education ==
Marie Odile Jacqueline Ferrand was born in Alès, in southern France. The daughter of a classics teacher, she attended the lycée in Nîmes. Excelling in mathematics, she won the first prize in a national mathematics competition while there.

In 1936 the École Normale Supérieure in Paris began admitting women, and she was one of the first to apply and be admitted to study mathematics and science. In 1939 she and Roger Apéry placed first in the mathematics agrégation.

== Career ==
She began teaching at the École normale supérieure de jeunes filles, an elite teacher training college for girls in Sèvres, while continuing to do mathematics research under the supervision of Arnaud Denjoy. She published three papers in 1941 and defended a doctoral thesis in 1942.

In June 1942, in connection with her doctorate (doctorat-es-sciences), she published two papers: "Étude de la correspondence entre les frontières dans la représentation conforme" and "Étude de la représentation conforme au voisinage de la frontière". As a result, in 1943 she won the Girbal-Baral Prize of the French Academy of Sciences, and obtained a faculty position at the University of Bordeaux. She moved to the University of Caen in 1945 and was given a chair at the University of Lille in 1948, which she held until 1956. After a sabbatical at Princeton University, she was then appointed a profession at the University of Paris, becoming one of the first female full professors in the science faculty. She retired in 1984.

== Contributions ==
Ferrand undertook research in the areas of analysis and geometry, especially conformal representation (from 1942), potential theory (from 1947), and from 1955 Riemann manifolds and harmonic forms.

The thesis she defended in 1942, as well as later papers, addressed conformal transformations in relation to a neighbouring boundary point. In subsequent papers, she developed a concept she called "preholomorphic functions" as the basis of a new methodology for mathematical proofs.

Researching potential theory, she was able to undertake work on theorems such as the lemmas of Julia Wolf and Phragmén-Lindelöf by generalising them to n dimensions. She went on to tackle the field's most difficult problems, once again on the basis of the new concepts she created.

From 1958 to 1968, Ferrand was less active in the research field, devoting most of her time to raising her four children. She nevertheless prepared a number of university courses. Initially simply duplicated, as a result of their popularity they were later published as books. They included a course on differential geometry, published by Masson in 1983, as well as undergraduate courses published by Armand Colin (1964) and Dunod (1967).

In 1955, she turned from research to writing, producing a comprehensive treatise titled "Représentation conforme et transformations à intégrale de Dirichlet bornée" published in the Collections de Cahiers Scientifiques.

Ferrand had nearly 100 mathematical publications, including ten books, and was active in mathematical research into her late 70s. One of her accomplishments, in 1971, was to prove the compactness of the group of conformal mappings of a non-spherical compact Riemannian manifold, resolving a conjecture of André Lichnerowicz, and on the basis of this work she became an invited speaker at the 1974 International Congress of Mathematicians in Vancouver.

While Ferrand's work has significantly influenced various areas of mathematics, her research has not been widely recognised in France. As a result of international collaboration, she has nevertheless been appreciated abroad, especially in Finland where her work has enjoyed considerable interest.

== Personal life ==
Ferrand married mathematician Pierre Lelong in 1947, taking his surname alongside hers in her subsequent publications until their separation in 1977. They had four children, born in 1949, 1951, 1952 and 1958.

Ferrand died at her home on 26 April 2014 age 96.

== Legacy ==
In 2026, Jacqueline Ferrand was announced as one of 72 historical women in STEM whose names have been proposed to be added to the 72 men already celebrated on the Eiffel Tower. The idea was conceived by a student and tour guide named Bernard Rigaud and then championed by Nathalie Drach-Temam, the President of Sorbonne University. The plan was announced by the Mayor of Paris, Anne Hidalgo following the recommendations of a committee led by Isabelle Vauglin of Femmes et Sciences and Jean-François Martins, representing the operating company which runs the Eiffel Tower.

== Links ==
- ChronoMath, une chronologie des MATHÉMATIQUES (in French); accessed 5 May 2014
