= Positive current =

In mathematics, more particularly in complex geometry, algebraic geometry and complex analysis, a positive current is a positive (n-p,n-p)-form over an n-dimensional complex manifold, taking values in distributions.

For a formal definition, consider a manifold M. Currents on M are (by definition) differential forms with coefficients in distributions; integrating over M, we may consider currents as "currents of integration", that is, functionals

$$\eta \mapsto \int_M \eta\wedge \rho$$

on smooth forms with compact support. This way, currents are considered as elements in the dual space to the space $\Lambda_c^*(M)$ of forms with compact support.

Now, let M be a complex manifold. The Hodge decomposition $\Lambda^i(M)=\bigoplus_{p+q=i}\Lambda^{p,q}(M)$ is defined on currents, in a natural way, the (p,q)-currents being functionals on $\Lambda_c^{p, q}(M)$.

A positive current is defined as a real current of Hodge type (p,p), taking non-negative values on all positive (p,p)-forms.

== Characterization of Kähler manifolds ==
Using the Hahn–Banach theorem, Harvey and Lawson proved the following criterion of existence of Kähler metrics.

Theorem: Let M be a compact complex manifold. Then M does not admit a Kähler structure if and only if M admits a non-zero positive (1,1)-current $\Theta$ which is a (1,1)-part of an exact 2-current.

Note that the de Rham differential maps 3-currents to 2-currents, hence $\Theta$ is a differential of a 3-current; if $\Theta$ is a current of integration of a complex curve, this means that this curve is a (1,1)-part of a boundary.

When M admits a surjective map $\pi:\; M \mapsto X$ to a Kähler manifold with 1-dimensional fibers, this theorem leads to the following result of complex algebraic geometry.

Corollary: In this situation, M is non-Kähler if and only if the homology class of a generic fiber of $\pi$ is a (1,1)-part of a boundary.
