= Lelong number =

In mathematics, the Lelong number is an invariant of a point of a complex analytic variety that in some sense measures the local density at that point. It was introduced by Lelong (1957). More generally a closed positive (p,p) current u on a complex manifold has a Lelong number n(u,x) for each point x of the manifold. Similarly a plurisubharmonic function also has a Lelong number at a point.

== Definitions ==
The Lelong number of a plurisubharmonic function $\phi$ at a point x of C^{n} is

$$\liminf_{z\rightarrow x}\frac{\phi(z)}{\log |z-x|}.$$

For a point x of an analytic subset A of pure dimension k, the Lelong number ν(A,x) is the limit of the ratio of the areas of A ∩ B(r,x) and a ball of radius r in C^{k} as the radius tends to zero. (Here B(r,x) is a ball of radius r centered at x.) In other words the Lelong number is a sort of measure of the local density of A near x. If x is not in the subvariety A the Lelong number is 0, and if x is a regular point the Lelong number is 1. It can be proved that the Lelong number ν(A,x) is always an integer.
