= Connectedness theorem =

In mathematics, the connectedness theorem may be one of

- Deligne's connectedness theorem
- Fulton–Hansen connectedness theorem
- Grothendieck's connectedness theorem
- Hartshorne's connectedness theorem
- Zariski's connectedness theorem, a generalization of Zariski's main theorem
