= Zariski's main theorem =

Theorem of algebraic geometry and commutative algebra

In algebraic geometry, Zariski's main theorem, proved by Oscar Zariski (1943), is a statement about the structure of birational morphisms stating roughly that there is only one branch at any normal point of a variety. It is the special case of Zariski's connectedness theorem when the two varieties are birational.

Zariski's main theorem can be stated in several ways which at first sight seem to be quite different, but are in fact deeply related. Some of the variations that have been called Zariski's main theorem are as follows:

- A birational morphism with finite fibers to a normal variety is an isomorphism to an open subset.
- The total transform of a normal fundamental point of a birational map has positive dimension. This is essentially Zariski's original version.
- The total transform of a normal point under a proper birational morphism is connected.
- A generalization due to Grothendieck describes the structure of quasi-finite morphisms of schemes.

Several results in commutative algebra imply the geometric forms of Zariski's main theorem, including:

- A normal local ring is unibranch, which is a variation of the statement that the transform of a normal point is connected.
- The local ring of a normal point of a variety is analytically normal. This is a strong form of the statement that it is unibranch.

The original result was labelled as the "MAIN THEOREM" in Zariski (1943).

== Zariski's main theorem for birational morphisms ==
Let f be a birational mapping of algebraic varieties V and W. Recall that f is defined by a closed subvariety $\Gamma \subset V \times W$ (a "graph" of f) such that the projection on the first factor $p_1$ induces an isomorphism between an open $U \subset V$ and $p_1^{-1}(U)$, and such that $p_2 \circ p_1^{-1}$ is an isomorphism on U too. The complement of U in V is called a fundamental variety or indeterminacy locus, and the image of a subset of V under $p_2 \circ p_1^{-1}$ is called a total transform of it.

The original statement of the theorem in (Zariski 1943, p. 522) reads:

MAIN THEOREM: If W is an irreducible fundamental variety on V of a birational correspondence T between V and V′ and if T has no fundamental elements on V′ then — under the assumption that V is locally normal at W — each irreducible component of the transform T[W] is of higher dimension than W.

Here T is essentially a morphism from V′ to V that is birational, W is a subvariety of the set where the inverse of T is not defined whose local ring is normal, and the transform T[W] means the inverse image of W under the morphism from V′ to V.

Here are some variants of this theorem stated using more recent terminology. Hartshorne (1977, Corollary III.11.4) calls the following connectedness statement "Zariski's Main theorem":

If f:X→Y is a birational projective morphism between noetherian integral schemes, then the inverse image of every normal point of Y is connected.

The following consequence of it (Theorem V.5.2,loc.cit.) also goes under this name:

If f:X→Y is a birational transformation of projective varieties with Y normal, then the total transform of a fundamental point of f is connected and of dimension at least 1.

=== Examples ===
- Suppose that V is a smooth variety of dimension greater than 1 and V′ is given by blowing up a point W on V. Then V is normal at W, and the component of the transform of W is a projective space, which has dimension greater than W as predicted by Zariski's original form of his main theorem.
- In the previous example the transform of W was irreducible. It is easy to find examples where the total transform is reducible by blowing up other points on the transform. For example, if V′ is given by blowing up a point W on V and then blowing up another point on this transform, the total transform of W has 2 irreducible components meeting at a point. As predicted by Hartshorne's form of the main theorem, the total transform is connected and of dimension at least 1.
- For an example where W is not normal and the conclusion of the main theorem fails, take V′ to be a smooth variety, and take V to be given by identifying two distinct points on V′, and take W to be the image of these two points. Then W is not normal, and the transform of W consists of two points, which is not connected and does not have positive dimension.

== Zariski's main theorem for quasifinite morphisms ==
In EGA III, Grothendieck calls the following statement which does not involve connectedness a "Main theorem" of Zariski Grothendieck (1961, Théorème 4.4.3):

If f:X→Y is a quasi-projective morphism of Noetherian schemes then the set of points that are isolated in their fiber is open in X. Moreover the induced scheme of this set is isomorphic to an open subset of a scheme that is finite over Y.

In EGA IV, Grothendieck observed that the last statement could be deduced from a more general theorem about the structure of quasi-finite morphisms, and the latter is often referred to as the "Zariski's main theorem in the form of Grothendieck". It is well known that open immersions and finite morphisms are quasi-finite. Grothendieck proved that under the hypothesis of separatedness all quasi-finite morphisms are compositions of such Grothendieck (1966, Théorème 8.12.6):

if Y is a quasi-compact separated scheme and $f: X \to Y$ is a separated, quasi-finite, finitely presented morphism then there is a factorization into $X \to Z \to Y$, where the first map is an open immersion and the second one is finite.

The relation between this theorem about quasi-finite morphisms and Théorème 4.4.3 of EGA III quoted above is that if f:X→Y is a projective morphism of varieties, then the set of points that are isolated in their fiber is quasifinite over Y. Then structure theorem for quasi-finite morphisms applies and yields the desired result.

== Zariski's main theorem for commutative rings ==
Zariski (1949) reformulated his main theorem in terms of commutative algebra as a statement about local rings. Grothendieck (1961, Théorème 4.4.7) generalized Zariski's formulation as follows:

If B is an algebra of finite type over a local Noetherian ring A, and n is a maximal ideal of B which is minimal among ideals of B whose inverse image in A is the maximal ideal m of A, then there is a finite A-algebra A′ with a maximal ideal m′ (whose inverse image in A is m) such that the localization B_{n} is isomorphic to the A-algebra A′_{m′}.

If in addition A and B are integral and have the same field of fractions, and A is integrally closed, then this theorem implies that A and B are equal. This is essentially Zariski's formulation of his main theorem in terms of commutative rings.

== Zariski's main theorem: topological form ==
A topological version of Zariski's main theorem says that if x is a (closed) point of a normal complex variety it is unibranch; in other words there are arbitrarily small neighborhoods U of x such that the set of non-singular points of U is connected (Mumford 1999, III.9).

The property of being normal is stronger than the property of being unibranch: for example, a cusp of a plane curve is unibranch but not normal.

== Zariski's main theorem: power series form ==
A formal power series version of Zariski's main theorem says that if x is a normal point of a variety then it is analytically normal; in other words the completion of the local ring at x is a normal integral domain (Mumford 1999, III.9).

== See also ==
- Deligne's connectedness theorem
- Fulton–Hansen connectedness theorem
- Grothendieck's connectedness theorem
- Stein factorization
- Theorem on formal functions
