= Theorem on formal functions =

In algebraic geometry, the theorem on formal functions states the following:

Let $f: X \to S$ be a proper morphism of noetherian schemes with a coherent sheaf $\mathcal{F}$ on X. Let $S_0$ be a closed subscheme of S defined by $\mathcal{I}$ and $\widehat{X}, \widehat{S}$ formal completions with respect to $X_0 = f^{-1}(S_0)$ and $S_0$. Then for each $p \ge 0$ the canonical (continuous) map:

$$(R^p f_* \mathcal{F})^\wedge \to \varprojlim_k R^p f_* \mathcal{F}_k$$

is an isomorphism of (topological) $\mathcal{O}_{\widehat{S}}$-modules, where
- The left term is $\varprojlim R^p f_* \mathcal{F} \otimes_{\mathcal{O}_S} \mathcal{O}_S/{\mathcal{I}^{k+1}}$.
- $\mathcal{F}_k = \mathcal{F} \otimes_{\mathcal{O}_S} (\mathcal{O}_S/{\mathcal{I}}^{k+1})$
- The canonical map is one obtained by passage to limit.

The theorem is used to deduce some other important theorems: Stein factorization and a version of Zariski's main theorem that says that a proper birational morphism into a normal variety is an isomorphism. Some other corollaries (with the notations as above) are:

Corollary: For any $s \in S$, topologically,

$$((R^p f_* \mathcal{F})_s)^\wedge \simeq \varprojlim H^p(f^{-1}(s), \mathcal{F}\otimes_{\mathcal{O}_S} (\mathcal{O}_s/\mathfrak{m}_s^k))$$

where the completion on the left is with respect to $\mathfrak{m}_s$.

Corollary: Let r be such that $\operatorname{dim} f^{-1}(s) \le r$ for all $s \in S$. Then

$$R^i f_* \mathcal{F} = 0, \quad i > r.$$

Corollay: For each $s \in S$, there exists an open neighborhood U of s such that

$$R^i f_* \mathcal{F}|_U = 0, \quad i > \operatorname{dim} f^{-1}(s).$$

Corollary: If $f_* \mathcal{O}_X = \mathcal{O}_S$, then $f^{-1}(s)$ is connected for all $s \in S$.

The theorem also leads to the Grothendieck existence theorem, which gives an equivalence between the category of coherent sheaves on a scheme and the category of coherent sheaves on its formal completion (in particular, it yields algebralizability.)

Finally, it is possible to weaken the hypothesis in the theorem; cf. Illusie. According to Illusie (pg. 204), the proof given in EGA III is due to Serre. The original proof (due to Grothendieck) was never published.

== The construction of the canonical map ==
Let the setting be as in the lede. In the proof one uses the following alternative definition of the canonical map.

Let $i': \widehat{X} \to X, i: \widehat{S} \to S$ be the canonical maps. Then we have the base change map of $\mathcal{O}_{\widehat{S}}$-modules

$$i^* R^q f_* \mathcal{F} \to R^p \widehat{f}_* (i'^* \mathcal{F})$$.

where $\widehat{f}: \widehat{X} \to \widehat{S}$ is induced by $f: X \to S$. Since $\mathcal{F}$ is coherent, we can identify $i'^*\mathcal{F}$ with $\widehat{\mathcal{F}}$. Since $R^q f_* \mathcal{F}$ is also coherent (as f is proper), doing the same identification, the above reads:

$$(R^q f_* \mathcal{F})^\wedge \to R^p \widehat{f}_* \widehat{\mathcal{F}}$$.

Using $f: X_n \to S_n$ where $X_n = (X_0, \mathcal{O}_X/\mathcal{J}^{n+1})$ and $S_n = (S_0, \mathcal{O}_S/\mathcal{I}^{n+1})$, one also obtains (after passing to limit):

$$R^q \widehat{f}_* \widehat{\mathcal{F}} \to \varprojlim R^p f_* \mathcal{F}_n$$

where $\mathcal{F}_n$ are as before. One can verify that the composition of the two maps is the same map in the lede. (cf. EGA III-1, section 4)
