= Remmert–Stein theorem =

In complex analysis, a field in mathematics, the Remmert–Stein theorem, introduced by Reinhold Remmert and Karl Stein (1953), gives conditions for the closure of an analytic set to be analytic.

The theorem states that if F is an analytic set of dimension less than k in some complex manifold D, and M is an analytic subset of D – F with all components of dimension at least k, then the closure of M is either analytic or contains F.

The condition on the dimensions is necessary: for example, the set of points (1/n,0) in the complex plane is analytic in the complex plane minus the origin, but its closure in the complex plane is not.

== Relations to other theorems ==
A consequence of the Remmert–Stein theorem (also treated in their paper), is Chow's theorem stating that any projective complex analytic space is necessarily a projective algebraic variety.

The Remmert–Stein theorem is implied by a proper mapping theorem due to Bishop (1964), see Aguilar & Verjovsky (2021).
