= Unibranch local ring =

In algebraic geometry, a local ring A is said to be unibranch if the reduced ring A_{red} (obtained by quotienting A by its nilradical) is an integral domain, and the integral closure B of A_{red} is also a local ring. A unibranch local ring is said to be geometrically unibranch if the residue field of B is a purely inseparable extension of the residue field of A_{red}. A complex variety X is called topologically unibranch at a point x if for all complements Y of closed algebraic subsets of X there is a fundamental system of neighborhoods (in the classical topology) of x whose intersection with Y is connected.

In particular, a normal ring is unibranch. One result on unibranch points in algebraic geometry is the following:

Theorem Let X and Y be two integral locally noetherian schemes and $f \colon X \to Y$ a proper dominant morphism. Denote their function fields by K(X) and K(Y), respectively. Suppose that the algebraic closure of K(Y) in K(X) has separable degree n and that $y \in Y$ is unibranch. Then the fiber $f^{-1}(y)$ has at most n connected components. In particular, if f is birational, then the fibers of unibranch points are connected.

In EGA, the theorem is obtained as a corollary of Zariski's main theorem.
