= Generic flatness =

In algebraic geometry and commutative algebra, the theorems of generic flatness and generic freeness state that under certain hypotheses, a sheaf of modules on a scheme is flat or free. They are due to Alexander Grothendieck.

Generic flatness states that if Y is an integral locally noetherian scheme, u : X → Y is a finite type morphism of schemes, and F is a coherent O_{X}-module, then there is a non-empty open subset U of Y such that the restriction of F to u^{−1}(U) is flat over U.

Because Y is integral, U is a dense open subset of Y. This can be applied to deduce a variant of generic flatness which is true when the base is not integral. Suppose that S is a noetherian scheme, u : X → S is a finite type morphism, and F is a coherent O_{X}-module. Then there exists a partition of S into locally closed subsets S_{1}, ..., S_{n} with the following property: Give each S_{i} its reduced scheme structure, denote by X_{i} the fiber product X ×_{S} S_{i}, and denote by F_{i} the restriction F ⊗_{O_{S}} O_{S_{i}}; then each F_{i} is flat.

== Generic freeness ==
Generic flatness is a consequence of the generic freeness lemma. Generic freeness states that if A is a noetherian integral domain, B is a finite type A-algebra, and M is a finite type B-module, then there exists a non-zero element f of A such that M_{f} is a free A_{f}-module. Generic freeness can be extended to the graded situation: If B is graded by the natural numbers, A acts in degree zero, and M is a graded B-module, then f may be chosen such that each graded component of M_{f} is free.

Generic freeness is proved using Grothendieck's technique of dévissage. Another version of generic freeness can be proved using Noether's normalization lemma.

== Bibliography ==
- Eisenbud, David (1995), Commutative algebra with a view toward algebraic geometry, Graduate Texts in Mathematics, vol. 150, Berlin, New York: Springer-Verlag, ISBN 978-0-387-94268-1, MR 1322960
- Grothendieck, Alexandre; Dieudonné, Jean (1965). "Éléments de géométrie algébrique: IV. Étude locale des schémas et des morphismes de schémas, Seconde partie". Publications Mathématiques de l'IHÉS. 24. doi:10.1007/bf02684322. MR 0199181.
