= Stein factorization =

In algebraic geometry, the Stein factorization, introduced by Karl Stein (1956) for the case of complex spaces, states that a proper morphism of schemes can be factorized as a composition of a finite mapping and a proper morphism with connected fibers. Roughly speaking, Stein factorization contracts the connected components of the fibers of a mapping to points.

== Statement ==
One version for schemes states the following: (EGA, III.4.3.1)

Let X be a scheme, S a locally noetherian scheme and $f: X \to S$ a proper morphism. Then one can write

$$f = g \circ f'$$

where $g\colon S' \to S$ is a finite morphism and $f'\colon X \to S'$ is a proper morphism so that $f'_* \mathcal{O}_X = \mathcal{O}_{S'}.$

The existence of this decomposition itself is not difficult. See below. But, by Zariski's connectedness theorem, the last part in the above says that the fiber $f'^{-1}(s)$ is connected for any $s \in S'$. It follows:

Corollary: For any $s \in S$, the set of connected components of the fiber $f^{-1}(s)$ is in bijection with the set of points in the fiber $g^{-1}(s)$.

== Proof ==
Set:

$$S' = \operatorname{Spec}_S f_* \mathcal{O}_X$$

where Spec_{S} is the relative Spec. The construction gives the natural map $g\colon S' \to S$, which is finite since $\mathcal{O}_X$ is coherent and f is proper. The morphism f factors through g and one gets $f'\colon X \to S'$, which is proper. By construction, $f'_* \mathcal{O}_X = \mathcal{O}_{S'}$. One then uses the theorem on formal functions to show that the last equality implies $f'$ has connected fibers. (This part is sometimes referred to as Zariski's connectedness theorem.)

== See also ==
- Contraction morphism
