= Hans Hefer =

German mathematician

Hans Hefer (born on 27 February 1907 and died on 22 November 1941, Eastern Front) was a German mathematician who worked on several complex variables. Hefer's lemma or Hefer's theorem bear his name.

== Life ==
There is not sufficient documentation regarding the life of Hans Hefer. Hefer is known to have earned a Ph.D. at the University of Münster in 1941, supervised by Heinrich Behnke.

In a posthumous publication made by Karl Stein and Heinrich Benke with Hefer's name in Mathematische Annalen in 1950/51, it was written in a footnote that the author had fallen in the East and the article is an excerpt from his dissertation which he defended in 1940. It was also added there that Since 1941, papers by K. Oka and H. Cartan have appeared that contain Hefer's results but use different proofs.
