= Proper morphism =

Term in algebraic geometry

In algebraic geometry, a proper morphism between schemes is an analog of a proper map between complex analytic spaces.

Some authors call a proper variety over a field $k$ a complete variety. For example, every projective variety over a field $k$ is proper over $k$. A scheme $X$ of finite type over the complex numbers (for example, a variety) is proper over $\mathbb{C}$ if and only if the space $X(\mathbb{C})$ of complex points with the classical (Euclidean) topology is compact.

A closed immersion is proper. A morphism is finite if and only if it is proper and quasi-finite.

== Definition ==
A morphism $f:X\to Y$ of schemes is called universally closed if for every scheme $Z$ with a morphism $Z\to Y$, the projection from the fiber product

$$X \times_Y Z \to Z$$

is a closed map of the underlying topological spaces. A morphism of schemes is called proper if it is separated, of finite type, and universally closed ([EGA] II, 5.4.1 ). One also says that $X$ is proper over $Y$. In particular, a variety $X$ over a field $k$ is said to be proper over $k$ if the morphism $X\to\operatorname{Spec}(k)$ is proper.

== Examples ==
For any natural number $n$, projective space $\mathbb{P}^n$ over a commutative ring $R$ is proper over $R$. Projective morphisms are proper, but not all proper morphisms are projective. For example, there is a smooth proper complex variety of dimension 3 which is not projective over $\mathbb{C}$. Affine varieties of positive dimension over a field $k$ are never proper over $k$. More generally, a proper affine morphism of schemes must be finite. For example, it is not hard to see that the affine line $\mathbb{A}^1$ over a field $k$ is not proper over $k$, because the morphism $\mathbb{A}^1\to\text{Spec}(K)$ is not universally closed. Indeed, the pulled-back morphism

$$\mathbb{A}^1 \times_k \mathbb{A}^1 \to \mathbb{A}^1$$

(given by $(x,y)\mapsto y$) is not closed, because the image of the closed subset $xy=1$ in $\mathbb{A}^1\times\mathbb{A}^1=\mathbb{A}^2$ is $\mathbb{A}^1-0$, which is not closed in $\mathbb{A}^1$.

== Properties and characterizations of proper morphisms ==
In the following, let $f:X\to Y$ be a morphism of schemes.

- The composition of two proper morphisms is proper.
- Any base change of a proper morphism $f:X\to Y$ is proper. That is, if $g:Z\to Y$ is any morphism of schemes, then the resulting morphism $X\times_Y Z\to Z$ is proper.
- Properness is a local property on the base (in the Zariski topology). That is, if $Y$ is covered by some open subschemes $Y_j$ and the restriction of $f$ to all $f^{-1}(Y_j)$ is proper, then so is $f$.
- More strongly, properness is local on the base in the fpqc topology. For example, if $X$ is a scheme over a field $k$ and $E$ is a field extension of $k$, then $X$ is proper over $k$ if and only if the base change $X_E$ is proper over $E$.
- Closed immersions are proper.
- More generally, finite morphisms are proper. This is a consequence of the going up theorem.
- By Deligne, a morphism of schemes is finite if and only if it is proper and quasi-finite. This had been shown by Grothendieck if the morphism $f:X\to Y$ is locally of finite presentation, which follows from the other assumptions if $Y$ is noetherian.
- For $X$ proper over a scheme $S$, and $Y$ separated over $S$, the image of any morphism $X\to Y$ over $S$ is a closed subset of $Y$. This is analogous to the theorem in topology that the image of a continuous map from a compact space to a Hausdorff space is a closed subset.
- The Stein factorization theorem states that any proper morphism to a locally noetherian scheme can be factored as $X\to Z\to Y$, where $X\to Z$ is proper, surjective, and has geometrically connected fibers, and $Z\to Y$ is finite.
- Chow's lemma says that proper morphisms are closely related to projective morphisms. One version is: if $X$ is proper over a quasi-compact scheme $Y$ and $X$ has only finitely many irreducible components (which is automatic for $Y$ noetherian), then there is a projective surjective morphism $g:W\to X$ such that $W$ is projective over $Y$. Moreover, one can arrange that $g$ is an isomorphism over a dense open subset $U$ of $X$, and that $g^{-1}(U)$ is dense in $W$. One can also arrange that $W$ is integral if $X$ is integral.
- Nagata's compactification theorem, as generalized by Deligne, says that a separated morphism of finite type between quasi-compact and quasi-separated schemes factors as an open immersion followed by a proper morphism.
- Proper morphisms between locally noetherian schemes preserve coherent sheaves, in the sense that the higher direct images $R^if_{*}F$ (in particular the direct image $f_*F$) of a coherent sheaf $F$ are coherent (EGA III, 3.2.1). (Analogously, for a proper map between complex analytic spaces, Grauert and Remmert showed that the higher direct images preserve coherent analytic sheaves.) As a very special case: the ring of regular functions on a proper scheme $X$ over a field $k$ has finite dimension as a $k$-vector space. By contrast, the ring of regular functions on the affine line over $k$ is the polynomial ring $k[x]$, which does not have finite dimension as a $k$-vector space.
- There is also a slightly stronger statement of this:(EGA III, 3.2.4) let $f\colon X \to S$ be a morphism of finite type, $S$ locally noetherian and $F$ a $\mathcal{O}_X$-module. If the support of $F$ is proper over $S$, then for each $i \ge 0$ the higher direct image $R^i f_* F$ is coherent.
- For a scheme $X$ of finite type over the complex numbers, the set $X(\mathbb{C})$ of complex points is a complex analytic space, using the classical (Euclidean) topology. For $X$ and $Y$ separated and of finite type over $\mathbb{C}$, a morphism $f:X\to Y$ over $\mathbb{C}$ is proper if and only if the continuous map $f:X(\mathbb{C})\to Y(\mathbb{C})$ is proper in the sense that the inverse image of every compact set is compact.
- If $f:X\to Y$ and $g:Y\to Z$ are such that $gf$ is proper and $g$ is separated, then $f$ is proper. This can for example be easily proven using the following criterion.

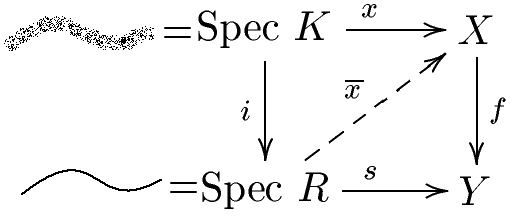
Valuative criterion of properness

== Valuative criterion of properness ==
There is a very intuitive criterion for properness which goes back to Chevalley. It is commonly called the valuative criterion of properness. Let $f:X\to Y$ be a morphism of finite type of Noetherian schemes. Then $f$ is proper if and only if for all discrete valuation rings $R$ with fraction field $K$ and for any $K$-valued point $x\in X(K)$ that maps to a point $f(x)$ that is defined over $R$, there is a unique lift of $x$ to $\overline{x} \in X(R)$. (EGA II, 7.3.8). More generally, a quasi-separated morphism $f:X\to Y$ of finite type (note: finite type includes quasi-compact) of 'any' schemes $X$, $Y$ is proper if and only if for all valuation rings $R$ with fraction field $K$ and for any $K$-valued point $x\in X(K)$ that maps to a point $f(x)$ that is defined over $R$, there is a unique lift of $x$ to $\overline{x} \in X(R)$. (Stacks project Tags 01KF and 01KY). Noting that $\text{Spec}(K)$ is the generic point of $\text{Spec}(R)$ and discrete valuation rings are precisely the regular local one-dimensional rings, one may rephrase the criterion: given a regular curve on $Y$ (corresponding to the morphism $s:\text{Spec}(R)\to Y$) and given a lift of the generic point of this curve to $X$, $f$ is proper if and only if there is exactly one way to complete the curve.

Similarly, $f$ is separated if and only if in every such diagram, there is at most one lift $\overline{x} \in X(R)$.

For example, given the valuative criterion, it becomes easy to check that projective space $\mathbb{P}^n$ is proper over a field (or even over $\mathbb{Z}$). One simply observes that for a discrete valuation ring $R$ with fraction field $K$, every $K$-point $[x_0,\ldots,x_n]$ of projective space comes from an $R$-point, by scaling the coordinates so that all lie in $R$ and at least one is a unit in $R$.

=== Geometric interpretation with disks ===
One of the motivating examples for the valuative criterion of properness is the interpretation of $\text{Spec}(\mathbb{C}[[t]])$ as an infinitesimal disk, or complex-analytically, as the disk $\Delta = \{x \in \mathbb{C} : |x| < 1 \}$. This comes from the fact that every power series

$f(t) = \sum_{n=0}^\infty a_nt^n$

converges in some disk of radius $r$ around the origin. Then, using a change of coordinates, this can be expressed as a power series on the unit disk. Then, if we invert $t$, this is the ring $\mathbb{C}[[t]][t^{-1}] = \mathbb{C}((t))$ which are the power series which may have a pole at the origin. This is represented topologically as the open disk $\Delta^* = \{x \in \mathbb{C} : 0<|x| < 1 \}$ with the origin removed. For a morphism of schemes over $\text{Spec}(\mathbb{C})$, this is given by the commutative diagram

$$\begin{matrix}
\Delta^* & \to &  X \\
\downarrow & & \downarrow \\
\Delta & \to & Y
\end{matrix}$$

Then, the valuative criterion for properness would be a filling in of the point $0 \in \Delta$ in the image of $\Delta^*$.

==== Example ====
It's instructive to look at a counter-example to see why the valuative criterion of properness should hold on spaces analogous to closed compact manifolds. If we take $X = \mathbb{P}^1 - \{x \}$ and $Y = \text{Spec}(\mathbb{C})$, then a morphism $\text{Spec}(\mathbb{C}((t))) \to X$ factors through an affine chart of $X$, reducing the diagram to

$$\begin{matrix}
\text{Spec}(\mathbb{C}((t))) & \to &  \text{Spec}(\mathbb{C}[t,t^{-1}]) \\
\downarrow & & \downarrow \\
\text{Spec}(\mathbb{C}[[t]]) & \to & \text{Spec}(\mathbb{C})
\end{matrix}$$

where $\text{Spec}(\mathbb{C}[t,t^{-1}]) = \mathbb{A}^1 - \{0\}$ is the chart centered around $\{x \}$ on $X$. This gives the commutative diagram of commutative algebras

$$\begin{matrix}
\mathbb{C}((t)) & \leftarrow & \mathbb{C}[t,t^{-1}] \\
\uparrow & & \uparrow \\
\mathbb{C}[[t]] & \leftarrow & \mathbb{C}
\end{matrix}$$

Then, a lifting of the diagram of schemes, $\text{Spec}(\mathbb{C}[[t]]) \to \text{Spec}(\mathbb{C}[t,t^{-1}])$, would imply there is a morphism $\mathbb{C}[t,t^{-1}] \to \mathbb{C}[[t]]$ sending $t \mapsto t$ from the commutative diagram of algebras. This, of course, cannot happen. Therefore $X$ is not proper over $Y$.

=== Geometric interpretation with curves ===
There is another similar example of the valuative criterion of properness which captures some of the intuition for why this theorem should hold. Consider a curve $C$ and the complement of a point $C-\{p\}$. Then the valuative criterion for properness would read as a diagram

$$\begin{matrix}
C-\{p\} & \rightarrow & X \\
\downarrow & & \downarrow \\
C & \rightarrow & Y
\end{matrix}$$

with a lifting of $C \to X$. Geometrically this means every curve in the scheme $X$ can be completed to a compact curve. This bit of intuition aligns with what the scheme-theoretic interpretation of a morphism of topological spaces with compact fibers, that a sequence in one of the fibers must converge. Because this geometric situation is a problem locally, the diagram is replaced by looking at the local ring $\mathcal{O}_{C,\mathfrak{p}}$, which is a DVR, and its fraction field $\text{Frac}(\mathcal{O}_{C,\mathfrak{p}})$. Then, the lifting problem then gives the commutative diagram

$$\begin{matrix}
\text{Spec}(\text{Frac}(\mathcal{O}_{C,\mathfrak{p}})
) & \rightarrow & X \\
\downarrow & & \downarrow \\
\text{Spec}(\mathcal{O}_{C,\mathfrak{p}}
) & \rightarrow & Y
\end{matrix}$$

where the scheme $\text{Spec}(\text{Frac}(\mathcal{O}_{C,\mathfrak{p}}))$ represents a local disk around $\mathfrak{p}$ with the closed point $\mathfrak{p}$ removed.

== Proper morphism of formal schemes ==
Let $f\colon \mathfrak{X} \to \mathfrak{S}$ be a morphism between locally noetherian formal schemes. We say $f$ is proper or $\mathfrak{X}$ is proper over $\mathfrak{S}$ if (i) $f$ is an adic morphism (i.e., maps the ideal of definition to the ideal of definition) and (ii) the induced map $f_0\colon X_0 \to S_0$ is proper, where $X_0 = (\mathfrak{X}, \mathcal{O}_\mathfrak{X}/I), S_0 = (\mathfrak{S}, \mathcal{O}_\mathfrak{S}/K), I = f^*(K) \mathcal{O}_\mathfrak{X}$ and $K$ is the ideal of definition of $\mathfrak{S}$.(EGA III, 3.4.1) The definition is independent of the choice of $K$.

For example, if $g:Y\to Z$ is a proper morphism of locally noetherian schemes, $Z_0$ is a closed subset of $Z$, and $Y_0$ is a closed subset of $Y$ such that $g(Y_0)\subset Z_0$, then the morphism $\widehat{g}\colon Y_{/Y_0} \to Z_{/Z_0}$ on formal completions is a proper morphism of formal schemes.

Grothendieck proved the coherence theorem in this setting. Namely, let $f\colon \mathfrak{X} \to \mathfrak{S}$ be a proper morphism of locally noetherian formal schemes. If $F$ is a coherent sheaf on $\mathfrak{X}$, then the higher direct images $R^i f_* F$ are coherent.

== See also ==
- Proper base change theorem
- Stein factorization
- Tube lemma
