= E. Brian Davies =

British mathematician (1944–2025)

Brian Davies
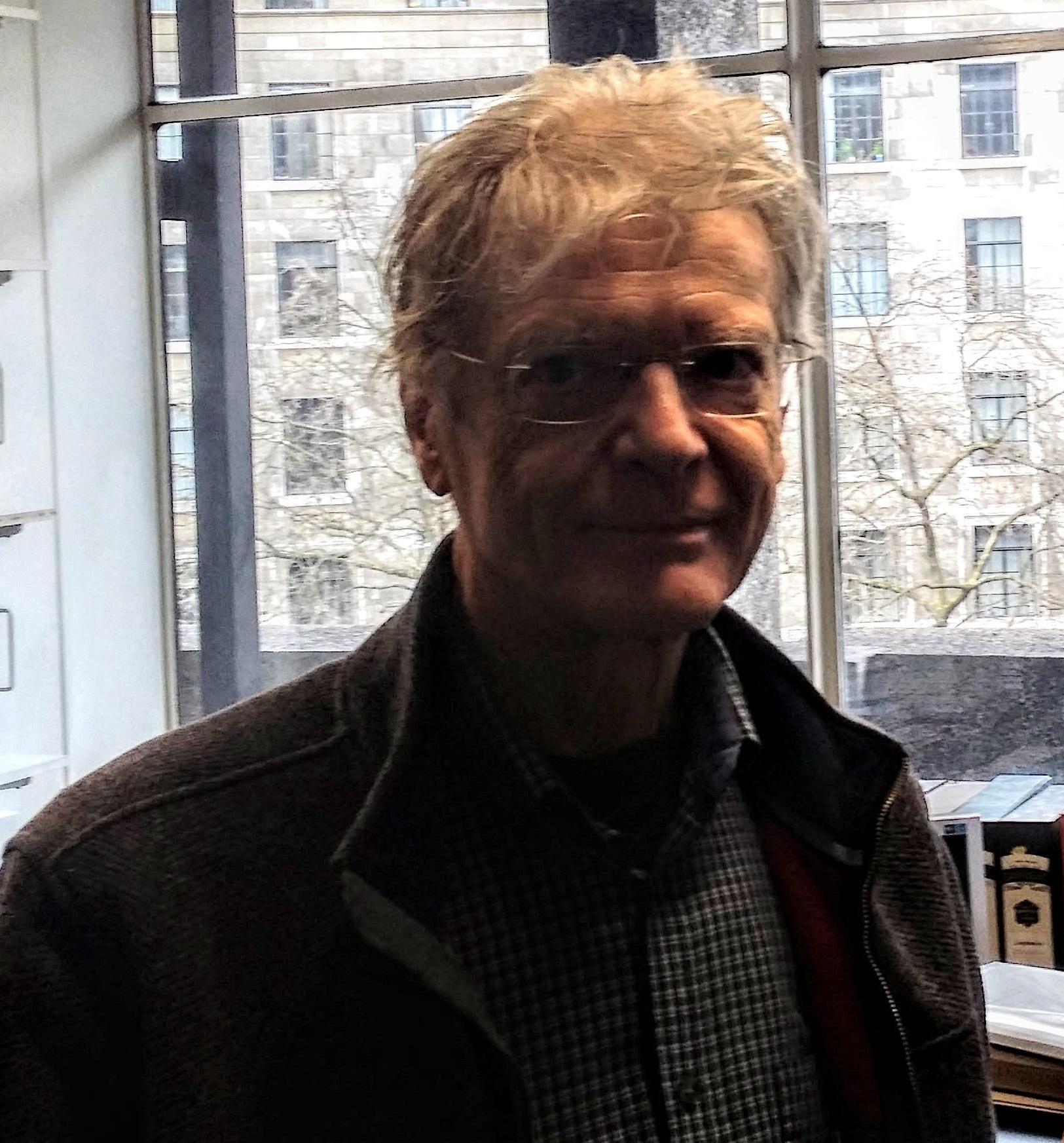
- Davies in 2016
- Born: Edward Brian Davies; 13 June 1944
- Died: 2 June 2025 (aged 80)
- Education: St John's College, Oxford (Ph.D., 1965)
- Awards: Senior Berwick Prize (1998); Pólya Prize (2011)
- Scientific career
- Workplaces: University of Oxford; King's College London
- Doctoral advisor: David Edwards
- Doctoral students: David E. Evans

Edward Brian Davies FRS (13 June 1944 – 2 June 2025) was a British mathematician who was professor of Mathematics, King's College London (1981–2010), and was the author of the popular science book Science in the Looking Glass: What do Scientists Really Know. In 2010, he was awarded a Gauss Lecture by the German Mathematical Society.

Davies died on 2 June 2025, at the age of 80.

== Publications ==
=== Books ===
- Davies, E. Brian (1976). Quantum Theory of Open Systems. Academic Press. ISBN 0-12-206150-0.
- Davies, E.B. (1980). One-Parameter Semigroups. London Math. Soc. Monograph series. Academic Press. ISBN 0-12-206280-9.
- Davies, E.B. (1989). Heat Kernels and Spectral Theory. Cambridge Tracts in Mathematics. Vol. 92. Cambridge University Press. ISBN 0-521-36136-2.
- Davies, E.B. (1995). Spectral Theory and Differential Operators. Cambridge Studies in Advanced Mathematics. Vol. 42. Cambridge University Press. ISBN 0-521-47250-4.
- Davies, E.B.; Safarov, Y. (1999). Spectral Theory and Geometry. London Math. Soc. Lecture Note Series. Vol. 273. Cambridge University Press. ISBN 0-521-77749-6.
- Davies, E.B. (2003). Science in the Looking Glass. Oxford University Press. ISBN 0-19-852543-5.
- Davies, E.B. (2007). Linear Operators and their Spectra. Cambridge Studies in Advanced Mathematics. Vol. 106. Cambridge University Press. ISBN 978-0-521-86629-3.
- Davies, E.B. (2010). Why Beliefs Matter: Reflections on the Nature of Science. Oxford University Press. ISBN 978-0-19-958620-2.
