= Analytic manifold =

In mathematics, an analytic manifold, also known as a $C^\omega$ manifold, is a differentiable manifold with analytic transition maps. The term usually refers to real analytic manifolds, although complex manifolds are also analytic. In algebraic geometry, analytic spaces are a generalization of analytic manifolds such that singularities are permitted.

For $U \subseteq \R^n$, the space of analytic functions, $C^{\omega}(U)$, consists of infinitely differentiable functions $f:U \to \R$, such that the Taylor series

$$T_f(\mathbf{x}) = \sum_{|\alpha| \geq 0}\frac{D^\alpha f(\mathbf{x_0})}{\alpha!} (\mathbf{x}-\mathbf{x_0})^\alpha$$

converges to $f(\mathbf{x})$ in a neighborhood of $\mathbf{x_0}$, for all $\mathbf{x_0} \in U$. The requirement that the transition maps be analytic is significantly more restrictive than that they be infinitely differentiable; the analytic manifolds are a proper subset of the smooth, i.e. $C^\infty$, manifolds. There are many similarities between the theory of analytic and smooth manifolds, but a critical difference is that analytic manifolds do not admit analytic partitions of unity, whereas smooth partitions of unity are an essential tool in the study of smooth manifolds. A fuller description of the definitions and general theory can be found at differentiable manifolds, for the real case, and at complex manifolds, for the complex case.

== See also ==
- Complex manifold
- Analytic variety
- Algebraic geometry § Analytic geometry
