= Karl Stein =

Karl Stein may refer to:

- Karl Stein (politician)
- Karl Stein (mathematician), eponym of Stein manifold
