= Hefer's theorem =

In several complex variables, Hefer's theorem is a result that represents the difference at two points of a holomorphic function as the sum of the products of the coordinate differences of these two points with other holomorphic functions defined in the Cartesian product of the function's domain.

The theorem bears the name of Hans Hefer. The result was published by Karl Stein and Heinrich Behnke under the name Hans Hefer. In a footnote in the same article, it is written that Hans Hefer died on the eastern front and that the work was an excerpt from Hefer's dissertation which he defended in 1940.

== Statement of the theorem ==
Let $\Omega\subset \Complex^n$ be a domain of holomorphy and $f:\Omega\mapsto \Complex$ be a holomorphic function. Then, there exist holomorphic functions $g_1, \cdots, g_n$ defined on $\Omega \times \Omega$ so that

$$f(z)-f(w)=\sum_{j=1}^n (z_j-w_j)g_j(w,z)$$

holds for every $z, w\in \Omega$.

The decomposition in the theorem is feasible also on many non-pseudoconvex domains.

== Hefer's lemma ==
The proof of the theorem follows from Hefer's lemma.

Let $\Omega\subset \Complex^n$ be a domain of holomorphy and $f:\Omega\mapsto \Complex$ be a holomorphic function. Suppose that $f$ is identically zero on the intersection of $\Omega$ with the $(N-k)$-dimensional complex coordinate space; i.e.

$$f(0,\cdots, 0, z_{k+1}, z_k, \cdots, z_n)\equiv 0$$.

Then, there exist holomorphic functions $g_1, \cdots, g_n$ defined on $\Omega$ so that

$$f(z)=\sum_{j=1}^n z_jg_j(z)$$

holds for every $z\in \Omega$.
