= Michael Struwe =

German mathematician (born 1955)

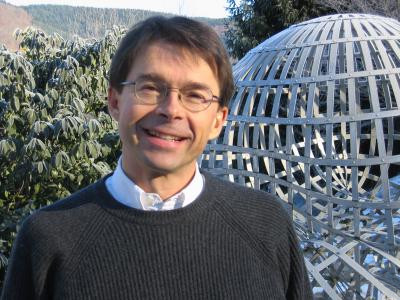
- Struwe in Oberwolfach, 2006
- Born: 6 October 1955 (age 70); Wuppertal, Germany
- Education: University of Bonn
- Occupation: Mathematician

Michael Struwe (born 6 October 1955 in Wuppertal) is a German mathematician who specializes in calculus of variations and nonlinear partial differential equations. He won the 2012 Cantor medal from the Deutsche Mathematiker-Vereinigung for "outstanding achievements in the field of geometric analysis, calculus of variations and nonlinear partial differential equations".

He studied mathematics at the University of Bonn, gaining his PhD in 1980 with the title Infinitely Many Solutions for Superlinear, Anticoercive Elliptic Boundary Value Problems without Oddness. He took research positions in Paris and at ETH Zürich before gaining his habilitation in Bonn in 1984. Since 1986, he has been working at ETH Zürich, initially as an assistant professor, becoming a full professor in 1993. His specialisms included nonlinear partial differential equations and calculus of variations.

He is joint editor of the journals Calculus of Variations, Commentarii Mathematici Helvetici, International Mathematical Research Notices and Mathematische Zeitschrift.

His publications include the book Variational methods (Applications to nonlinear PDE and Hamiltonian systems) (Springer-Verlag, 1990), which was praised by Jürgen Jost as "very useful" with an "impressive range of often difficult examples".

Struwe was awarded a Gauss Lecture by the German Mathematical Society in 2011. In 2012, Struwe was selected as one of the inaugural fellows of the American Mathematical Society.

== Major publications ==
- Giaquinta, Mariano; Struwe, Michael (1982). "On the partial regularity of weak solutions of nonlinear parabolic systems". Mathematische Zeitschrift. 179 (4). Springer Science and Business Media LLC: 437–451. doi:10.1007/bf01215058. ISSN 0025-5874. S2CID 121187999.
- Struwe, Michael (1984). "A global compactness result for elliptic boundary value problems involving limiting nonlinearities". Mathematische Zeitschrift. 187 (4). Springer Science and Business Media LLC: 511–517. doi:10.1007/bf01174186. ISSN 0025-5874. S2CID 120970687.
- Struwe, Michael (1985). "On the evolution of harmonic mappings of Riemannian surfaces". Commentarii Mathematici Helvetici. 60 (1). European Mathematical Society - EMS - Publishing House GmbH: 558–581. doi:10.1007/bf02567432. ISSN 0010-2571. S2CID 122295509.
- Cerami, G; Solimini, S; Struwe, M (1986). "Some existence results for superlinear elliptic boundary value problems involving critical exponents". Journal of Functional Analysis. 69 (3). Elsevier BV: 289–306. doi:10.1016/0022-1236(86)90094-7. ISSN 0022-1236.
- Struwe, Michael (1988). "On partial regularity results for the navier-stokes equations". Communications on Pure and Applied Mathematics. 41 (4). Wiley: 437–458. doi:10.1002/cpa.3160410404. ISSN 0010-3640.
- Struwe, Michael (1988). "The existence of surfaces of constant mean curvature with free boundaries". Acta Mathematica. 160. International Press of Boston: 19–64. doi:10.1007/bf02392272. ISSN 0001-5962. S2CID 121385750.
- Struwe, Michael. On the evolution of harmonic maps in higher dimensions. J. Differential Geom. 28 (1988), no. 3, 485–502.
- Chen, Yunmei; Struwe, Michael (1989). "Existence and partial regularity results for the heat flow for harmonic maps". Mathematische Zeitschrift. 201 (1). Springer Science and Business Media LLC: 83–103. doi:10.1007/bf01161997. ISSN 0025-5874. S2CID 11210055.
- Shatah, Jalal; Struwe, Michael (1993). "Regularity Results for Nonlinear Wave Equations". The Annals of Mathematics. 138 (3). JSTOR: 503. doi:10.2307/2946554. ISSN 0003-486X. JSTOR 2946554.
- Shatah, Jalal; Struwe, Michael (1994). "Well-posedness in the energy space for semilinear wave equations with critical growth". International Mathematics Research Notices. 1994 (7). Oxford University Press (OUP): 303. doi:10.1155/s1073792894000346. ISSN 1073-7928.
- Struwe, Michael; Tarantello, Gabriella. On multivortex solutions in Chern-Simons gauge theory. Boll. Unione Mat. Ital. Sez. B Artic. Ric. Mat. (8) 1 (1998), no. 1, 109–121.
