= GDM =

GDM may refer to:

- Grupo Desportivo de Maputo, usually known as Desportivo Maputo, a Mozambican football club
- Gardner Municipal Airport (Massachusetts), by its IATA and FAA LID codes
- Giardini di Mirò, an Italian rock band
- Gesellschaft für Didaktik der Mathematik, a scientific society pursuing the goal to foster mathematics education, particularly in German-speaking countries
- Gestational diabetes mellitus
- Gibraltar Democratic Movement, a former Pro-British political party in Gibraltar
- GNOME Display Manager, for the windowing systems X11
- Gold Decoration for Merit, an honour of South Africa
- Google DeepMind, a British–American artificial intelligence research laboratory
- Gradient discretisation method, in numerical mathematics
- Grassroots Development Movement, a political party in Liberia
- Greyhound Mexico, a bus company in Mexico
