= Ghrist =

Ghrist is a surname. Notable people with the surname include:

- Jefferson L. Ghrist (born 1975), American politician
- Robert Ghrist (born 1969), American mathematician

== See also ==
- Grist
