= Joachim von zur Gathen =

German mathematician and computer scientist

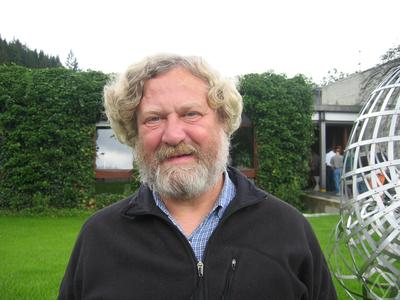
- von zur Gathen at Oberwolfach in 2007
- Born: 1950 (age 75–76)
- Education: ETH Zürich, Universität Zürich
- Known for: Modern Computer Algebra (book), Computational Complexity (journal)
- Scientific career
- Fields: Mathematics; Computer Science
- Workplaces: University of Toronto; Universität Paderborn; Universität Bonn
- Doctoral advisor: Volker Strassen

Joachim von zur Gathen (born 1950) is a German computer scientist. His research spans several areas in mathematics and computer science, including computational complexity, cryptography, finite fields, and computer algebra.

== Biography ==
Joachim von zur Gathen has a Diploma in Mathematik from ETH Zürich, and graduated as Dr. phil. from Universität Zürich in 1980 under the supervision of Volker Strassen. The title of his Ph.D. thesis is "Sekantenräume von Kurven". In 1981 he accepted a position in the Department of Computer Science at the University of Toronto, eventually becoming a Full Professor. In 1994, he moved to the Department of Mathematics at Universität Paderborn. Since 2004, he has been a professor at the B-IT and the Department of Computer Science at the Universität Bonn. He is the founding editor-in-chief of the Birkhäuser (now Springer) journal Computational Complexity.

A symposium at B-IT in 2010 was held in honor of his 60th birthday, and a special issue of the Journal of Symbolic Computation was published as a festschrift for the event.

== Selected publications ==
- von zur Gathen, Joachim; Gerhard, Jürgen (April 2013). Modern Computer Algebra (Third ed.). Cambridge University Press. ISBN 9781107039032. Translated into Japanese. Chinese edition.
