= Ilka Agricola =

German mathematician

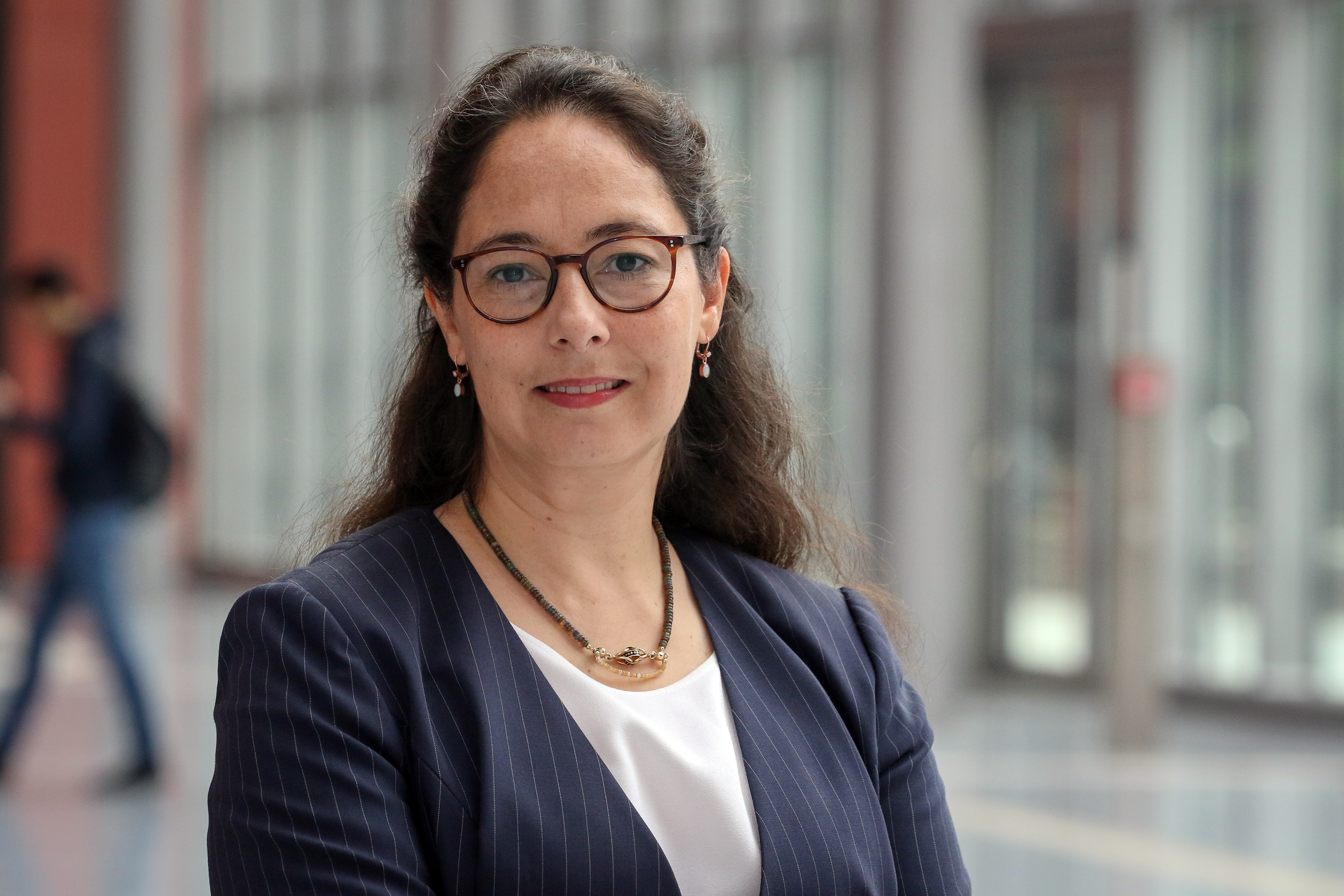
- Born: 8 August 1973; The Hague
- Education: Humboldt University of Berlin, Germany
- Occupation: mathematician
- Website: www.mathematik.uni-marburg.de/~agricola/

Ilka Agricola (born 8 August 1973 in The Hague) is a German mathematician specialising in differential geometry and its applications in mathematical physics. She is the dean of mathematics and computer science at Marburg University, where she has also been responsible for making the university's collection of mathematical models public.

== Life and work ==
Agricola studied physics at the Technical University of Munich and LMU Munich from 1991 to 1996. After a guest stay at Rutgers University in New Jersey (United States) that lasted until the end of 1997 she went to the Humboldt University of Berlin, where in 2000 she earned a mathematics doctorate under Thomas Friedrich.

From 2003 to 2008, she led one of the Volkswagen Foundation funded research groups at the Humboldt University of Berlin in the field of special geometries in mathematical physics. From 2004 to 2008, she was a project manager in the priority program for string theory at the German Research Foundation and the Collaborative Research Center 1080. Agricola took the Habilitation in 2004 at the University of Greifswald in mathematics. In 2008, she was appointed full professor at Marburg University. From November 2014 until October 2018, she has been Dean of the Department of Mathematics and Computer Science. She was president of the German Mathematical Society from 2021 to 2022.

Agricola is Editor-in-Chief of two academic journals in mathematics published by Springer Science+Business Media, Annals of Global Analysis and Geometry (since 2015) and Mathematische Semesterberichte (since 2021). She is an editor of the journal Communications in Mathematics published by De Gruyter.

As of September 2025, Agricola is chair of the Committee on Publishing of the International Mathematical Union.

== Awards and honors ==
In 2003, Ilka Agricola received the Medal of Honor of Charles University in Prague. In 2016, she was awarded the Ars legendi faculty prize of the Stifterverband für die Deutsche Wissenschaft and German Rectors' Conference for excellence in teaching mathematics. She was named a Fellow of the American Mathematical Society, in the 2022 class of fellows, "for contributions to differential geometry, in particular manifolds with special holonomy and on non-integrable geometric structures and for service to the mathematical community".

== Selected publications ==
=== Books ===
- Agricola, Ilka; Friedrich, Thomas (2002), Global analysis: Differential forms in analysis, geometry and physics, Graduate Studies in Mathematics, vol. 52, Providence, RI: American Mathematical Society, doi:10.1090/gsm/052, ISBN 0-8218-2951-3. Translated from the 2001 German original by Andreas Nestke.
- Agricola, Ilka; Friedrich, Thomas (2008), Elementary geometry, Student Mathematical Library, vol. 43, Providence, RI: American Mathematical Society, doi:10.1090/stml/043, ISBN 978-0-8218-4347-5. Translated from the 2005 German original by Philip G. Spain.

=== Papers ===
- Agricola, Ilka (2003), "Connections on naturally reductive spaces, their Dirac operator and homogeneous models in string theory", Communications in Mathematical Physics, 232 (3): 535–563, arXiv:math/0202094, Bibcode:2003CMaPh.232..535A, doi:10.1007/s00220-002-0743-y, MR 1952476, S2CID 10049585.
- Agricola, Ilka; Goodman, Roe (2003), "The algebra of K-invariant vector fields on a symmetric space G/K", Michigan Mathematical Journal, 51 (3): 607–630, arXiv:math/0207161, doi:10.1307/mmj/1070919563, MR 2021011, S2CID 8439498.
- Agricola, Ilka; Friedrich, Thomas (2004), "On the holonomy of connections with skew-symmetric torsion", Mathematische Annalen, 328 (4): 711–748, arXiv:math/0305069, doi:10.1007/s00208-003-0507-9, MR 2047649, S2CID 15084827.
- Agricola, Ilka (2008), "Old and new on the exceptional group G_{2}" (PDF), Notices of the American Mathematical Society, 55 (8): 922–929, MR 2441524.
