= Robert Ghrist =

American mathematician

- Born: 1969 (age 56–57); Euclid, Ohio, U.S.
- Education: University of Toledo (BS); Cornell University (MS, PhD)
- Awards: Presidential Early Career Award (2002); Chauvenet Prize (2013); Gauss Lectureship (2014)
- Scientific career
- Fields: Mathematics & Engineering
- Workplaces: University of Pennsylvania

Robert W. Ghrist (born 1969) is an American mathematician, known for his work on topological methods in applied mathematics.

== Life and work ==
Ghrist received his bachelor's degree in mechanical engineering from the University of Toledo in 1991, and in 1994 his master's degree and in 1995 his PhD from Cornell University under Philip Holmes with thesis The link of periodic orbits of a flow. From 1996 to 1998, he was R. H. Bing Instructor at the University of Texas and from 1998 an assistant professor and then from 2002 an associate professor at the Georgia Institute of Technology. In 2002 he became an associate professor and in 2004 a professor at the University of Illinois at Urbana-Champaign. From 2007, he was at the Information Trust Institute. In 2008, he was appointed Andrea Mitchell Penn Integrating Knowledge University Professor in Mathematics and Electrical/Systems Engineering at the University of Pennsylvania.

Ghrist was a visiting scientist in 1995 at the Institute for Advanced Study and in 2000 at the Isaac Newton Institute in Cambridge. He works on the application of topological methods to dynamical systems, robots, hydrodynamics, and information systems, such as sensor networks.

== Honors and awards ==
In 2002, Ghrist received a Presidential Early Career Award. In 2013, he received the Chauvenet Prize for Barcodes: The Persistent Topology of Data and in 2014 the Gauss Lectureship of the German Mathematical Society.

== Selected works ==
- Ghrist, Robert W.; Holmes, Philip; Sullivan, Michael (1997), Knots and Links in Three-dimensional Flows, Lecture Notes in Mathematics 1654, Springer Verlag, pp. x+208, ISBN 978-3540626282
- M. Farber; R. Ghrist; M. Burger; D. Koditschek, eds. (2007), Topology and Robotics, Contemporary Mathematics, American Mathematical Society, ISBN 978-0-8218-4246-1
- Ghrist, Robert W. (2014), Elementary Applied Topology, Createspace, ISBN 978-1502880857
- Ghrist, Robert (2008), "Barcodes: the persistent topology of data" (PDF), Bull. Amer. Math. Soc., 45: 61–75, doi:10.1090/s0273-0979-07-01191-3

== See also ==
- Topological data analysis
