= Cantor Medal =

Award in mathematics

The Cantor Medal of the Deutsche Mathematiker-Vereinigung is named in honor of Georg Cantor, the first president of the society. It is awarded at most every second year during the yearly meetings of the society. The prize winners are mathematicians who are associated with the German language. The prize money is €4.000.

== Prize winners ==
- 1990 Karl Stein
- 1992 Jürgen Moser
- 1994 Erhard Heinz
- 1996 Jacques Tits
- 1999 Volker Strassen
- 2002 Yuri Manin
- 2004 Friedrich Hirzebruch
- 2006 Hans Föllmer
- 2008 Hans Grauert
- 2010 Matthias Kreck
- 2012 Michael Struwe
- 2014 Herbert Spohn
- 2017 Gerd Faltings
- 2019 Hélène Esnault
- 2021 Martin Grötschel
- 2024 Felix Otto

== See also ==
- Gauss Lectureship
- List of mathematics awards
