= Dévissage =

Mathematical technique in algebraic geometry

In algebraic geometry, dévissage is a technique introduced by Alexander Grothendieck for proving statements about coherent sheaves on Noetherian schemes. Dévissage is an adaptation of a certain kind of Noetherian induction. It has many applications, including the proof of generic flatness and the proof that higher direct images of coherent sheaves under proper morphisms are coherent.

Laurent Gruson and Michel Raynaud extended this concept to the relative situation, that is, to the situation where the scheme under consideration is not necessarily noetherian, but instead admits a finitely presented morphism to another scheme. They did this by defining an object called a relative dévissage which is well-suited to certain kinds of inductive arguments. They used this technique to give a new criterion for a module to be flat. As a consequence, they were able to simplify and generalize the results of EGA IV 11 on descent of flatness.

The word dévissage is French for unscrewing.

== Grothendieck's dévissage theorem ==
Let X be a noetherian scheme. Let C be a collection of objects of the category of coherent O_{X}-modules which contains the zero sheaf and which has the property that, for any short exact sequence $0 \to A' \to A \to A'' \to 0$ of coherent sheaves, if two of A, A′, and A′′ are in C, then so is the third. Let X′ be a closed subspace of the underlying topological space of X. Suppose that for every irreducible closed subset Y of X′, there exists a coherent sheaf G in C whose fiber at the generic point y of Y is a one-dimensional vector space over the residue field k(y). Then every coherent O_{X}-module whose support is contained in X′ is contained in C.

In the particular case that X′ = X, the theorem says that C is the category of coherent O_{X}-modules. This is the setting in which the theorem is most often applied, but the statement above makes it possible to prove the theorem by noetherian induction.

A variation on the theorem is that if every direct factor of an object in C is again in C, then the condition that the fiber of G at x be one-dimensional can be replaced by the condition that the fiber is non-zero.

== Gruson and Raynaud's relative dévissages ==
Suppose that f : X → S is a finitely presented morphism of affine schemes, s is a point of S, and M is a finite type O_{X}-module. If n is a natural number, then Gruson and Raynaud define an S-dévissage in dimension n to consist of:

1. A closed finitely presented subscheme X′ of X containing the closed subscheme defined by the annihilator of M and such that the dimension of X′ ∩ f^{−1}(s) is less than or equal to n.
2. A scheme T and a factorization X′ → T → S of the restriction of f to X′ such that X′ → T is a finite morphism and T → S is a smooth affine morphism with geometrically integral fibers of dimension n. Denote the generic point of T ×_{S} k(s) by τ and the pushforward of M to T by N.
3. A free finite type O_{T}-module L and a homomorphism α : L → N such that α ⊗ k(τ) is bijective.

If n_{1}, n_{2}, ..., n_{r} is a strictly decreasing sequence of natural numbers, then an S-dévissage in dimensions n_{1}, n_{2}, ..., n_{r} is defined recursively as:

1. An S-dévissage in dimension n_{1}. Denote the cokernel of α by P_{1}.
2. An S-dévissage in dimensions n_{2}, ..., n_{r} of P_{1}.

The dévissage is said to lie between dimensions n_{1} and n_{r}. r is called the length of the dévissage. The last step of the recursion consists of a dévissage in dimension n_{r} which includes a morphism α_{r} : L_{r} → N_{r}. Denote the cokernel of this morphism by P_{r}. The dévissage is called total if P_{r} is zero.

Gruson and Raynaud prove in wide generality that locally, dévissages always exist. Specifically, let f : (X, x) → (S, s) be a finitely presented morphism of pointed schemes and M be an O_{X}-module of finite type whose fiber at x is non-zero. Set n equal to the dimension of M ⊗ k(s) and r to the codepth of M at s, that is, to n − depth(M ⊗ k(s)). Then there exist affine étale neighborhoods X′ of x and S′ of s, together with points x′ and s′ lifting x and s, such that the residue field extensions k(x) → k(x′) and k(s) → k(s′) are trivial, the map X′ → S factors through S′, this factorization sends x′ to s′, and that the pullback of M to X′ admits a total S′-dévissage at x′ in dimensions between n and n − r.

== Bibliography ==
- Grothendieck, Alexandre; Dieudonné, Jean (1961). "Eléments de géométrie algébrique: III. Étude cohomologique des faisceaux cohérents, Première partie". Publications Mathématiques de l'IHÉS. 11. doi:10.1007/bf02684274. MR 0217085.
- Grothendieck, Alexandre; Dieudonné, Jean (1964). "Éléments de géométrie algébrique: IV. Étude locale des schémas et des morphismes de schémas, Première partie". Publications Mathématiques de l'IHÉS. 20. doi:10.1007/bf02684747. MR 0173675.
- Gruson, Laurent; Raynaud, Michel (1971), "Critéres de platitude et de projectivité", Inventiones Mathematicae (in French), 13: 1–17, doi:10.1007/bf01390094, ISSN 0020-9910
