= Reinhold Remmert =

German mathematician

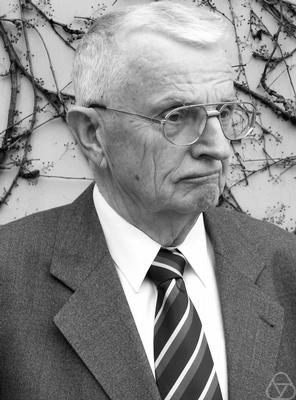
Reinhold Remmert

Reinhold W. Remmert (22 June 1930 – 9 March 2016) was a German mathematician. Born in Osnabrück, Lower Saxony, he studied mathematics, mathematical logic and physics in Münster. He established and developed the theory of complex-analytic spaces in joint work with Hans Grauert. Until his retirement in 1995, he was a professor for complex analysis in Münster.

Remmert wrote two books on number theory and complex analysis, which contain a huge amount of historical information together with references on important papers in the subject.

== See also ==
- Remmert–Stein theorem

== Important publications ==
- Remmert, Reinhold (1991). Theory of complex functions. New York: Springer-Verlag. ISBN 0-387-97195-5. OCLC 21118309.
- Remmert, Reinhold (1998). Classical topics in complex function theory. New York: Springer. ISBN 0-387-98221-3. OCLC 36521048.
