= Martin Schottenloher =

German mathematician

Martin Schottenloher is a German mathematician.

== Life ==
He was born on July 25, 1944, in Lindau, Germany.

He specializes in algorithms, artificial intelligence and complex analysis.

== Career ==
He completed his Dr. rer. nat. degree at LMU Munich in 1972. His doctoral supervisors were Walter Roelcke and Karl Stein. He obtained his habilitation in 1975 also from LMU Munich.

At LMU Munich, he supervised the doctoral dissertations of more than a dozen students.

== Bibliography ==
Some of his books and papers are:

- Schottenloher, Martin (2008). A mathematical introduction to conformal field theory. Berlin: Springer. ISBN 978-3-540-68628-6. OCLC 288564237.
- Sachsenmeier, Peter; Schottenloher, Martin (2003). Challenges Between Competition and Collaboration : the Future of the European Manufacturing Industry. Berlin, Heidelberg: Springer Berlin Heidelberg. ISBN 978-3-662-05195-5. OCLC 851392645.
- Husemöller, Dale (2008). Basic bundle theory and K-cohomology invariants. Berlin: Springer. ISBN 978-3-540-74956-1. OCLC 233973513.
- Schottenloher, Martin (1995). Geometrie und Symmetrie in der Physik. Wiesbaden: Vieweg+Teubner Verlag. doi:10.1007/978-3-322-89928-6. ISBN 978-3-528-06565-2.
