= Joachim Escher =

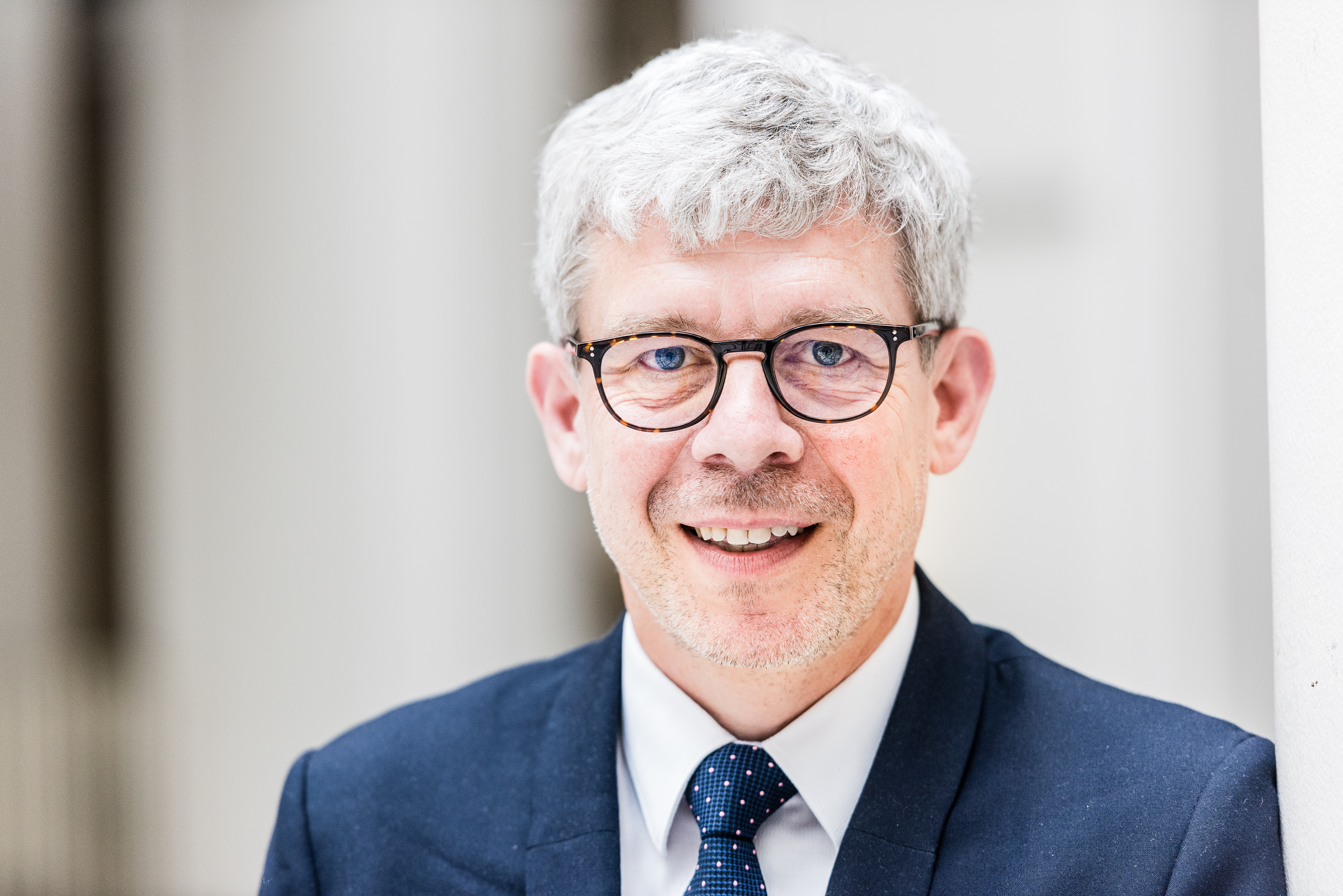
Joachim Escher in the atrium of Leibniz University Hannover

Joachim Escher (born 24 March 1962 in Lörrach) is a German mathematician and university professor. He is a professor at Leibniz University Hannover and since January 2015 has been vice president for Faculty Appointments, Personnel Development, and Continuing Academic Education.

== Biography ==
Joachim Escher grew up in Switzerland and studied mathematics, theoretical physics, and astronomy at the University of Zürich. In 1991 he received his doctorate there for his work Über quasilineare parabolische Probleme (transl. On quasilinear parabolic problems) and went to Besançon with a post-doc fellowship. He then spent two years as an assistant in Basel, where he received his habilitation in 1996 with a thesis entitled "Free boundaries in porous media" (German: Freie Ränder in porösen Medien). In 1997 he was appointed to the University of Kassel, and later he moved to Leibniz University Hannover.

He has been the editor-in-chief of the journal Nonlinear Analysis: Real World Applications since 2012. Furthermore, he serves as a co-editor of various mathematical journals. From 2005 to 2011, he was a co-editor of the SIAM Journal on Mathematical Analysis.

He specializes in partial differential equations, especially with mathematical fluid mechanics, geometric evolution equations, and free boundary value problems. He is working intensively on the mathematical modeling of waves.

Together with his doctoral advisor Herbert Amann, Joachim Escher wrote a three-part textbook on mathematical analysis.

He was vice president of the German Mathematical Society from 2021 to 2022 and president from 2023 to 2024.

== Writings ==
- Joachim Escher, Adrian Constantin: Analyticity of periodic traveling free surface water waves, Annals of Math. Volume 173, 2011, 559–568.
- Joachim Escher, Adrian Constantin: Wave breaking for nonlinear nonlocal shallow water equations. Acta Mathematica, Volume 181, 1998, 229–243.
- Joachim Escher, Bogdan Matioc: On the analyticity of periodic gravity water waves with integrable vorticity function. Differential Integral Equations, Volume 27, 2014, 217–232.
- Joachim Escher, Zhaoyang Yin: Initial boundary value problems for nonlinear dispersive wave equations. J. Funct. Anal. Volume 256, 2009, 479–508.
- Joachim Escher, Zhaoyang Yin: Well-posedness, blow-up phenomena, and global solutions for the b-equation. J. Reine Angew. Math. Volume 624, 2008, 51–80.
- Joachim Escher, Boris Kolev: Geodesic completeness for Sobolev Hs-metrics on the diffeomorphism group of the circle, J. Evol. Equ. Volume 14, 2014, 949–968.
- Joachim Escher, Kazuo Ito: Some dynamic properties of volume preserving curvature driven flows. Math. Ann. Volume 333, 2005, 213–230.
- Joachim Escher, Anca Matioc, Bogdan Matioc: A generalized Rayleigh-Taylor condition for the Muskat problem, Nonlinearity Volume 25, 2012, 73–92.
- Classical solutions to a moving boundary problem for an elliptic-parabolic system. Interfaces Free Boundaries, Volume 6, 2004, 175–193.
- Joachim Escher, Phillipe Laurençot, Christoph Walker: A parabolic free boundary problem modeling electrostatic MEMS, Arch. Ration. Mech. Anal. Volume 211, 2014, 389–417.
- Herbert Amann, Joachim Escher: Analysis I, Birkhäuser, Basel 2006, ISBN 978-3-7643-7755-7.
- Analysis II, Birkhäuser, Basel 2006, ISBN 978-3-7643-7105-0.
- Analysis III, Birkhäuser, Basel 2001, ISBN 978-3-7643-6613-1.

== Prizes and awards ==
- Joachim Escher has been a full member of the Braunschweig Scientific Society (BWG) since 2019.
