= Gauss Lectureship =

Mathematics award

The Gauss Lectureship (Gauß-Vorlesung) is an annually awarded mathematical distinction, named in honor of Carl Friedrich Gauss. It was established in 2001 by the German Mathematical Society with a series of lectures for a broad audience.

Each Gauss Lecture is paired with another presentation on the history of mathematics.

== Gauss Lecturers ==
Year	Gauss Lecturer
2001	Gerhard Huisken
2002	Ralph Erskine
2003	Thomas Sonar
2003	Karl Sigmund
2004	Isadore Singer
2005	Rupert Klein
2005	Günter M. Ziegler
2006	Stefan Müller
2006	Penelope Maddy
2007	Don Zagier
2007	Willi Jäger
2008	John Morgan
2008	Bernold Fiedler
2009	Felix Otto
2009	Hendrik Lenstra
2010	Walter Schachermayer
2010	E. Brian Davies
2011	Michael Struwe
2011	Wolfgang Dahmen
2012	Friedrich Götze
2012	Matthias Kreck
2013	Ben Green
2013	Jürgen Richter-Gebert
2014	Robert Ghrist
2015	Martin J. Gander
2015	Volker Mehrmann
2015	Ingrid Daubechies
2016	Nicolas Monod
2017	Helmut Pottmann
2017	Werner Ballmann
2017	Cedric Villani
2018	Katrin Wendland
2018	Caroline Lasser
2019	Laszlo Szekelyhidi
2019	Michael J. Hopkins
2020	no lecture held
2021	Maryna Viazovska
2021	Valentin Blomer
2022	Ulrike Tillmann
2022	László Lovász
2023	Manfred Lehn
2023	Martin Hairer
2024	Monique Laurent
2024	Lisa Sauermann
2025	Karl-Theodor Sturm
2025	Helmut Hofer
2026	Karen Willcox
2026	Marcus du Sautoy

== See also ==
- Cantor Medal
- List of mathematics awards
