= Grothendieck's connectedness theorem =

In mathematics, Grothendieck's connectedness theorem, states that if A is a complete Noetherian local ring whose spectrum is k-connected and f is in the maximal ideal, then Spec(A/fA) is (k − 1)-connected. Here a Noetherian scheme is called k-connected if its dimension is greater than k and the complement of every closed subset of dimension less than k is connected.

It is a local analogue of Bertini's theorem.

== See also ==
- Zariski connectedness theorem
- Fulton–Hansen connectedness theorem

== Bibliography ==
- Grothendieck, Alexander; Raynaud, Michel (2005) [1968], Séminaire de Géométrie Algébrique du Bois Marie - 1962 - Cohomologie locale des faisceaux cohérents et théorèmes de Lefschetz locaux et globaux - (SGA 2), Documents Mathématiques 4 (in French) (Updated ed.), Société Mathématique de France, pp. x+208, ISBN 2-85629-169-4
- Lazarsfeld, Robert (2004), Positivity in Algebraic Geometry, Springer, ISBN 3-540-22533-1
