= Formal holomorphic function =

In algebraic geometry, a formal holomorphic function along a subvariety V of an algebraic variety W is an algebraic analog of a holomorphic function defined in a neighborhood of V. They are sometimes just called holomorphic functions when no confusion can arise. They were introduced by Oscar Zariski (1949, 1951).

The theory of formal holomorphic functions has largely been replaced by the theory of formal schemes which generalizes it: a formal holomorphic function on a variety is essentially just a section of the structure sheaf of a related formal scheme.

== Definition ==
If V is an affine subvariety of the affine variety W defined by an ideal I of the coordinate ring R of W, then a formal holomorphic function along V is just an element of the completion of R at the ideal I.

In general holomorphic functions along a subvariety V of W are defined by gluing together holomorphic functions on affine subvarieties.
