= German Mathematical Society =

German professional society

Deutsche Mathematiker-Vereinigung
- Abbreviation: DMV
- Formerly: Mathematical Society of the German Democratic Republic
- Established: 18 September 1890 (135 years ago)
- Legal status: registered association
- Headquarters: Berlin
- Country: Germany
- Membership: 4,813 (2023)
- Revenue: 446,558 euro (2022)
- Website: www.mathematik.de

The German Mathematical Society (German: Deutsche Mathematiker-Vereinigung, DMV) is the main professional society of German mathematicians and represents German mathematics within the European Mathematical Society (EMS) and the International Mathematical Union (IMU). It was founded in 1890 in Bremen with the set theorist Georg Cantor as first president. Founding members included Georg Cantor, Felix Klein, Walther von Dyck, David Hilbert, Hermann Minkowski, Carl Runge, Rudolf Sturm, Hermann Schubert, and Heinrich Weber.

The current president of the DMV is Jürg Kramer.

== Activities ==
In honour of its founding president, Georg Cantor, the society awards the Cantor Medal. The DMV publishes two scientific journals, the Jahresbericht der DMV and Documenta Mathematica. It also publishes a quarterly magazine for its membership the Mitteilungen der DMV. The annual meeting of the DMV is called the Jahrestagung; the DMV traditionally meets every four years together with the Austrian Mathematical Society (ÖMG) and every four years together with the Gesellschaft für Didaktik der Mathematik (GDM). It sometimes organises its meetings jointly with other societies (e.g., 2014 with the Polish Mathematical Society, PTM, or 2016 with the Gesellschaft für Angewandte Mathematik und Mechanik, GAMM). Twice annually, it organises the Gauß Lecture, a public audience lecture by well-known mathematicians.

== Governance ==
See Category:Presidents of the German Mathematical Society

Since 1995, the DMV is led by a president, before that by a chairperson.

- 1890–1893: Georg Cantor
- 1894: Paul Gordan
- 1895, 1904: Heinrich Weber
- 1896, 1907: Alexander von Brill
- 1897, 1903 und 1908: Felix Klein
- 1898: Aurel Voss
- 1899: Max Noether
- 1900: David Hilbert
- 1901, 1912: Walther von Dyck
- 1902: Wilhelm Franz Meyer
- 1905: Paul Stäckel
- 1906: Alfred Pringsheim
- 1909: Martin Krause, Dresden
- 1910: Friedrich Engel
- 1911: Friedrich Schur
- 1913: Karl Rohn
- 1914: Carl Runge
- 1915: Sebastian Finsterwalder
- 1916: Ludwig Kiepert
- 1917: Kurt Hensel
- 1918: Otto Hölder
- 1919: Hans von Mangoldt
- 1920: Robert Fricke
- 1921: Edmund Landau
- 1922: Arthur Moritz Schoenflies
- 1923: Erich Hecke
- 1924: Otto Blumenthal
- 1925: Heinrich Tietze
- 1926: Hans Hahn
- 1927: Friedrich Schilling, Danzig
- 1928, 1936: Erhard Schmidt
- 1929: Adolf Kneser
- 1930: Rudolf Rothe, Berlin
- 1931: Ernst Sigismund Fischer
- 1932: Hermann Weyl
- 1933: Richard Baldus
- 1934: Oskar Perron
- 1935: Georg Hamel
- 1937: Walther Lietzmann
- 1938–1945: Wilhelm Süss
- 1946: Kurt Reidemeister
- 1948–1952: Erich Kamke
- 1953, 1955: Georg Nöbeling
- 1954: Hellmuth Kneser
- 1956: Karl Heinrich Weise
- 1957: Emanuel Sperner
- 1958: Gottfried Köthe
- 1959: Willi Rinow
- 1960: Wilhelm Maak
- 1961: Ott-Heinrich Keller
- 1962: Friedrich Hirzebruch
- 1963: Wolfgang Haack
- 1964–1965: Heinrich Behnke
- 1966: Karl Stein
- 1967: Wolfgang Franz
- 1968–1977: Martin Barner
- 1977: Heinz Bauer
- 1978, 1979: Hermann Witting
- 1980–1981: Gerd Fischer
- 1982–1983: Helmut Werner, Bonn
- 1984–1985: Albrecht Dold
- 1986–1987: Wolfgang Schwarz
- 1988–1989: Willi Törnig
- 1990: Friedrich Hirzebruch
- 1991–1992: Winfried Scharlau
- 1993–1994: Martin Grötschel
- 1995–1997: Ina Kersten
- 1998–1999: Karl-Heinz Hoffmann
- 2000–2001: Gernot Stroth
- 2002–2003: Peter Gritzmann
- 2004–2005: Günther Wildenhain
- 2006–2008: Günter M. Ziegler
- 2009–2010: Wolfgang Lück
- 2011–2012: Christian Bär
- 2013–2014: Jürg Kramer
- 2015–2016: Volker Bach
- 2017–2018: Michael Röckner
- 2019–2020: Friedrich Götze
- 2021–2022: Ilka Agricola
- 2023–2024: Joachim Escher
- 2025: Jürg Kramer

== See also ==
- List of mathematical societies
