= Analytic space =

An analytic space is a generalization of an analytic manifold that allows singularities. An analytic space is a space that is locally the same as an analytic variety. They are prominent in the study of several complex variables, but they also appear in other contexts.

== Definition ==
Fix a field k with a valuation. Assume that the field is complete and not discrete with respect to this valuation. For example, this includes R and C with respect to their usual absolute values, as well as fields of Puiseux series with respect to their natural valuations.

Let U be an open subset of k^{n}, and let f_{1}, ..., f_{k} be a collection of analytic functions on U. Denote by Z the common vanishing locus of f_{1}, ..., f_{k}, that is, let Z = { x | f_{1}(x) = ... = f_{k}(x) = 0 }. Z is an analytic variety. Suppose that the structure sheaf of U is $\mathcal{O}_U$. Then Z has a structure sheaf $\mathcal{O}_Z = \mathcal{O}_U / \mathcal{I}_Z$, where $\mathcal{I}_Z$ is the ideal sheaf generated by f_{1}, ..., f_{k}. In other words, the structure sheaf of Z consists of all functions on U modulo the possible ways they can differ outside of Z.

An analytic space is a locally ringed space $(X, \mathcal{O}_X)$ such that around every point x of X, there exists an open neighborhood U such that $(U, \mathcal{O}_U)$ is isomorphic (as locally ringed spaces) to an analytic variety with its structure sheaf. Such an isomorphism is called a local model for X at x.

An analytic mapping or morphism of analytic spaces is a morphism of locally ringed spaces.

This definition is similar to the definition of a scheme. The only difference is that for a scheme, the local models are spectra of rings, whereas for an analytic space, the local models are analytic varieties. Because of this, the basic theories of analytic spaces and of schemes are very similar. Furthermore, analytic varieties have much simpler behavior than arbitrary commutative rings (for example, analytic varieties are defined over fields and are always finite-dimensional), so analytic spaces behave very similarly to finite-type schemes over a field.

== Basic results ==
Every point in an analytic space has a local dimension. The dimension at x is found by choosing a local model at x and determining the local dimension of the analytic variety at the point corresponding to x.

Every point in an analytic space has a tangent space. If x is a point of X and m_{x} is ideal sheaf of all functions vanishing at x, then the cotangent space at x is m_{x} / m_{x}^{2}. The tangent space is (m_{x} / m_{x}^{2})^{*}, the dual vector space to the cotangent space. Analytic mappings induce pushforward maps on tangent spaces and pullback maps on cotangent spaces.

The dimension of the tangent space at x is called the embedding dimension at x. By looking at a local model it is easy to see that the dimension is always less than or equal to the embedding dimension.

== Smoothness ==
An analytic space is called smooth at x if it has a local model at x which is an open subset of k^{n} for some n. The analytic space is called smooth if it is smooth at every point, and in this case it is an analytic manifold. The subset of points at which an analytic space is not smooth is a closed analytic subset.

An analytic space is reduced if every local model for the space is defined by a radical sheaf of ideals. An analytic space X which isn't reduced has a reduction X_{red}, a reduced analytic space with the same underlying topological space. There is a canonical morphism r : X_{red} → X. Every morphism from X to a reduced analytic space factors through r.

An analytic space is normal if every stalk of the structure sheaf is a normal ring (meaning an integrally closed integral domain). In a normal analytic space, the singular locus has codimension at least two. When X is a local complete intersection at x, then X is normal at x.

Non-normal analytic spaces can be smoothed out into normal spaces in a canonical way. This construction is called the normalization. The normalization N(X) of an analytic space X comes with a canonical map ν : N(X) → X. Every dominant morphism from a normal analytic space to X factors through ν.

== Coherent sheaves ==
An analytic space is coherent if its structure sheaf $\mathcal{O}$ is a coherent sheaf. A coherent sheaf of $\mathcal{O}$-modules is called a coherent analytic sheaf. For example, on a coherent space, locally free sheaves and sheaves of ideals are coherent analytic sheaves.

Analytic spaces over algebraically closed fields are coherent. In the complex case, this is known as the Oka coherence theorem. This is not true over non-algebraically closed fields; there are examples of real analytic spaces that are not coherent.

== Generalizations ==
In some situations, the concept of an analytic space is too restrictive. This is often because the ground field has additional structure that is not captured by analytic sets. In these situations, there are generalizations of analytic spaces which allow more flexibility in the local model spaces.

For example, over the real numbers, consider the circle x^{2} + y^{2} = 1. The circle is an analytic subset of the analytic space R^{2}. But its projection onto the x-axis is the closed interval [−1, 1], which is not an analytic set. Therefore the image of an analytic set under an analytic map is not necessarily an analytic set. This can be avoided by working with subanalytic sets, which are much less rigid than analytic sets but which are not defined over arbitrary fields. The corresponding generalization of an analytic space is a subanalytic space. (However, under mild point-set topology hypotheses, it turns out that subanalytic spaces are essentially equivalent to subanalytic sets.)

== See also ==
- Analytic variety
- Complex analytic space
