= Formal scheme =

Type of space in mathematics

In mathematics, specifically in algebraic geometry, a formal scheme is a type of space which includes data about its surroundings. Unlike an ordinary scheme, a formal scheme includes infinitesimal data that, in effect, points in a direction off of the scheme. For this reason, formal schemes frequently appear in topics such as deformation theory. But the concept is also used to prove a theorem such as the theorem on formal functions, which is used to deduce theorems of interest for usual schemes.

A locally Noetherian scheme is a locally Noetherian formal scheme in the canonical way: the formal completion along itself. In other words, the category of locally Noetherian formal schemes contains all locally Noetherian schemes.

Formal schemes were motivated by and generalize Zariski's theory of formal holomorphic functions.

Algebraic geometry based on formal schemes is called formal algebraic geometry.

== Definition ==
Formal schemes are usually defined only in the Noetherian case. While there have been several definitions of non-Noetherian formal schemes, these encounter technical problems. Consequently, we will only define locally Noetherian formal schemes.

All rings will be assumed to be commutative and with unit. Let A be a (Noetherian) topological ring, that is, a ring A which is a topological space such that the operations of addition and multiplication are continuous. A is linearly topologized if zero has a base consisting of ideals. An ideal of definition $\mathcal{J}$ for a linearly topologized ring is an open ideal such that for every open neighborhood V of 0, there exists a positive integer n such that $\mathcal{J}^n \subseteq V$. A linearly topologized ring is preadmissible if it admits an ideal of definition, and it is admissible if it is also complete. (In the terminology of Bourbaki, this is "complete and separated".)

Assume that A is admissible, and let $\mathcal{J}$ be an ideal of definition. A prime ideal is open if and only if it contains $\mathcal{J}$. The set of open prime ideals of A, or equivalently the set of prime ideals of $A/\mathcal{J}$, is the underlying topological space of the formal spectrum of A, denoted Spf A. Spf A has a structure sheaf which is defined using the structure sheaf of the spectrum of a ring. Let $\mathcal{J}_\lambda$ be a neighborhood basis for zero consisting of ideals of definition. All the spectra of $A/\mathcal{J}_\lambda$ have the same underlying topological space but a different structure sheaf. The structure sheaf of Spf A is the projective limit $\varprojlim_\lambda \mathcal{O}_{\text{Spec} A/\mathcal{J}_\lambda}$.

It can be shown that if f ∈ A and D_{f} is the set of all open prime ideals of A not containing f, then $\mathcal{O}_{\text{Spf} A}(D_f) = \widehat{A_f}$, where $\widehat{A_f}$ is the completion of the localization A_{f}.

Finally, a locally Noetherian formal scheme is a topologically ringed space $(\mathfrak{X}, \mathcal{O}_{\mathfrak{X}})$ (that is, a ringed space whose sheaf of rings is a sheaf of topological rings) such that each point of $\mathfrak{X}$ admits an open neighborhood isomorphic (as topologically ringed spaces) to the formal spectrum of a Noetherian ring.

== Morphisms between formal schemes ==
A morphism $f: \mathfrak{X} \to \mathfrak{Y}$ of locally Noetherian formal schemes is a morphism of them as locally ringed spaces such that the induced map $f^{\#}: \Gamma(U, \mathcal{O}_\mathfrak{Y}) \to \Gamma(f^{-1}(U), \mathcal{O}_\mathfrak{X})$ is a continuous homomorphism of topological rings for any affine open subset U.

f is said to be adic or $\mathfrak{X}$ is a $\mathfrak{Y}$-adic formal scheme if there exists an ideal of definition $\mathcal{I}$ such that $f^*(\mathcal{I}) \mathcal{O}_\mathfrak{X}$ is an ideal of definition for $\mathfrak{X}$. If f is adic, then this property holds for any ideal of definition.

== Examples ==
For any ideal $I$ and ring $A$ we can define the $I$-adic topology on $A$, defined by its basis consisting of sets of the form $a+I^n$. This is preadmissible, and admissible if $A$ is $I$-adically complete. In this case $\operatorname{Spf} A$ is the topological space $\operatorname{Spec} A/I$ with sheaf of rings $\lim_n \mathcal{O}_{\text{Spec} A/I^n}=\lim_n \widetilde{A/I^n}$ instead of $\widetilde{A/I}$.

1. $A = k [ \! [ t ] \! ]$ and $I = (t)$. Then $A/I = k$ so the space $\operatorname{Spf} A$ a single point $(t)$ on which its structure sheaf takes value $k [ \! [ t ] \! ]$. Compare this to $\operatorname{Spec} A/I$, whose structure sheaf takes value $k$ at this point: this is an example of the idea that $\operatorname{Spf} A$ is a 'formal thickening' of $A$ about $I$.
2. The formal completion of a closed subscheme. Consider the closed subscheme $X$ of the affine plane over $k$, defined by the ideal $I = (y^2 - x^3)$. Note that $A_0 = k[x,y]$ is not $I$-adically complete; write $A$ for its $I$-adic completion. In this case, $\operatorname{Spf} A = X$ as spaces and its structure sheaf is $\lim_n \widetilde{k[x,y]/I^n}$. Its global sections are $A$, as opposed to $X$ whose global sections are $A/I$.

== See also ==
- formal holomorphic function
- Deformation theory
- Schlessinger's theorem
