= Fulton–Hansen connectedness theorem =

In mathematics, the Fulton–Hansen connectedness theorem is a result from intersection theory in algebraic geometry, for the case of subvarieties of projective space with codimension large enough to make the intersection have components of dimension at least 1. It is named after William Fulton and Johan Hansen, who proved it in 1979.

The formal statement is that if V and W are irreducible algebraic subvarieties of a projective space P, all over an algebraically closed field, and if

$$\dim(V) + \dim (W) > \dim (P)$$

in terms of the dimension of an algebraic variety, then the intersection U of V and W is connected.

More generally, the theorem states that if $Z$ is a projective variety and $f\colon Z \to P^n \times P^n$ is any morphism such that $\dim f(Z) > n$, then $f^{-1}\Delta$ is connected, where $\Delta$ is the diagonal in $P^n \times P^n$. The special case of intersections is recovered by taking $Z = V \times W$, with $f$ the natural inclusion.

== See also ==
- Zariski's connectedness theorem
- Grothendieck's connectedness theorem
- Deligne's connectedness theorem
