= Gesellschaft für Didaktik der Mathematik =

The Gesellschaft für Didaktik der Mathematik (GDM) (Society for Didactics of Mathematics) is a scientific society pursuing the goal to foster mathematics education, particularly in German-speaking countries. It seeks cooperation with the respective institutions in other countries.

== Main interests ==
The society primarily concerns itself with:

- the teaching and learning of mathematics
- researching and implementing mathematics in schools
- identifying students' and teachers' beliefs about mathematics and improving the attitude towards it

== Annual meeting ==
The society holds an annual meeting in Germany — the Tagung für Didaktik der Mathematik.

== Journal publications ==
=== Mitteilungen der GDM ===
The members' journal Mitteilungen der GDM (Proceedings of the GDM) is published twice a year. The editor is Andreas Vohns, Klagenfurt, on behalf of the executive board.

=== Journal für Mathematik-Didaktik ===
The Journal für Mathematik-Didaktik (Journal for Didactics of Mathematics) is the official organ of the GDM. Published quarterly, it contains original articles from all areas of mathematics education research and development. All articles are peer-reviewed by three anonymous referees. Decisions about the publication and modifications are made by the editorial board. Submissions are open to related sciences (pedagogy, psychology, sociology or philosophy) and neighbour sciences (didactics of science or languages). All articles, however, are related to the teaching and learning of mathematics.

=== Conference proceedings ===
The GDM is responsible for the annual meeting of the society, the Tagung für Didaktik der Mathematik. The presentations of the conference are published in the series Beiträge zum Mathematikunterricht. The German proceedings were published until 2007 at Verlag Franzbecker and can be ordered online. Starting 2008, they are published by WTM-Verlag, Münster and are available online. Starting with the 2005 proceedings an electronic version can be found here.
