= Zariski's connectedness theorem =

In algebraic geometry, Zariski's connectedness theorem (due to Oscar Zariski) says that under certain conditions the fibers of a morphism of varieties are connected. It is an extension of Zariski's main theorem to the case when the morphism of varieties need not be birational.

Zariski's connectedness theorem gives a rigorous version of the "principle of degeneration" introduced by Federigo Enriques, which says roughly that a limit of absolutely irreducible cycles is absolutely connected.

== Statement ==
Suppose that f is a proper surjective morphism of varieties from X to Y such that the function field of Y is separably closed in that of X. Then Zariski's connectedness theorem says that the inverse image of any normal point of Y is connected. An alternative version says that if f is proper and f_{*} O_{X} = O_{Y}, then f is surjective and the inverse image of any point of Y is connected.
