= Karl Stein (mathematician) =

German mathematician

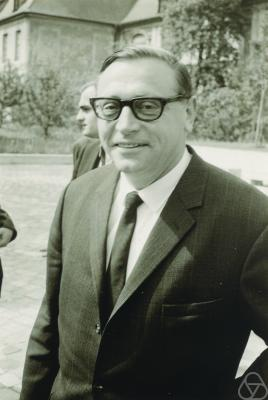
- Karl Stein in Eichstätt, 1968
- Born: Frank Reginald Nunes Nabarro; 1 January 1913; Hamm, Westphalia
- Died: 19 October 2000 (aged 87); Ebersbach an der Fils, Baden-Württemberg
- Education: University of Münster
- Known for: Stein manifold Stein factorization Behnke–Stein theorem Behnke–Stein theorem on Stein manifolds Remmert–Stein theorem
- Awards: Cantor Medal (1990)
- Scientific career
- Fields: Complex analysis Cryptography
- Workplaces: Ludwig-Maximilians-Universität München
- Academic advisors: Heinrich Behnke
- Doctoral students: Otto Forster; Gunther Schmidt; Martin Schottenloher

Karl Stein (1 January 1913 in Hamm, Westphalia – 19 October 2000) was a German mathematician. He is well known for complex analysis and cryptography. Stein manifolds and Stein factorization are named after him.

== Career ==
Karl Stein received his doctorate with his dissertation on the topic Zur Theorie der Funktionen mehrerer komplexer Veränderlichen; Die Regularitätshüllen niederdimensionaler Mannigfaltigkeiten at the University of Münster under the supervision of Heinrich Behnke in 1937. Karl Stein was conscripted into the Wehrmacht sometime before 1942, and trained as a cryptographer to work at OKW/Chi, the Cipher Department of the High Command of the Wehrmacht. He was assigned to manage the OKW/Chi IV, Subsection a, which was a unit responsible for security of own processes, cipher devices testing, and invention of new cipher devices. He managed a staff of 11 In 1955, he became professor at the Ludwig-Maximilians-Universität München and emeritated in 1981. In 1990, he received the first Cantor medal.

=== Students ===
Stein's doctoral students included Michael Schneider, Otto Forster, Ivo Schneider, Gunther Schmidt and Martin Schottenloher.
