= Complex analytic variety =

Generalization of a complex manifold that allows the use of singularities

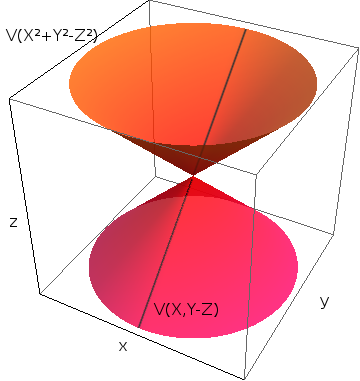
A cone is not a complex manifold, but it is a complex analytic variety.

In mathematics, particularly differential geometry and complex geometry, a complex analytic variety (Note: A complex analytic variety is sometimes required to be irreducible and (or) reduced.) or complex analytic space is a generalization of a complex manifold that allows the presence of singularities. Complex analytic varieties are locally ringed spaces that are locally isomorphic to local model spaces, where a local model space is an open subset of the vanishing locus of a finite set of holomorphic functions.

Complex analytic varieties are analogous to algebraic varieties. Roughly speaking, a complex analytic variety is a zero locus of a set of a complex analytic function, while an algebraic variety is a zero locus of a set of a polynomial function.

== Definition ==
Denote the constant sheaf on a topological space with value $\mathbb{C}$ by $\underline{\mathbb{C}}$. A $\mathbb{C}$-space is a locally ringed space $(X, \mathcal{O}_X)$, whose structure sheaf is an algebra over $\underline{\mathbb{C}}$.

Choose an open subset $U$ of some complex affine space $\mathbb{C}^n$, and fix finitely many holomorphic functions $f_1,\dots,f_k$ in $U$. Let $X=V(f_1,\dots,f_k)$ be the common vanishing locus of these holomorphic functions, that is, $X=\{x\mid f_1(x)=\cdots=f_k(x)=0\}$. Define a sheaf of rings on $X$ by letting $\mathcal{O}_X$ be the restriction to $X$ of $\mathcal{O}_U/(f_1, \ldots, f_k)$, where $\mathcal{O}_U$ is the sheaf of holomorphic functions on $U$. Then the locally ringed $\mathbb{C}$-space $(X, \mathcal{O}_X)$ is a local model space.

A complex analytic variety is a locally ringed $\mathbb{C}$-space $(X, \mathcal{O}_X)$ that is locally isomorphic to a local model space.

Morphisms of complex analytic varieties are defined to be morphisms of the underlying locally ringed spaces, they are also called holomorphic maps. A structure sheaf may have nilpotent elements; if the structure sheaf is reduced, then the complex analytic space is called reduced.

An associated complex analytic space (variety) $X_h$ is such that:

Let X be a scheme of finite type over $\mathbb{C}$, and cover X with open affine subsets $Y_i = \operatorname{Spec} A_i$ ($X =\cup Y_i$) (Spectrum of a ring). Then each $A_i$ is an algebra of finite type over $\mathbb{C}$, and $A_i \simeq \mathbb{C}[z_1, \dots, z_n]/(f_1,\dots, f_m)$, where $f_1,\dots, f_m$ are polynomials in $z_1, \dots, z_n$, which can be regarded as a holomorphic functions on $\mathbb{C}$. Therefore, their set of common zeros is the complex analytic subspace $(Y_i)_h \subseteq \mathbb{C}$. Here, the scheme X is obtained by glueing the data of the sets $Y_i$, and then the same data can be used for glueing the complex analytic spaces $(Y_i)_h$ into a complex analytic space $X_h$, so we call $X_h$ an associated complex analytic space with X. The complex analytic space X is reduced if and only if the associated complex analytic space $X_h$ is reduced.

== See also ==
- Analytic space
- Complex algebraic variety
- GAGA – Two closely related mathematical subjects
- Rigid analytic space – Analogue of a complex analytic space over a nonarchimedean field

== Future reading ==
- Huckleberry, Alan (2013). "Hans Grauert (1930–2011)". Jahresbericht der Deutschen Mathematiker-Vereinigung. 115: 21–45. arXiv:1303.6933. doi:10.1365/s13291-013-0061-7. S2CID 256084531.
