= Noetherian scheme =

Concept in algebraic geometry

In algebraic geometry, a Noetherian scheme is a scheme that admits a finite covering by open affine subsets $\operatorname{Spec} A_i$, where each $A_i$ is a Noetherian ring. More generally, a scheme is locally Noetherian if it is covered by spectra of Noetherian rings. Thus, a scheme is Noetherian if and only if it is locally Noetherian and compact. As with Noetherian rings, the concept is named after Emmy Noether.

It can be shown that, in a locally Noetherian scheme, if $\operatorname{Spec} A$ is an open affine subset, then A is a Noetherian ring; in particular, $\operatorname{Spec} A$ is a Noetherian scheme if and only if A is a Noetherian ring. For a locally Noetherian scheme X, the local rings $\mathcal{O}_{X, x}$ are also Noetherian rings.

A Noetherian scheme is a Noetherian topological space. But the converse is false in general; consider, for example, the spectrum of a non-Noetherian valuation ring.

The definitions extend to formal schemes.

== Properties and Noetherian hypotheses ==
Having a (locally) Noetherian hypothesis for a statement about schemes generally makes a lot of problems more accessible because they sufficiently rigidify many of its properties.

Any Noetherian scheme can only have finitely many irreducible components.

Every morphism from a Noetherian scheme $X \to S$ is quasi-compact.

=== Dévissage ===
One of the most important structure theorems about Noetherian rings and Noetherian schemes is the dévissage theorem. This makes it possible to decompose arguments about coherent sheaves into inductive arguments. Given a short exact sequence of coherent sheaves

$0 \to \mathcal{E}' \to \mathcal{E} \to \mathcal{E}'' \to 0,$

proving one of the sheaves has some property is equivalent to proving the other two have the property. In particular, given a fixed coherent sheaf $\mathcal{F}$ and a sub-coherent sheaf $\mathcal{F}'$, showing $\mathcal{F}$ has some property can be reduced to looking at $\mathcal{F}'$ and $\mathcal{F}/\mathcal{F}'$. Since this process can only be non-trivially applied only a finite number of times, this makes many induction arguments possible.

=== Homological properties ===
There are many nice homological properties of Noetherian schemes.

==== Čech and sheaf cohomology ====
Čech cohomology and sheaf cohomology agree on an affine open cover. This makes it possible to compute the sheaf cohomology of $\mathbb{P}^n_S$ using Čech cohomology for the standard open cover.

==== Compatibility of colimits with cohomology ====
Given a direct system $\{ \mathcal{F}_\alpha, \phi_{\alpha\beta} \}_{\alpha \in \Lambda}$ of sheaves of abelian groups on a Noetherian scheme, there is a canonical isomorphism

$\varinjlim H^i(X,\mathcal{F}_\alpha) \to H^i(X, \varinjlim \mathcal{F}_\alpha)$

meaning the functors

$H^i(X,-): \text{Ab}(X) \to \text{Ab}$

preserve direct limits and coproducts.

==== Derived direct image ====
Given a locally finite type morphism $f:X \to S$ to a Noetherian scheme $S$ and a complex of sheaves $\mathcal{E}^\bullet \in D^b_{Coh}(X)$ with bounded coherent cohomology such that the sheaves $H^i(\mathcal{E}^\bullet)$ have proper support over $S$, then the derived pushforward $\mathbf{R}f_*(\mathcal{E}^\bullet)$ has bounded coherent cohomology over $S$, meaning it is an object in $D^b_{Coh}(S)$.

== Examples ==
Most schemes of interest are Noetherian schemes.

=== Locally of finite type over a Noetherian base ===
Another class of examples of Noetherian schemes are families of schemes $X \to S$ where the base $S$ is Noetherian and $X$ is of finite type over $S$. This includes many examples, such as the connected components of a Hilbert scheme, i.e. with a fixed Hilbert polynomial. This is important because it implies many moduli spaces encountered in the wild are Noetherian, such as the Moduli of algebraic curves and Moduli of stable vector bundles. Also, this property can be used to show many schemes considered in algebraic geometry are in fact Noetherian.

=== Quasi-projective varieties ===
In particular, quasi-projective varieties are Noetherian schemes. This class includes algebraic curves, elliptic curves, abelian varieties, Calabi-Yau schemes, Shimura varieties, K3 surfaces, and cubic surfaces. Basically all of the objects from classical algebraic geometry fit into this class of examples.

=== Infinitesimal deformations of Noetherian schemes ===
In particular, infinitesimal deformations of Noetherian schemes are again Noetherian. For example, given a curve $C / \text{Spec}(\mathbb{F}_q)$, any deformation $\mathcal{C}/\text{Spec}(\mathbb{F}_{q}[\varepsilon]/(\varepsilon^n))$ is also a Noetherian scheme. A tower of such deformations can be used to construct formal Noetherian schemes.

=== Non-examples ===
==== Schemes over Adelic bases ====
One of the natural rings which are non-Noetherian are the ring of adeles $\mathbb{A}_K$ for an algebraic number field $K$. In order to deal with such rings, a topology is considered, giving topological rings. There is a notion of algebraic geometry over such rings developed by André Weil and Alexander Grothendieck.

==== Rings of integers over infinite extensions ====
Given an infinite Galois field extension $K/L$, such as $\mathbb{Q}(\zeta_\infty)/\mathbb{Q}$ (by adjoining all roots of unity), the ring of integers $\mathcal{O}_K$ is a non-Noetherian ring which is dimension $1$. This breaks the intuition that finite dimensional schemes are necessarily Noetherian. Also, this example provides motivation for why studying schemes over a non-Noetherian base; that is, schemes $\text{Sch}/\text{Spec}(\mathcal{O}_E)$, can be an interesting and fruitful subject.

One special case^{pg 93} of such an extension is taking the maximal unramified extension $K^{ur}/K$ and considering the ring of integers $\mathcal{O}_{K^{ur}}$. The induced morphism

$\text{Spec}(\mathcal{O}_{K^{ur}}) \to \text{Spec}(\mathcal{O}_K)$

forms the universal covering of $\text{Spec}(\mathcal{O}_K)$.

==== Polynomial ring with infinitely many generators ====
Another example of a non-Noetherian finite-dimensional scheme (in fact zero-dimensional) is given by the following quotient of a polynomial ring with infinitely many generators.

$\frac{\mathbb{Q}[x_1,x_2,x_3,\ldots]}{(x_1,x_2^2,x_3^3,\ldots)}$

== See also ==
- Excellent ring - slightly more rigid than Noetherian rings, but with better properties
- Chevalley's theorem on constructible sets
- Zariski's main theorem
- Dualizing complex
- Nagata's compactification theorem
