= Bazaine =

Bazaine is a surname. Notable people with the surname include:

- Adolphe Bazaine-Vasseur (1809–1893), French railway engineer
- François Achille Bazaine (1811–1888), French military officer
- George Albert Bazaine-Hayter (1843–1914), French military officer
- Jean René Bazaine (1904–2001), French painter, designer of stained glass windows, and writer
- Pierre-Dominique Bazaine (1786–1838), French mathematician and military engineer
