= Battle of Saarbrücken =

Part of the Franco-Prussian War (1870)

Coordinates: 49°14′N 7°0′E

Occupation of Saarbrücken
- Part of the Franco-Prussian War
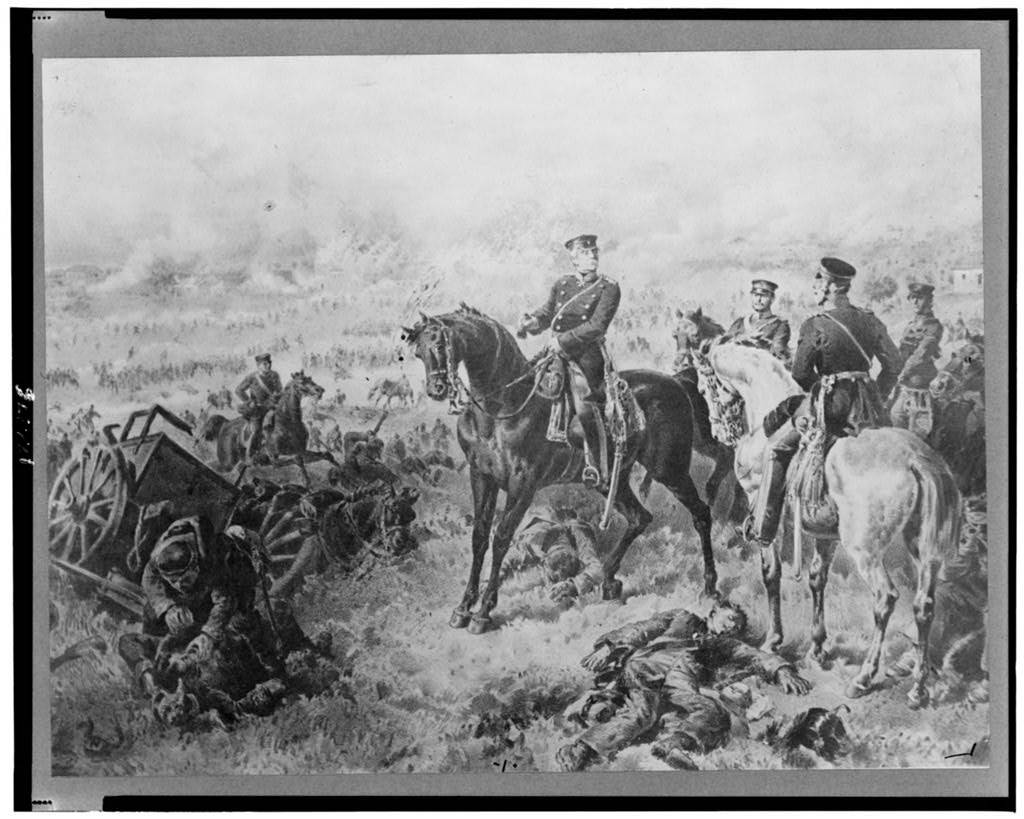
Date	2 August 1870
Location	Saarbrücken, Rhine Province, Prussia (Modern Day Saarland, Germany)
Result	French victory

Belligerents
(Second French Empire) France	North German Confederation: Prussia

Commanders and leaders
Charles Frossard; François Bazaine; Napoleon III	Eduard von Pestel

Units involved
French II and III Corps	Prussian 40th Regiment

Strength
30,000	1,400 Infantry

Casualties and losses
83	86 – 88 Infantry
- Location of Saarbrücken within Germany

The Battle of Saarbrücken was the first major engagement between the French Empire and the Kingdom of Prussia during the Franco-Prussian War. The battle took place on 2 August 1870, around the city of Saarbrücken.

== Background ==
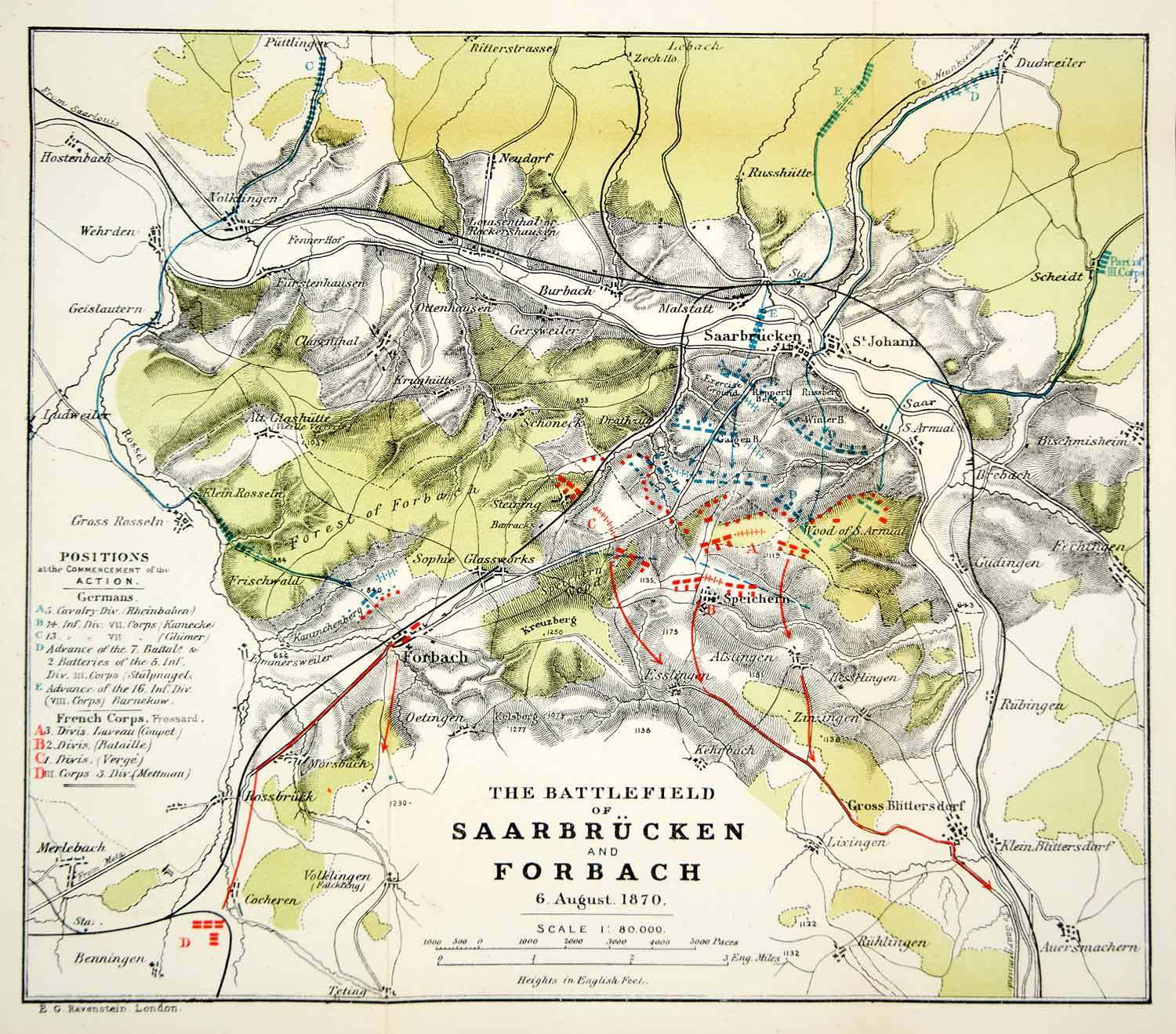

During this time, the Prussians along with several other German states were rapidly mobilizing as a contrast to French expectations, only a small token force of the French Army was dedicated to launching offensives towards the southern German states as the French did not expect the Prussians to mobilize quickly. Moreover, Napoleon III who had assumed command of the new Army of the Rhine which consisted of almost 100,000 men was pressured by many to launch an offensive against the North German Confederation. He ordered the Army of the Rhine to cross the Saar River and to seize Saarbrücken.

== Battle ==
The II and III Corps led by General Charles Frossard and Marshal François Bazaine managed to cross the Saar River by 2 August 1870, they encountered small Prussian detachments at the outskirts of the town but was not delayed in their attempts to seize the garrison. Major fighting eventually broke out later that day, the 40th Prussian Regiment of the 16th Infantry Division was quickly forced out of the town as the French, with their numerical superiority along with the much more accurate and reliable Chassepot Rifle outmatched the Prussian defenders. By the end of the day, French casualty reports estimate that they had 10 killed, wounded, or missing including one officer, though some estimates could go as high as 86 casualties. The Prussians on the other hand had around 76-83 killed, wounded, or missing. After the battle, Napoleon III wrote a telegram to his wife, Empress Eugénie de Montijo which read:

"Louis has received his baptism of fire; he was admirably cool and a little impressed. A division of Fossard's command carried the heights overlooking the Saar. Louis and I were in the front, where the bullets fell about us. Louis keeps a ball he picked up on the battlefield. The soldiers are delighted at his tranquility. We lost one officer and ten men." - Napoleon

== Aftermath ==
The battle was by no means a deciding factor of the war. The French seizure of Saarbrücken nonetheless proved the reliability and accuracy of the Chassepot Rifle compared to its Dreyse counterparts which would later contribute to Germany's heavy casualties during the early months of the war. The battle however would be one of France's few successes during the war, as only two days later, German forces attacked the border town of Wissembourg. The subsequent French defeat during the Battle of Wissembourg (1870) forced them to retreat from Saarbrucken and focus on defending the homeland.
