= Clapeyron's theorem =

In the linear theory of elasticity Clapeyron's theorem states that the potential energy of deformation of a body, which is in equilibrium under a given load, is equal to half the work done by the external forces computed assuming these forces had remained constant from the initial state to the final state.

It is named after the French scientist Émile Clapeyron.

For example, consider a linear spring with initial length L_{0} and gradually pull on the spring until it reaches equilibrium at a length L_{1} when the pulling force is F. By the theorem, the potential energy of deformation in the spring is given by:

$$\frac{1}{2}F (L_1 - L_0).$$

The actual force increased from 0 to F during the deformation; the work done can be computed by integration in distance. Clapeyron's equation, which uses the final force only, may be puzzling at first, but is nevertheless true because it includes a corrective factor of one half.

Another theorem, the theorem of three moments used in bridge engineering is also sometimes called Clapeyron's theorem.
