= Émile Clapeyron =

French engineer and physicist (1799–1864)

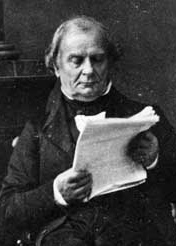
- Born: 26 January 1799; Paris, France
- Died: 28 January 1864 (aged 65); Paris, France
- Known for: Second law of thermodynamics Ideal gas law Clapeyron's theorem Clapeyron's theorem of three moments Clapeyron equation Clausius-Clapeyron relation
- Scientific career
- Fields: Physics

Benoît Paul Émile Clapeyron (French: [klapɛʁɔ̃]; 26 January 1799 – 28 January 1864) was a French engineer and physicist, one of the founders of thermodynamics. He is known for developing the ideal gas law.

== Life ==
Born in Paris, Clapeyron studied at the École polytechnique, graduating in 1818. He also studied at École des mines. In 1820 he and Gabriel Lamé went to Saint Petersburg to teach and work at the school of public works there. He returned to Paris only after the Revolution of July 1830, supervising the construction of the first railway lines connecting Paris to Versailles and Paris to Saint-Germain. The half brothers Stéphane Mony and Eugène Flachat collaborated in this project, which was financed by Adolphe d'Eichthal^{(fr)}, Rothschild, Auguste Thurneyssen, Sanson Davillier and the Péreire brothers. Clapeyron took his steam engine designs to England in 1836 to find a manufacturer and engaged Sharp, Roberts and Co.

From 1844 to 1859 Clapeyron was a professor at École des Ponts et Chaussées.

Clapeyron married Mélanie Bazaine, daughter of Pierre-Dominique Bazaine (mathematician and ingénieur des ponts), and older sister of Pierre-Dominique (Adolphe) Bazaine (railway engineer) and François Achille Bazaine (Marshal of France).

== Work ==
In 1834, he made his first contribution to the creation of modern thermodynamics by publishing a report entitled Mémoire sur la puissance motrice de la chaleur (Memoir on the Motive Power of Heat), in which he developed the work of the physicist Nicolas Léonard Sadi Carnot, deceased two years before. Though Carnot had developed a compelling analysis of a generalised heat engine, he had employed the clumsy and already unfashionable caloric theory.

Clapeyron, in his memoire, presented Carnot's work in a more accessible and analytic graphical form, showing the Carnot cycle as a closed curve on an indicator diagram, a chart of pressure against volume (named in his honor Clapeyron's graph). Clapeyron's analysis of Carnot was more broadly disseminated in 1843 when Johann Poggendorff translated it into German.

In 1842 Clapeyron published his findings on the "optimal position for the piston at which the various valves should be opened or closed." In 1843, Clapeyron further developed the idea of a reversible process, already suggested by Carnot and made a definitive statement of Carnot's principle, what is now known as the second law of thermodynamics.

These foundations enabled him to make substantive extensions of Clausius' work, including the formula, now known as the Clausius–Clapeyron relation, which characterises the phase transition between two phases of matter. He further considered questions of phase transitions in what later became known as Stefan problems.

Clapeyron also worked on the characterisation of perfect gases, the equilibrium of homogeneous solids, and calculations of the statics of continuous beams, notably the theorem of three moments (Clapeyron's theorem).

== Honors ==
- Member of the Académie des Sciences, (1858).
- The Rue Clapeyron in Paris' 8th arrondissement (here) is named for him.
- His name is one of the 72 names inscribed on the Eiffel Tower.

== Publications ==
- Clapeyron, E. (1834). "Mémoire sur la Puissance Motrice de la Chaleur". Journal de l'École Royale Polytechnique (in French). Vingt-troisième cahier, Tome XIV. Paris: De l'Imprimerie Royale: 153–190.
- Clapeyron, E. (1837). Taylor, Richard (ed.). "Memoir on the Motive Power of Heat" . Scientific Memoirs. 1: 347 – via Wikisource. [scan ] (source: The Internet Archive)
