= Louis Hillairaud =

Harness maker, traveling salesman (1849–1936

Louis Joachim Hillairaud
- Born: November 30, 1849; La Rochelle, France
- Died: March 16, 1936 (aged 86); La Rochelle, France

Louis Hillairaud (30 November 1849 – 16 March 1936) was a harness maker and a traveling salesman. He became known for attempting to assassinate the former Marshal François Achille Bazaine.

== Biography ==
The son of Louis Félix Hillairaud, a harness maker, and Catherine Narquet, his wife, Louis Hillairaud was born in La Rochelle in 1849.

Becoming a traveling leather salesman, while passing through Paris in 1870, during the Franco-Prussian War, he volunteered to defend the capital. However, the surrender of Marshal Marshal Bazaine, who was entrenched in the fortress of Metz, deeply affected him. Hillairaud, like many Frenchmen, held him responsible for France's defeat. He then swore to avenge the honor of the country by killing Bazaine. This obsession took 17 years to come to fruition: on his 3rd visit to Spain, he finally found the former marshal, who had taken refuge in Madrid after his escape. On 17 April 1887, he attempted to assassinate him with a knife, but only managed to wound him severely, though not fatally. François Bazaine died the following year from a cerebral hemorrhage.

During his trial in Spain, doctors judged Hillairaud to be suffering from patriotic delirium, but this did not prevent him from being sentenced to eight years of penal servitude. However, he served only six years in prison, as he was released under a general amnesty decided on the occasion of 400 years since Columbus's discovery of the America, thanks to the intervention of Grand Duke Vladimir Alexandrovich of Russia with the Spanish Regent Maria Christina, after he visited Hillairaud's prison.

Returning to La Rochelle, Louis Hillairaud reopened a harness making shop. His past earned him the nickname "Bazaine" by the town's inhabitants. He published his memoirs in 1910. In 1914, at the beginning of World War I, he decided to enlist, at the age of 64, in the 14th Infantry Regiment. After being discharged, he published the continuation of his memoirs.

He died in 1936 at Saint-Louis Hospital in La Rochelle. His death was announced in the press on 17 March 1936.

== Works ==
- My Memories. Homeland, Love, and Fate [Followed by various pieces], La Rochelle, L. Texier Printing, 1910
- On the Occasion of the 1870-71 Combatants' Banquet. War!... [La Rochelle, 8 April 1923].
- Religion and Spiritism, Philosophy [Followed by: Rodin's Maneuvers, Loyola Still Honors Me with His Hatred].
- To the Seventy-Five [*** To Paul Déroulède, In Memory of Miss Cavell, England's Response].
- 1923-1924. New Thoughts. Famous Trials by D. Ramon Sanchez de Ocaña,... L. Hillairaud's Trial, introduction, translated from Spanish by L. Hillairaud.

== Bibliography ==
- Bernard Morasin, The Rochelais Who Wanted to Kill Bazaine, Bordessoules Editions, 2005
