= Pierre-Dominique Bazaine =

Russian mathematician

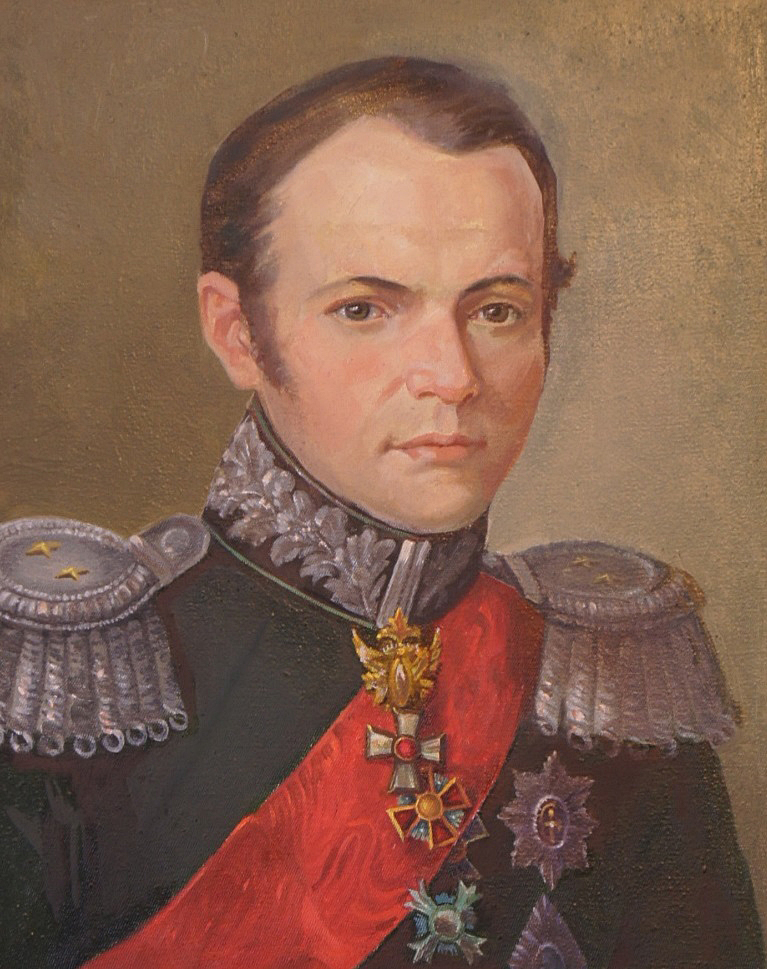
- Lt Gen Pierre-Dominique Bazaine (1786-1838)
- Born: 13 January 1786; Scy, France
- Died: 29 September 1838 (aged 52); Paris, France
- Citizenship: France
- Education: École Polytechnique
- Known for: Canals, bridges and flood defences in St.Petersburg, Russia, esp First Engineer Bridge which was named after him
- Awards: Order of St.Vladimir; Grand Cross of Order of St. Alexander Nevsky; Legion of Honour - Commander; Prussian Order of the Red Eagle (1st Class); Polish Order of the White Eagle; Honorary fellow of St Petersburg Academy; Honorary Fellow or Foreign Member of the Science Academies of Turin, Munich, Stockholm and St Petersburg.
- Scientific career
- Fields: Mathematician and engineer
- Workplaces: French Army

Notes
- His elder son Pierre-Dominique was also a Civil Engineer and his younger son Achille became a Marshal of France.

Pierre-Dominique Bazaine (Пётр Петрович Базен) (1786–1838) was a French scientist and engineer.

== Early life ==
He was born 13 January 1786, in the town of Scy-sur-Moselle, son of Pierre Bazaine (1760-1832) and Francoise Gilbert. Educated in Paris, graduate of the Paris engineering schools, Paris' Polytechnic University ("Ecole polytechnique") and Paris' University of Bridges ("Ecole des ponts"). Initially he practised as an Engineer in Italy and Southern France.

== Military career ==
His outstanding abilities drew the attention of Napoleon I, who subsequently recommended him to the Russian Emperor Czar Alexander I, along with engineers Fabrom, Destremom and Potier, to take up senior posts in the Russia corps of Civil Engineers. Bazaine arrived in Saint Petersburg, Russia, in 1810 with Lieutenant Fabrom, but due to war with France, did not immediately take up his post. Instead he was sent to Odessa under the governor-general of the Duke de Richelieu, where his first work was at the Russian port of Evpatoriya. He was then sent to Yaroslavl, to Poshehone and then in 1812, due to the war with France, he was deported to Eastern Siberia, where he spent more than two years.

In 1815, with the end of war in Europe, he returned to Saint Petersburg, where with the new rank of colonel, he was appointed chair professor of higher analytics and mechanics at the Civil Engineering Institute. In 1820, he was promoted to major-general and in 1823 he was appointed a member of the Council Ways and Communications, being made inspector-general. In 1828, Bazaine returned to France but on his return to Russia was promoted to lieutenant general on 1 April 1830.

== Structural engineering works ==
In January 1824, he became director of the Imperial Russian Academy of Sciences, Saint Petersburg, and also chairman of the Committee for Buildings and Hydraulic works in Saint Petersburg. Bazaine was responsible for many of the bridges of Saint Petersburg and its outskirts (including a number of the small and elegant lightweight iron bridges in the Summer Garden), as well as other major civil engineering projects, including flood protection. He received many honours and awards for his extensive contribution to the infrastructure of Russia, as well as honorary fellowship of a number of science academies across Europe for his ground-breaking mathematical theses.

Bazaine's structural engineering works were extensive and much remains in the historic infrastructure in Russia. His main works are:

- the Obvodny canal in St. Petersburg;
- water supply Yamskoy Slobody and Tavrichesky Garden;
- Shlisselbourg granite building locks (for which he was awarded the Order of White Eagle).

For the last buildings he wrote a remarkable treatise, in which he argued for the possibility of huge water savings in the Ladoga Canal, by ships passing through its locks: "Mémoire sur les bassins d'épargne" (napech. in Zapiskah Acad. Sciences). From 1820 to 1832 Bazaines prominent works include: rebuilding St. Isaac's Cathedral and on the same design building several other churches; the first chain bridge in Russia at Ekaterina park; restructuring, under his personal supervision, Ohtenskogo powder factory; deepening the river estuary at Neva and its channels; erection of buildings of the Senate and the Synod; rebuilding the University; the remarkable construction of the dome over the cathedral of St.Trinity (at the St. Petersburg side), 87 feet in diameter. Some of the bridges in St.Petersburg which he is responsible for include Demidov Bridge and First Engineer Bridge. He conceived the constructions of the floors of the Winter Palace, the Theater Alexandrinski and the Cathedral of the St.Trinidad. He directed the works of construction of the Obvodni channel, the buildings Senate and Synod of the sluices of Shlisselbourg, of the hydraulic constructions of the Okhtinski factory. He also masterminded the first project to protect St.Petersburg against flooding.

At the request of Alexander I of Russia he was sent to Russia by Napoleon I as an army officer in the engineering corps to set up an institute for the education of transportation engineers, and in 1824 he became its director. Bazaine remained in Russia until 1834, organizing transportation routes and directing the work of inland navigation.

== Works ==
Bazaine devoted himself entirely to science and analytics whilst in Siberia, writing his great treatise on differential calculus and several memoirs about plane geometry and properties of various lengths in three dimensions. Bazaine wrote several treaties on mathematics, transportation and the civil genius including a monograph on steamboats and their use in navigating canals and rivers.

- "The initial basis of differential calculus" (First French edition 1817 and Russian 1819)
- "The initial basis of integral calculus" (First French edition 1825 and Russian 1827)
- "The Proof of the beginning of the speculative speeds, considered as the basis of mechanics" (translated by Zavadsky, 1832)
- "Mémoire sur l'état actuel du système de Vychni-Volotchok, ou de la principale communication artificielle établie entre la mer Caspienne et la Baltique"
- "Mémoire sur la théorie du mouvement des barques à vapeur et sur leur application à la navigation des canaux, des fleuves et des rivières", St Petersburg 1817
- "Mémoire sur l'impossibilité de ramener par un simple approfondissement le niveau du canal de Ladoga, à la même hauteur, que celui du lac du même nom"
- "Notice sur un nouvel artifice propre à diminuer la dépense d'eau des canaux en général et sur un nouveau système de petite navigation"
- "Mémoires sur les méthodes de raccordement à employer pour les alignements des routes"
- "Notice sur la construction des paratonnerres"
- "Notice sur un nouvel appareil gazogène"
- "Mémoire sur la construction des Chaussées, et sur la détermination des distances moyennes pour le transport des matériaux"
- "Introduction à l'étude de la statique synthétique, à l'usage des élèves de l'institut des voies de communications"
- "Démonstration du principe des vitesses virtuelles, considéré comme base de la mecanique"
- "Notices sur la composition des reliefs"
- "Memoire sur un nouveau système relatif à l'établissement d'un chantier général destiné à la construction, au radoub et à la conservation des vaisseaux"
- "Mémoire sur les machines à vapeurs en général"
- "Mémoire sur la détermination de la force expansive de la vapeur, et des avantages qu'on en peut retirer sous le rapport industriel"
- "Mémoire sur les moyens de preserver les machines à vapeur des exploisions auxquelles elles sont exposées "
- "Mémoire sur la fabrication, et en particulier sur le séchage de la poudre à canon"

== Awards ==
He was made a member of the Mineralogical Society of St. Petersburg University in 1834.

By decree on 1 May 1821, Bazaine was awarded a Knight in France's Legion of Honour. By decree on 24 July 1826, the rank of Bazaine's Legion of Honour award was promoted to Officer. The rank of this award was later promoted to commander.

Bazaine received awards for a number of his constructions. In addition to the above, he was awarded the Order of St.Vladimir, the Grand Cross of St. Alexander Nevsky, and the Prussian Order of the Red Eagle (1st Class). In 1828, he was elected as an honorary fellow of St Petersburg Academy of Sciences and as an honorary fellow of the Science Academies of Turin, Munich, Stockholm and St Petersburg.

== Family ==
He married Marie-Madeleine Vasseur and they had 3 children, 2 sons and a daughter. His daughter Melanie (1808-1852) married the engineer Benoît Paul Émile Clapeyron in 1834. His eldest son, also Pierre-Dominique Bazaine (known as Adolphe) (1809-1893) was also a Civil Engineer and an important Railway engineer in the 1840s. He married an English woman Elizabeth Hayter, elder daughter of the English Court Painter Sir George Hayter. His second son was Francois Achille Bazaine, a distinguished soldier who became a Marshal of France. He abandoned his family just prior to the birth of Achille, leaving it without financial support.

== Death ==
Deteriorating health prompted Bazaine to resign, and in 1834 he was transferred to the corps of military engineers, but heart disease forced Bazaine to return to Paris where he died on 28 September 1838 at his Paris home (9 Neuve des Capucines Street). He was buried in Montmartre Cemetery.

== Sources ==
- "Zhurn. Glavn. Upravl. Paths Messaging. And Publicity. Buildings", in 1858, so HH VIII.

== See also ==
- Legion of Honour
- Legion of Honour Museum
- List of Legion of Honour recipients by name (B)
- Ribbons of the French military and civil awards
- War Cross (France)
