= Eduard von Pestel =

Prussian military officer and German general

Generalleutnant Eduard von Pestel
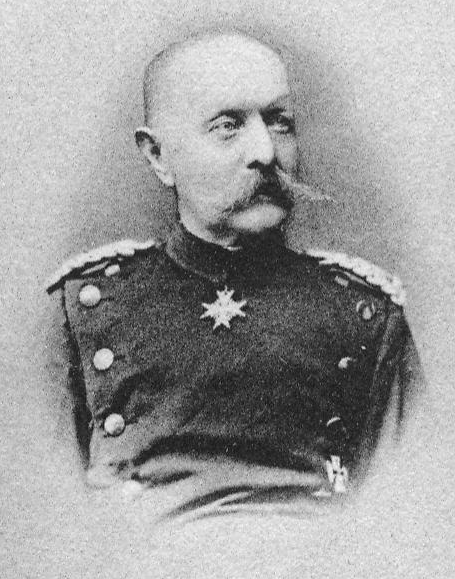
- Born: 18 May 1821; Münster, Prussia
- Died: 24 March 1908 (aged 86); Wiesbaden, Germany
- Burial place: Ehrental Cemetery, Saarbrücken, Germany
- Spouse: Julie Eichhorn
- Military career
- Allegiance: Kingdom of Prussia; German Empire
- Branch: Prussian Army; Imperial German Army
- Service years: 1838 – ?
- Rank: Generalleutnant
- Nickname: Hero of Saarbrücken
- Commands: 7th Uhlan Regiment
- Conflicts: Second Schleswig War; Austro-Prussian War; Franco-Prussian War; Battle of Saarbrücken; Siege of Metz; Battle of Amiens
- Awards: Pour le Mérite

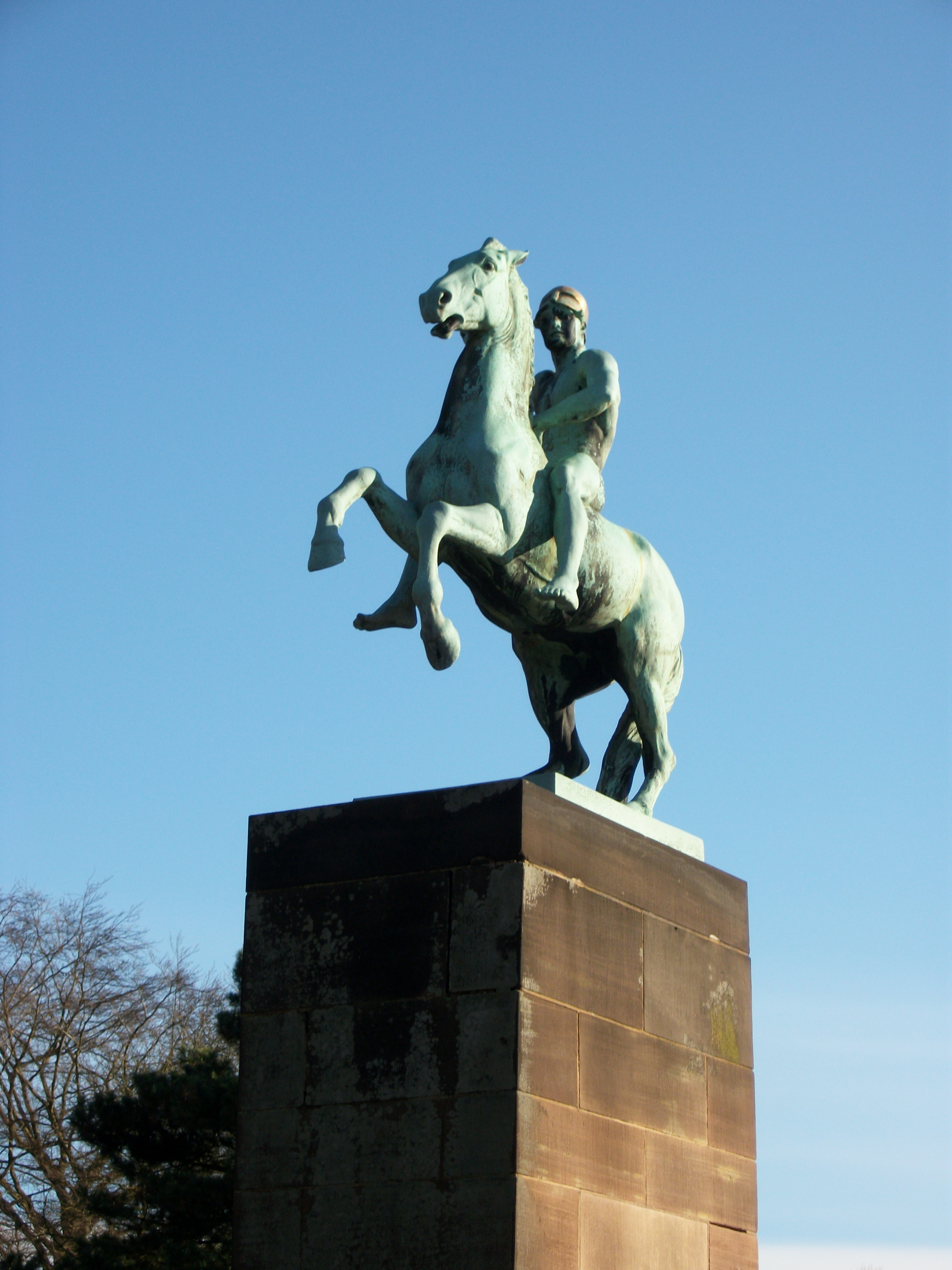
Uhlan memorial in Saarbrücken′s Staden recreational area.

Eduard von Pestel (18 May 1821 – 24 March 1908) was a Prussian generalleutnant. He is best known for his defense of Saarbrücken and Sankt Johann before and during the Battle of Saarbrücken on 2 August 1870, the first major engagement of the Franco-Prussian War. Regarded as a war hero by the local population, he was made an honorary citizen of Saarbrücken and Sankt Johann.

== Biography ==
=== Ancestry ===
Pestel was born at Münster on 18 May 1821, a grandson of the Prussian Chamber Councillor Christoph Heinrich von Pestel (1736–1794), whose appointment as director of the County of Mark′s War and Domain Chamber in 1787 elevated the family to the status of nobility. Eduard von Pestel′s father was the government councilor Georg von Pestel (1783–1846), and his mother was Sabine Melusine Wilhelmine Magdalene Christiane, born Countess of Hardenberg (1781–1850).

=== Military career ===
After joining the Prussian Army as an officer candidate, Pestel first passed the Portepee Ensign examination. He joined the 11th Hussar Regiment as an ensign in 1838. In 1849 he participed in the Second Schleswig War. He was promoted to rittmeister in 1856. In 1866 he took part in the Austro-Prussian War and became a staff officer in the 7th Westphalian Dragoon Regiment. In 1869 he took command of the 7th Uhlan Regiment.

The 7th Uhlan Regiment was stationed in Saarbrücken at the beginning of the Franco-Prussian War on 19 July 1870. A week later, on 26 July 1870, Pestel was promoted from major to Oberstleutnant (lieutenant colonel). In overall command of a combined force only 900 men of his regiment and the 40th Regiment of the Prussian 16th Division and without artillery support, he succeeded with the active participation of the city population in presenting the appearance of a secure defensive position that discouraged his 20,000-strong French opponent from attempting to take Saarbrücken for 14 days. After the French did take the city on 2 August 1870, they quickly retreated, sparing the civilian population from pillage. Pestel gained local fame for his defense of Saarbrücken and was given the popular title "Hero of Saarbrücken". As a thank you, he was made an honorary citizen of Saarbrücken in 1896.

On 6 September 1870, Pestel and his 7th Uhlan Regiment redeployed to Metz to take part in the ongoing Siege of Metz. On 27 November 1870, he participated in the Battle of Amiens near Amiens, France, seeing action near Longpré-les-Corps-Saints. The Franco-Prussian War ended in January 1871.

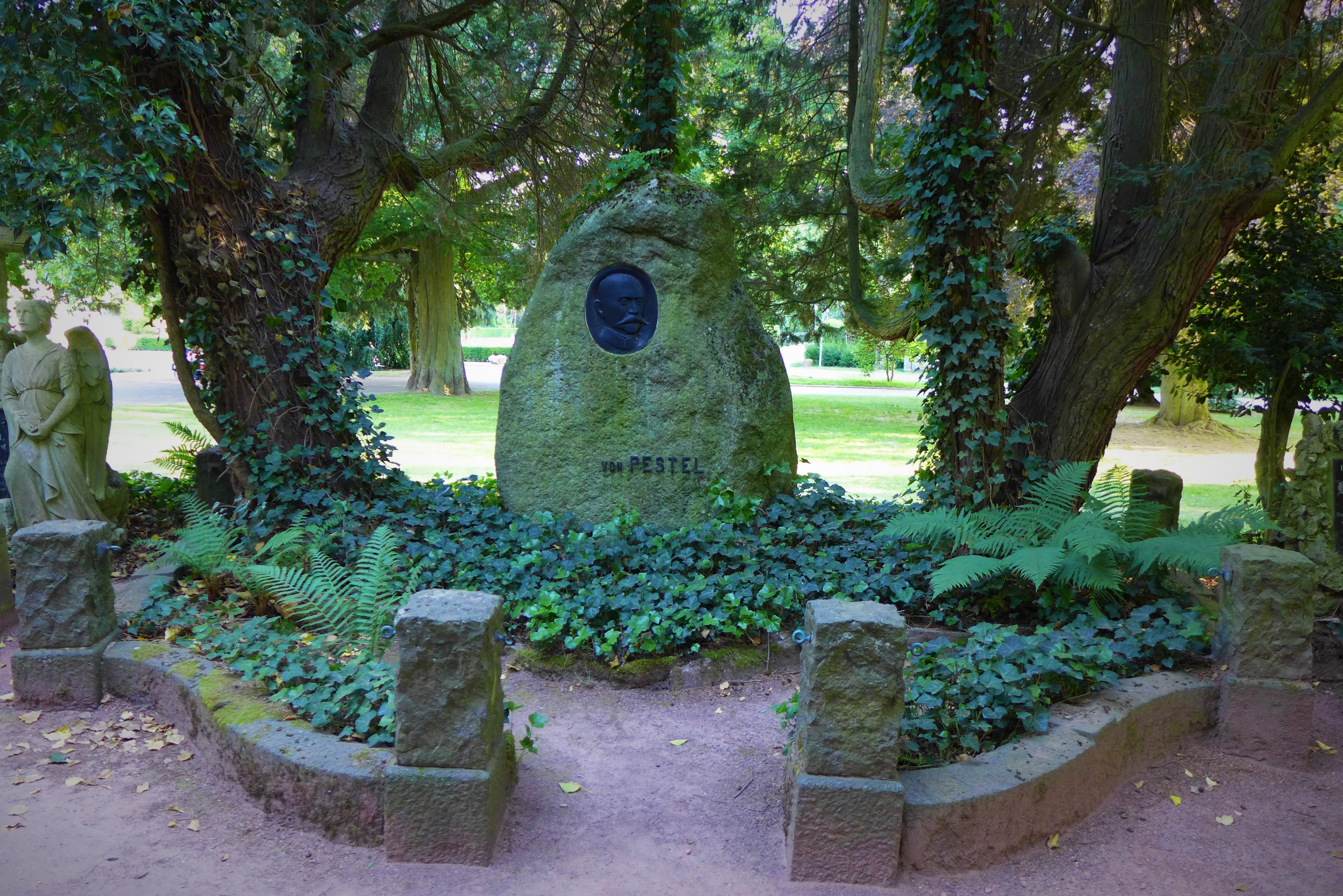
Pestel′s grave in the Ehrental Cemetery in the German-French Garden in Saarbrücken, Germany.

Pestel received a promotion to oberst (colonel) on 18 August 1871. In 1874 he relinquished command of the 7th Uhlan Regiment and was transferred to Wiesbaden. After completing his tour of duty there, he retired and was placed on the reserve list. While retired in reserve, he was promoted to generalleutnant (lieutenant general) in 1890.

=== Personal life ===
Von Pestel married Julie Eichhorn in July 1862. The couple had a son and three daughters. He was a member of the Düsseldorf Masonic Lodge "Zu den drei Verbündeten" ("To the three allies").

=== Death ===
Von Pestel died at Wiesbaden on 24 March 1908. His grave is in the Ehrental military cemetery in Saarbrücken, today part of the German-French Garden.

== Awards and honors ==
- Iron Cross Second Class (6 September 1870)
- Iron Cross First Class (28 December 1870)
- Knight's Cross of the Military Karl-Friedrich Merit Order (28 December 1870)
- Commander's Cross Second Class of the Order of the Zähringer Lion with Swords (18 August 1871)
- Pour le Mérite (19 January 1873)
- Appointed honorary citizen of the cities of Saarbrücken and Sankt Johann (24 September 1896)

== Commemoration ==
A portrait monument to Pestel was unveiled in Saarbrücken's Ehrental cemetery on 25 March 1910.

The Pestelstrasse (Pestel Street) in Saarbrücken's Alt-Saarbrücken district was named after Pestel.

Großherzog-Friedrich-Straße (Archduke Frederick Street), located in the Sankt Johann district of Saarbrücken, was named after Archduke Frederick, the namesake of the 7th Uhlan Regiment, which Pestel commanded in the Battle of Saarbrücken.
