= François Achille Bazaine =

French marshal (1811–1884)

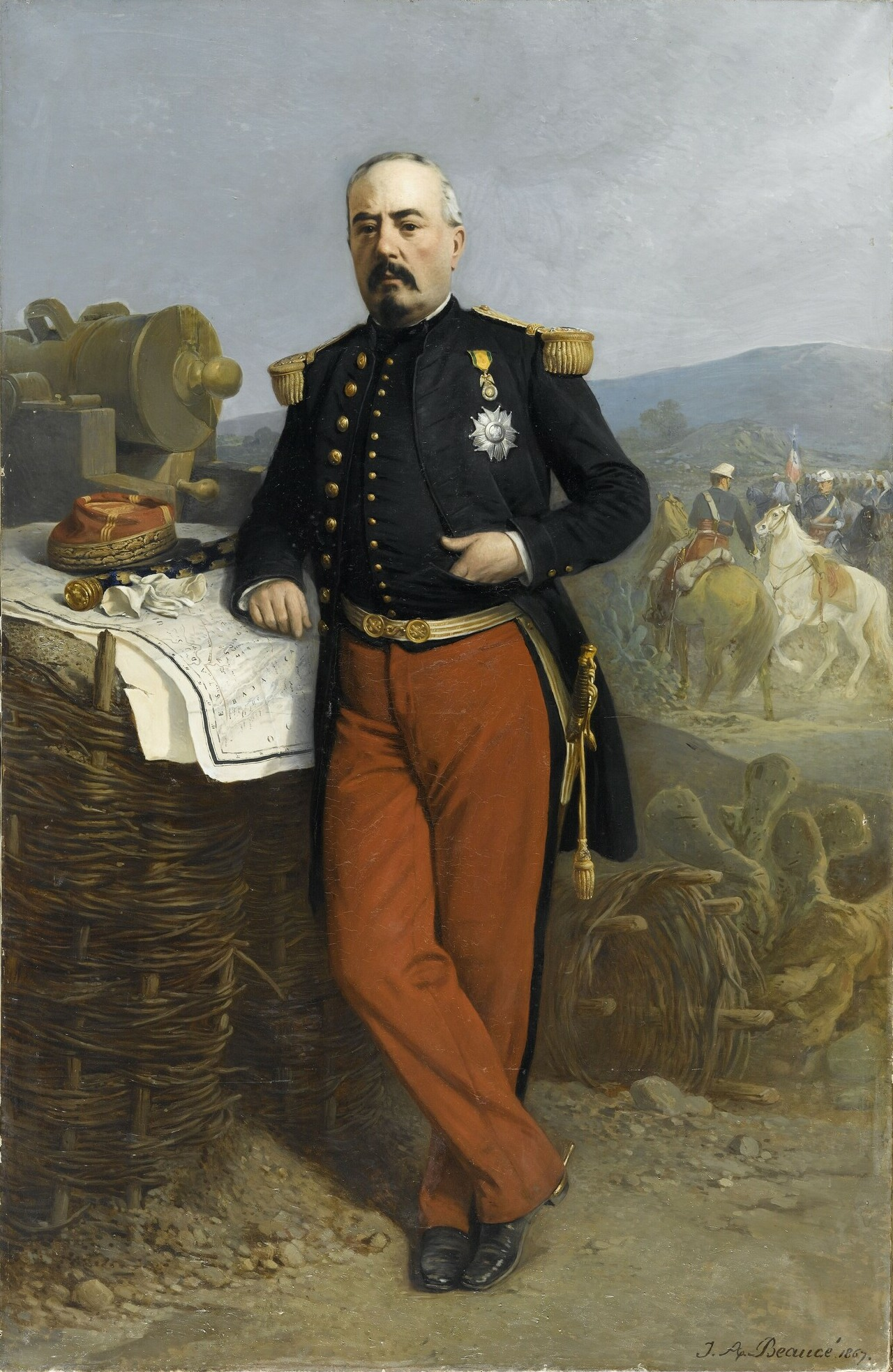
- François Achille Bazaine on campaign in Mexico by Jean-Adolphe Beauce
- Born: 13 February 1811; Versailles, Seine-et-Oise, France
- Died: 23 September 1888 (aged 77); Madrid, Spain
- Military career
- Allegiance: July Monarchy; French Second Republic; Second French Empire
- Branch: French Army
- Service years: 1831–1873
- Rank: Marshal of France (Dignity of the State)
- Nickname: Achille
- Commands: Governor of Tlemcen, Algeria 1848; 1st Regiment, 1st Foreign Legion; 1^{er} R.E.L.E 1851; Foreign Legion Brigade (1st & 2nd Foreign), Crimea; 1854; Governor of Sevastopol; 1855; Army Inspector General; 1857; French Forces in Mexico; 1864; Commander-in-Chief Imperial Guard; Paris 1867; III Army Corps, Army of the Rhine 1870; Commander-in-Chief French Forces, Franco-Prussian War; 1870
- Conflicts: First Carlist War; Crimean War; Franco-Austrian War; French Intervention in Mexico; Franco-Prussian War; Siege of Metz (1870) (surrendered)
- Awards: Grand Cross of the Legion of Honour (1863); Médaille Militaire; Grand Cordon of the Order of Léopold of the Belgians; Companion of the Order of the Bath
- Other work: Senator of the Second French Empire (appointed 1864)

François Achille Bazaine (French pronunciation: [frɑ̃swa aʃil bazɛn]; 13 February 1811 – 23 September 1888) was an officer of the French army. Bazaine rose through the ranks over four decades of distinguished service (including 35 years on campaign) under Louis Philippe and then Napoleon III, having held every rank in the army from fusilier to Marshal of France, the latter in 1863. Under the Second Empire, he was made a senator.

== Early life ==
Bazaine came from a family established in Scy-Chazelles, near Metz. His grandfather was a winemaker who, after the revolution, moved to Paris and eventually became known as a mathematician. Bazaine’s father, Dominique was an engineer; after graduation from the École polytechnique, he moved to Russia to establish the Institute of Engineers for Roads and Communications. He became a Russian lieutenant general, and was imprisoned in Siberia during the campaigns of Napoleon I. After the fall of the empire, he regained his rank and returned to France in 1835.

Beginning in 1807 Dominique Bazaine had been in a relationship with Marie-Madeleine Vasseur, known as 'Melanie', a Versailles haberdasher. While Dominique hid the relationship from his family, the couple had three illegitimate children: Pierre-Dominique Bazaine, who became a renowned engineer, and Mélanie Bazaine, who went on to marry the engineer Émile Clapeyron.

François Achille Bazaine, the youngest child, was born at Versailles on 13 February 1811. He studied at the Lycée Saint-Louis but was unsuccessful at gaining admission to the École polytechnique. In 1831, he enlisted as a private on 28 March 1831 at the 37th Infantry Division at Auxonne, and was promoted to Caporal (Corporal) on 8 July 1831. He was promoted to Corporal Fourrier on 13 January 1832 and, in July 1832, to Sergent (Sergeant) Fourrier (fourrier: a non-commissioned officer in charge of preceding the troops).

== French Foreign Legion and Algeria ==
Bazaine entered the French Foreign Legion in August 1832. He was designated as Sergent-Major, on 4 November, he attained the Epaulette on 2 November 1833. On 22 July 1835, he was wounded in the battle of Macta against Abd al-Qadir. He was promoted to Lieutenant and made a knight of France's Legion of Honour.

With the Legion, he was ceded by Louis Philippe I to Queen Christine to combat the Carlists. Named Spanish Captain, he commanded a company of voltigeurs and was then attached to the general staff headquarters of Colonel Conrad. He was cited at the battles of Ponts (1835), Lamanère (1836), Huesca (1837) and Barbastro (1837) where, despite being wounded in the leg, he dragged the wounded Colonel Conrad to safety. He was then attached to Colonel Cariès de Senilhes, commissioner of the French government to the Army of Spain.

In 1838, he joined the 4th Light Infantry with his French rank of Lieutenant. On 20 October 1839, he was re-promoted to Captain in the Legion in Algeria. In 1840, he passed to the 8th Chasseurs à Pied Battalion. He took in part in the expeditions in Miliana where he was cited, as well as in Kabylie and Morocco. Promoted to Commandant–Major on 10 March 1844, he was assigned to the 58th Line Infantry Regiment as the Arab Bureau Chief of Tlemcen. On 9 November 1845, he was promoted to the rank of Officer of the Legion of Honour,. Cited for the Battle of Sidi Brahim, on 24 March 1846, he passed to the 5th Foreign Infantry Regiment while still in charge of Arab relations. He was cited at the combats of Afir for his contribution to the submission of Abd al-Qadir. Promoted to Lieutenant-Colonel on 11 April 1848, he was assigned to the 19th Light Infantry Regiment then went back to the 5th Line Infantry Regiment on 30 August superior commander of Tlemcen. On 4 June 1850, he was designated as a colonel in the 55th Infantry Division (French: 55^{e} de ligne) and Director of the Arab Affairs division at Oran.

On 4 February 1851, he was placed at the head of the 1st Regiment of the 1st Foreign Legion 1^{er} R.E.L.E and. the next month, he commanded the subdivision of Sidi Bel Abbès, a post which he occupied until 1854.

== Crimea and Italy ==
On 28 October 1854, he was admitted to the 1st section of officer generals with the rank of Maréchal de camp and commanded two regiments of the Legion at the Army of the Orient. On 10 September 1855, he became the military commandant of Sevastopol and général de division on the next 22 September. During the Crimean War, he was wounded and cited during the attack of the Quarantaine, with a horse shot underneath him, the same day. On 16 August 1856, following the combat of Sidi Kafirhe, he was awarded a citation, and, by decree, his French Legion of Honour rank was upgraded to the rank of Commander. for the apprehension of the position of Kinbourn at the closing of Dniepr, which he concluded in three days.

The way in which he conducted the left wing of the French forces in the final Allied assault on Sebastopol on 8 September 1855 (wounded, shell fragment in left hip, his horse killed under him), received acclaim of the highest order from the Allied Command and he was subsequently promoted to Major General (General de Division) on 22 September 1855 and selected from all the Allied Generals to assume the Governorship of Sebastopol.

At 44, this made him the youngest General in the French Army. In October 1855, Bazaine was chosen to give the coup de grâce. With a mixed French and British Force, he sailed to Kinburn at the mouth of the Dnieper to attack the remaining Russian forces to the North of Sebastopol. He led a daring landing and seized the naval fortress with a frontal assault, an action for which he received particular praise: "General Bazaine who commands that portion of the French Army now operating at the mouth of the Dnieper may be cited as presenting one of the most brilliant examples of the achievement of military distinction in the modern day". At Sebastopol, on 25 June 1856 he was invested by the British Commander in Chief, Lord Gough, with the Order of the Bath, for his conspicuous contribution to the Allied campaign during the Crimean War.

Upon his return to France, he occupied the post of inspector of the infantry then commanded the 19th Infantry Division (French: 19^{e} Division Militaire) at Bourges.

Commander of the 3rd Infantry Division (French: 3^{e} Division d'Infanterie) of the 1st Army Corps of Achille Baraguey d'Hilliers, he was close to the combat line of Melegnano, on 8 June 1859, and the Battle of Solferino, on 24 June, during the conquest of the cemetery.

Actually, during that year in 1859, he commanded the Division in the Franco-Sardinian campaign against Austrian forces in Lombardy. He was wounded by a shell splinter in the head on 8 June, during the action at the Battle of Melegnano. He recovered to play a conspicuous part in the Solferino, which he captured on 24 June 1859, despite being wounded again (bullet to the upper thigh) and having his horse shot from under him again, earning another citation.

== Mexico ==
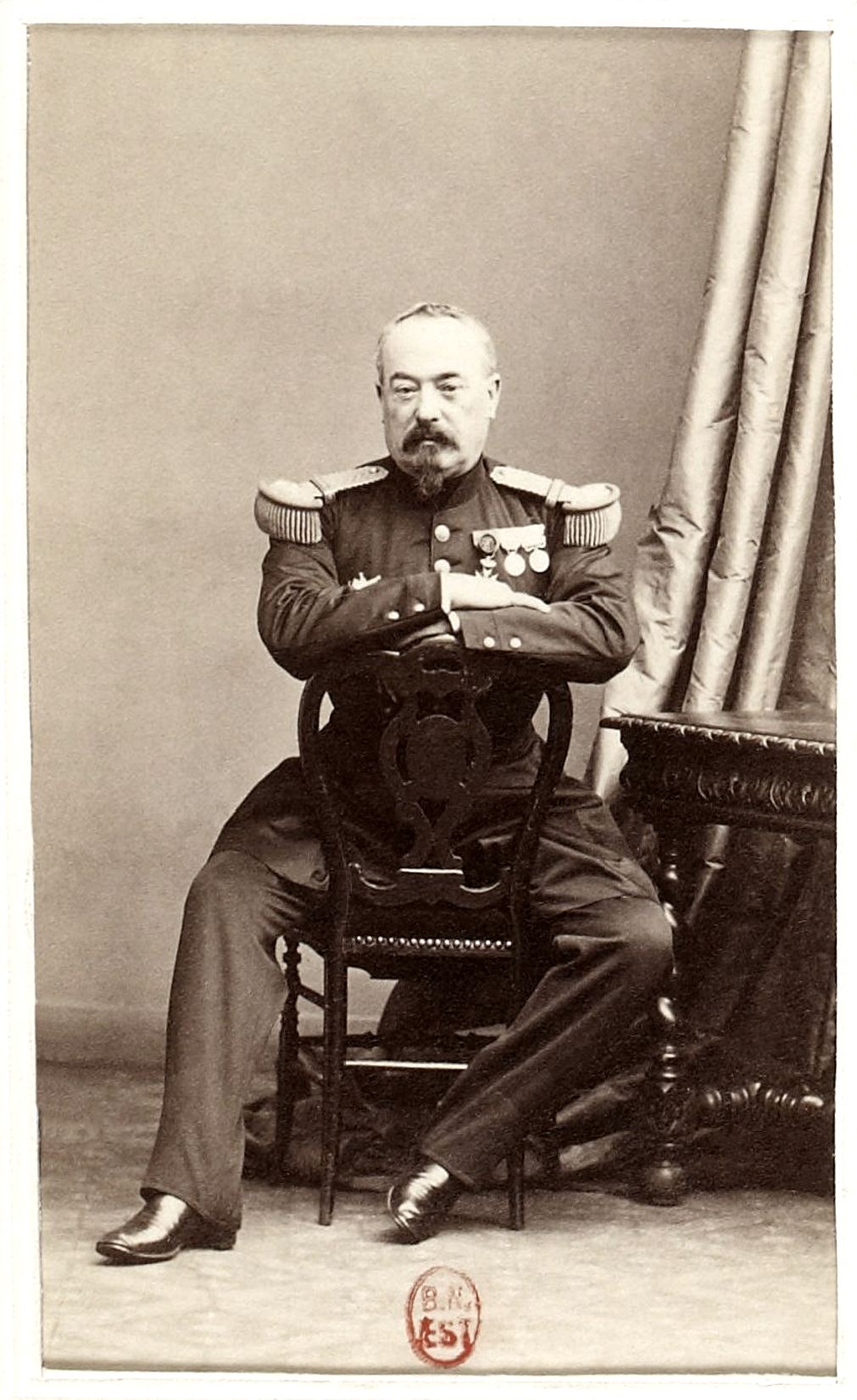
Francois Achille Bazaine in 1860.

Returned to Paris, he was designated as the general inspector of the 4th and 5th infantry arrondissements. The souvenir of Spain made him suggest to Napoleon III to lend the French Foreign Legion to the new emperor in Mexico. This idea would become that of the Emperor.

Bazaine was later designated to be part of France's expedition to Mexico.

Commandant of the 1st Infantry Division of expeditionary corps to Mexico on 1 July 1862, his action was decisive during the siege of Puebla in 1863. He commanded with great distinction the First Division under General (afterwards Marshal) Forey in the Mexican expedition in 1862, where he pursued the war with great vigour and success, driving President Benito Juárez to the frontier. His decisive action was instrumental in the taking of the city of Puebla in 1863. As a consequence, he was cited and designated at the head of the expeditionary corps by replacing Élie Frédéric Forey. Amongst the citations he received for the battle of San Lorenzo was the title of Grand Cross of France's Legion of Honour. Bazaine, who had started as a Legionnaire, was elevated to the dignity of Marshal of France and Senator of the Second French Empire by Imperial decree on 5 September 1864. He commanded in person the siege of Oaxaca in February 1865, following which, the Emperor complimented him while decorating him with the Médaille militaire, on 28 April 1865.

Here as in 1870, two of Bazaine's nephews, Adolphe and Albert Bazaine-Hayter served with their uncle as his aide-de-camp. Bazaine's African experience as a soldier and as an administrator stood him in good stead in dealing with the guerrilleros of the Juárez party, but he was less successful in his relations with Maximilian, with whose court the French headquarters was in constant strife.

His first wife died while he was in Mexico. On 28 May 1865, while still in Mexico, Bazaine got engaged and married to Maria-Josefa Pedraza de la Peña y Barragán, who was described as belonging to "a respectable Mexican family, well connected with the Spanish aristocracy and had numerous friends in high places" by the media at the time. Maximilian I of Mexico offered him the palace of Buena Vista.

Opinion is divided on his actions. Some argued that he aimed to depose Maximilian and get the throne of Mexico for himself, or that he aspired to play the part of a Bernadotte. In a New York Times opinion piece:-

His conduct in Mexico had been so unprincipled, so rascally in every respect, that it had been even a question at one time of trying him by court-martial.

In a contrary New York Times opinion piece:-

Marshal Bazaine has long rested under a cloud in his country on account of his connection with the invasion of Mexico by Maximillian, and, feeling as Americans did and still do about this enterprise of Emperor Napoleon, it is difficult to form an unprejudiced estimate of the character of the man who took so prominent a part in that fortunately unsuccessful effort to established an empire on our Southern border. The Marshal, however, was simply obeying the orders of his Government, and should not be held responsible for his action in Mexico.

His marriage to a rich Mexican lady (Pepita de la Peña y Azcarate), whose family were supporters of Juárez, still further complicated his relations with the unfortunate emperor, and when at the close of the American Civil War the United States sent a powerful war-trained army to the Mexican frontier. On the commend of Napoleon III, Bazaine withdraw the French forces to France, embarkation at Veracruz (1867). His wife followed him back to France.

Consequently, his relations with Emperor Maximilian became tense. He was accused of dragging the expedition against the will of Napoleon III, a situation which provoked his repatriation. On 12 November 1867, he obtained the commandment of the 3rd Army Corps at Nancy, and the following year, he commanded the camp of Châlons then replaced Auguste Regnaud de Saint-Jean d'Angély at the head of the Imperial Guard.

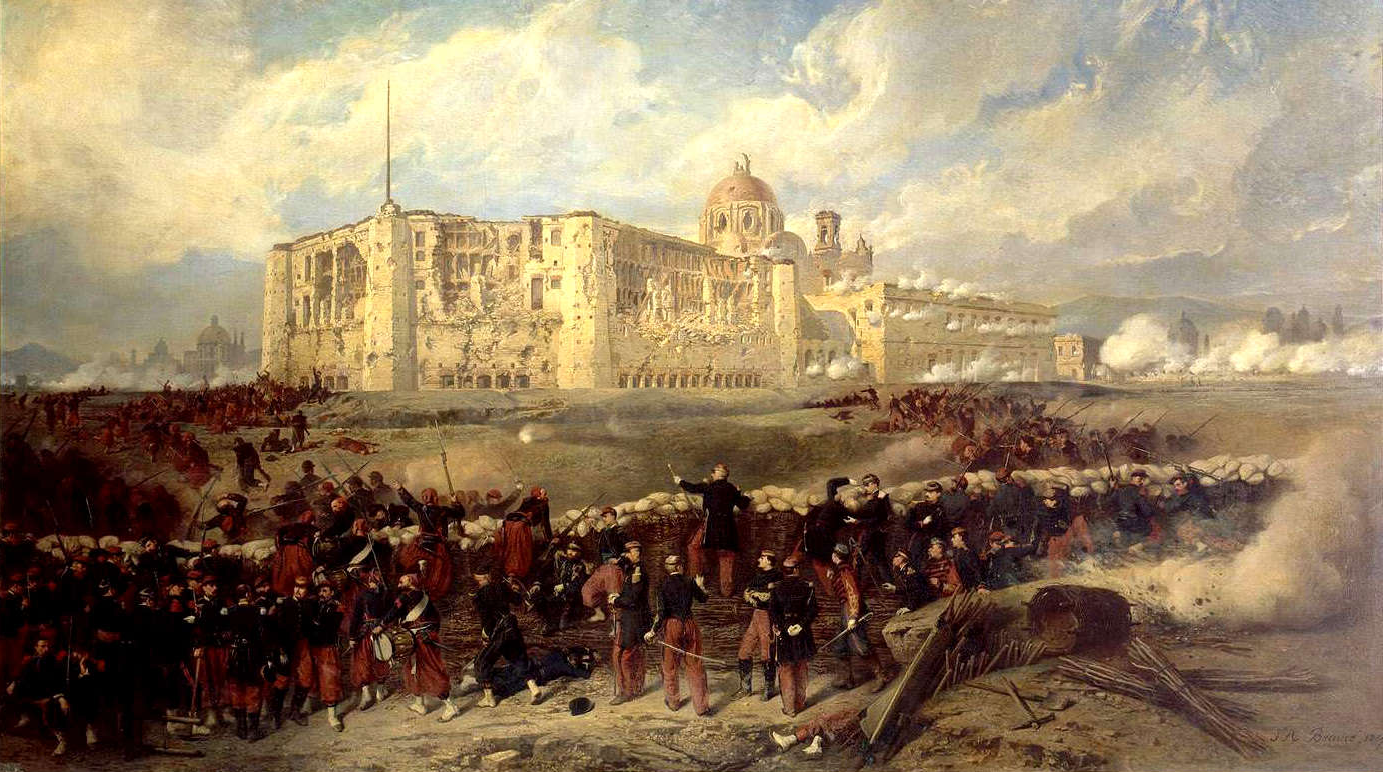
General Bazaine (front centre) attacking the Fort San-Xavier during the Siege of Puebla. General Bazaine Attacks Fort San Xavier During the Siege of Puebla by Jean-Adolphe Beaucé, 1867

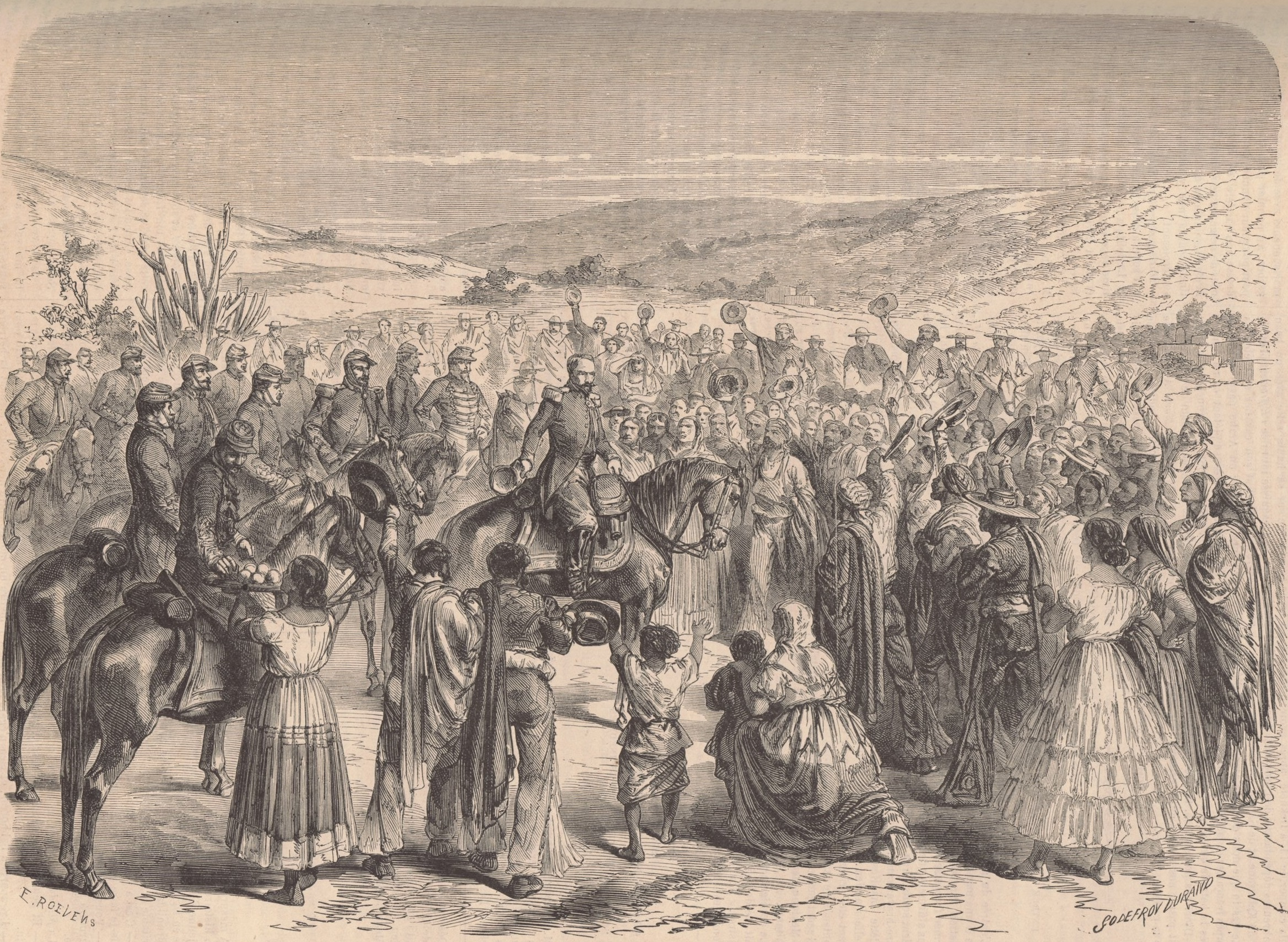
The population of Guadalajara welcomes General Bazaine as he is entering the city.

== Franco-Prussian War ==
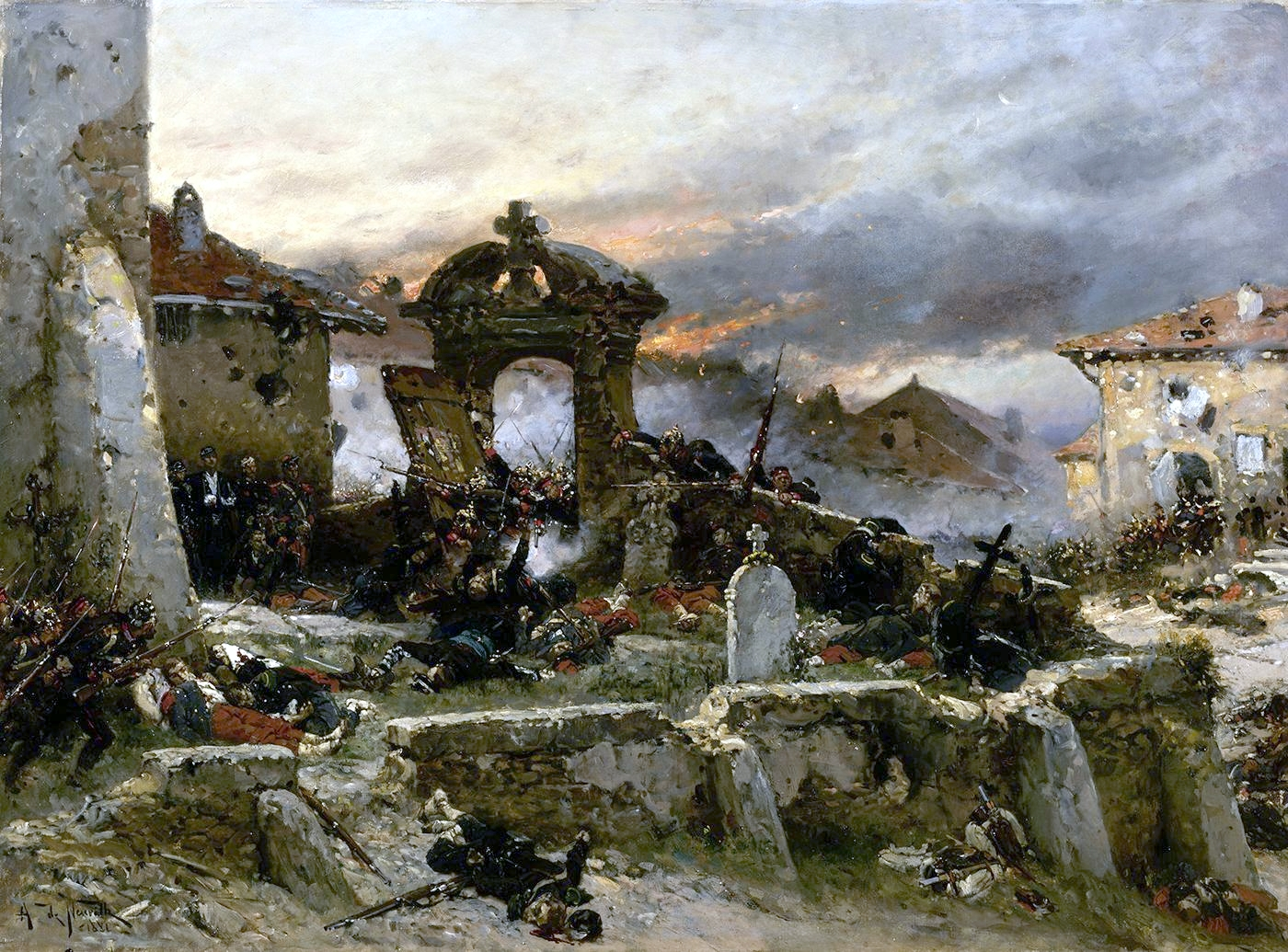
Battle of Saint-Privat.

At the outbreak of the Franco-Prussian War in 1870, Bazaine took field command of the French front line forces of III Army Corps of the Army of the Rhine near Metz.

=== Prelude ===
On 12 August 1870, during the war, Bazaine was nominated as the commander-in-chief of the Army of the Rhine, which was forced to deploy towards Châlons-sur-Marne to rejoin reserves in order to face the German troops. On the other hand, while he was presented with the occasion to destroy several enemy army corps following the Battle of Mars-la-Tour, on 16 August, he decided, to the astonishment of his general staff headquarters, to deploy his army of 180,000 men at Metz, accordingly cutting himself off from France and his reserves. Two days later, on the eve of the Battle of Saint-Privat, Marshal François Certain de Canrobert urgently and repeatedly requested reinforcements from Bazaine, but did not obtain them. The latter had judged that Saint-Privat was not an important battle and refused to engage his reserve troops, which were numerous. No reinforcements were sent to the French troops which were engaged heroically in combat on the plateau and Bazaine didn't even appear on the field of battle.

Directing the only truly organized armed force of France at that moment, he seemed to consider it mainly as a political tool and contemplated the various intrigues, notably with the Empress, probably to restore the Empire torn since 4 September. He negotiated equally with the Germans the authorization of an exit of his army « pour sauver la France d'elle-même » (to save France from itself), which meant from the republican push, as in revolutionary. It was during this stage that he vigorously opposed captain Louis Rossel who wanted to pursue the war and not betray his country (Rossel was the only officer to join since 19 March 1871 the Paris Commune).

Since the Fall of Sedan, on 2 September, he represented the last hope in the French camp, Bazaine renounced to pursue combat and capitulated on 28 October. This surrender is often explained by the lack of motivation of Bazaine to defend a government which was corresponding less and less to his conservative ideas. However, Bazaine also presented the situation differently in a letter on 2 November 1870 in the Journal du Nord (Northern Journal): "famine, the atmospheres brought down the arms of 63,000 real combatants which remained (the artillery no longer fixed and the cavalry demounted, all this after having eaten the majority of horses and searched the land in all directions to find rarely a weak provision to general privations).[...] Add to this dark painting more 20,000 sick or wounded to the point of absence of medicines and a torrential rain since 15 days now, flooding the camps and not allowing the men to rest because their small tents were the only shelter they had".

The news of this surrender afflicted France, while general Louis-Jules Trochu couldn't even seem to loosen the German noose around Paris which was besieged. Léon Gambetta, gone to Tours in the hope to assemble a Liberation army, understood that his initiative was unworkable and accordingly launched a proclamation where he explicitly accused Bazaine of treason in his speech: "Metz was capitulated. A general on whom France was counting, even after Mexico, just lifted from the Nation more than a 100,000 of its defenders. Marshal Bazaine has betrayed. He has made himself the agent of Sedan, the partner in crime with the invader, and, in the middle of the army which had the guard of, he simply delivered it, without even attempting a supreme effort, 120,000 combatants, 20,000 wounded, guns, cannons, the flags and the strongest citadels of France, Metz, virgin, to him, of foreign defilements".

=== Takes over as Commander in Chief from Napoleon III ===
Bazaine took no part in the earlier battles, but after the defeats of Marshal MacMahon's French Forces at Wörth and Marshal Canrobert's at Forbach, Napoleon III (who was in increasingly poor health) was swift to give Bazaine the title of Commander-in-Chief of the French Army on 13 August 1870. At the time, Napoleon's choice was considered to be a wise one. It was widely believed by French politicians and soldiers alike, that if anyone was capable of saving France from the Prussian onslaught, it was "notre glorieux Bazaine" ("our glorious Bazaine"). He was the only remaining Marshal of France not to have suffered defeat at the hands of Prussian forces in the early weeks of the war. However, being the youngest of the French Marshals, Napoleon's choice was met with suspicion and jealousy by the older, socially superior Marshals. Hence it was with reluctance that he took up the chief command, and his tenure became the central act in the tragedy of 1870. He found the army in retreat, ill-equipped and numerically at a great disadvantage, and the generals and officers discouraged and distrustful of one another. Bazaine's solution was to bring back his army to Metz. The day after assuming command of the Army, on 14 August at Borny he was badly wounded by a shell on the left shoulder, a fact which was to be excluded from his service roll presented at his Court Martial in 1873.

=== Spicheren ===
The armies of France, led by Bazaine, took up defensive positions that would protect against every possible attack, but which also left their armies unable to support one another. Taking up "strong positions" in small-scale battles, was a common military strategy of French generals of 1870. Frossard ("the school master"), lately the Prince Imperial's tutor, who was now in commander of the army corps posted at Spicheren, was a "strong position" tactic advocate. The "strong positions" tactic has been blamed for the paralysis of the rest of the army, which left the corps at Spicheren unsupported, and ultimately lead to the French defeat at the ensuing Battle of Spicheren. When called upon, Bazaine moved part of his corps forward, but only to "take up strong positions," not to strike a blow on the battlefield.

Remaining in Metz was based on the knowledge that if the slow-moving French army ventured far out it would infallibly be headed off and brought to battle in the open by a superior numbered adversary. In "strong positions" close to his stronghold, however, Bazaine hoped that he could inflict damaging repulses on the German enemy. The over-cautious troop movement, to prevent surprise rushes and ambushes, reduced the mobility of a large army, which had favourable marching conditions, to 5 miles a day as against the enemy's rate of 15 miles a day. Bazaine attempted halfheartedly to begin a retreat on Verdun. In his book Episodes de la guerre de 1870 et le blocus de Metz, Bazaine retrospectively argues that Verdun was the best line of defense for France, and therefore Napoleon was right in ordering a retreat to Verdun, after the defeats of August. However, the French staff work and organization of the movement over the Moselle was so ineffective that when the German staff calculated that Bazaine was nearing Verdun, the French had in reality barely got their artillery and baggage trains through the town of Metz. Even on the battlefield Bazaine forbade the general staff to appear, and conducted the fighting by means of his personal orderly officers.

Bazaine and his staff officers including Colonel Willette and his nephews Capt Adolphe Bazaine-Hayter and Lt George Bazaine-Hayter in 1870

=== Mars-la-Tour ===
A cavalry patrol of the 1st Squadron of the 1st Hanoverian Dragoon Regiment No. 9, led by Rittmeister Oskar von Blumenthal, discovered that Marshal François Bazaine's 160,000-man Army of the Rhine was attempting to escape from Metz to join with French forces at Verdun. This intelligence prompted General Prince Friedrich Karl, commander of the Prussian Second Army, to order at 1900 on 15 August a grossly outnumbered group of 30,000 men of the advanced III Corps under General Constantin von Alvensleben to cut off the French line of retreat at Mars-la-Tour and Vionville. Bazaine's army had passed through on its way to Metz, and was attacked by this isolated corps of the enemy near the village of Mars-la-Tour. Bazaine's was able to successful repel the attack in spite of the fierce fighting by the two German corps. However, Alvensleben defeated all attempts by four French corps to dislodge his III Corps. On 16 August, Alvensleben attacked the French advance guard, believing that it was the rearguard of the retreating Army of the Rhine. Despite his misjudgment, Alvensleben held off four French corps for seven hours. The French could have swept away the key Prussian defense and escaped, however, Bazaine had no confidence in his generals or his troops, and contented himself with inflicting severe losses on the most aggressive portions of the German army. Ultimately the aggression and skill of the Prussians prevailed over Bazaine's gross indecision.

Citing the need to acquire more ammunition and the distance from the supply trains, Bazaine issued an order on the night of 16–17 August for his army to fall back closer to Metz. The strong defensive positions of the fortress would, he thought, enable him to inflict massive losses on the Germans and crush their armies. After resupplying, Bazaine would begin anew the march to the Meuse on 19 and 20 August. Despite some skirmishing on 17 August, the Prussians did not pursue the French in force, as attacking that day was not their intention. The French withdrew to the Plappeville plateau east of Gravelotte over the course of the day. There the Battle of Gravelotte would be fought on 18 August.

=== Gravelotte and Sedan ===
Two days later, while the French actually retreated on Metz (taking seven hours to cover 5 to 6 miles) the masses of the Germans gathered in front of Bazaine's Army at Gravelotte, intercepting his communication with the interior of France. This Bazaine expected, and feeling certain that the Germans would sooner or later attack him in his chosen position, he made no attempt to interfere with their concentration. The great battle was fought, and having inflicted severe punishment on his assailants, Bazaine fell back within the entrenched camp of Metz. But although he made no appeals for help, the only remaining army of France, Marshal Mac-Mahon's Army of Châlons, moved to rescue Bazaine. Napoleon III followed close behind MacMahon's army in a carriage. When on 2 September 1870, MacMahon blundered into a German trap at Sedan, the Emperor mounted a horse despite his pain, rode along the firing line for hours seeking death. It never found him. Napoleon III surrendered with 80,000 men. With Sedan the Second Empire collapsed, Napoleon III being taken as a prisoner of war.

=== Siege of Metz ===
The Prussian army of 200,000 men now besieged the city of Metz, where 3 French marshals, 50 generals, 135,000 men, and 600 guns were encircled. Bazaine attempted to break the siege at Noisseville on 31 August but the French were repulsed, losing 3,500 men in the attempt. There were supplies in Metz to last no more than a month, such that by early September the order was given for work horses to be slaughtered for food. By mid September, cavalry horses also began to be slaughtered. Without cavalry and horses to pull the guns, Bazaine's ability to mount effective attempts to break out rapidly diminished. On 7 October, hungry and immobilised, Bazaine dispatched two 40,000 man foraging parties along both banks of the Moselle, but the Prussian guns blew the French wagons off the road and the Prussian infantry cut swathes through the desperate French soldiers with Chassepots captured at Sedan. Over 2,000 men were lost in this operation. Typhus and smallpox was spreading and by 10 October, it is estimated that 19,000 of the French troops in Metz were hospitalised. A further attempt was made to break the siege on 18 October at Bellevue, but again the French troops were repulsed, with the loss of 1,250 men. The city was on its knees, the troops and inhabitants on the point of starvation.

=== Diplomacy, then surrender ===
As commander of the only remaining organized army of France, Bazaine refused to recognise the new Government of National Defence, formed following Napoleon's capture and the resulting collapse of his government, and instead engaged in a series of diplomatic negotiations with the Prussian high command and Empress Eugenie who with the Prince Imperial had fled to Hastings, England. The purport of these negotiations still remain to some extent obscure, but it is beyond question that he proposed with the permission of the Prussians to employ his army in "saving France from herself", perhaps to ignite a revolution against the government of the Third Republic. When considered in light of the fact that Bazaine had long been a known Bonapartist, his actions were clearly designed to forge a way to restore the monarchy.

The scheme collapsed. In 1870, he surrendered the last organized French army to Prussia during the Franco-Prussian War at the siege of Metz. Upon surrendering, the Army of the Rhine became prisoners of war to the number of 180,000. This surrender is often explained by Bazaine's lack of motivation to defend a government that corresponded less and less to his political ideals and the best interests of France, as he saw it. A week's further resistance would have potentially enabled the levies of the National Defence government to crush the weak forces of the Germans on the Loire and to relieve Paris. Upon Bazaine's surrender, the army of Prince Friedrich Karl of Prussia was deployed to the Second Battle of Orléans.

== Military commentary ==
Bazaine's awareness of his army's shortcomings against the well-known speed and menacing efficiency of the Prussian military machine, was evidenced in his remark to a friend whilst boarding the train from Paris to Metz: "Nous marchons à un désastre." ("We are walking into a disaster.") In Bazaine's book Episodes de la guerre de 1870 et le blocus de Metz, he later stated:-

"The initiatives of the Marshals or Generals placed at the head of the seven great Territorial Army Divisions was simply null. They were left to the directions of the Minister of War, and, what is more they could obtain no information as to the works of the same, or movement of material. For my part I saw the mitrailleuses only on their arrival at Metz."

From Bazaine's military analysis of various lessons of the war, e.g. Waterloo, i.e. that a line of resolute men on the defensive could again and again break an enemy attack; Mexico, i.e. Lee's dashing Confederates lose a war despite their commander's brilliance in attack; Africa, i.e. that dramatic sorties were invaluable in North Africa but risky against European armies; and the Prussian all-steel Krupp breech-loading gun which shaped the future of battlefield artillery, resulted on him concluding that the best approach for France is not an offensive one, stating "It is better to conduct operations systematically, i.e., defensively, as in the Seventeenth Century."

Later, in his book Episodes de la guerre de 1870 et le blocus de Metz, he laid the blame on the course of the war upon:-

"False patriots who mislead the nation, carrying it away to a resistance disastrous for the country, and only meant as a pedestal for themselves to mount on."

== Trial ==
=== Prelude ===
The defection of Bazaine liberated the army of besieging Germans, who hastened to Orléans to front face the initiative in progress of raising a Republican Army. It was then therefore easy to assign the moral weight of the defeat to Bazaine. In August 1873, he arrived at Paris, where an investigation was opened on the initiative of General Ernest Courtot de Cissey. The investigative board gave their advice which led to several accusations. Bazaine then requested that the case be presented to a war council. The royalists and the republicans held their bouc émissaire in order to lay all the responsibilities of a defeat on a Bonapartist and justify the proclamation of the French Republic of 4 September 1870, and attempting to show the incapacity of the Emperor, through his subordinate. Certain Bonapartists were not unhappy that Bazaine was being judged, as this obscured accordingly the responsibilities of Napoleon III. Bazaine was then the ideal expiatory victim, who was brought in front of a war council sitting at Grand Trianon. The Duke of Aumale, President, condemned him to death with military degradation for having capitulated in an open campaign, collaborated with the enemy, and surrendered Metz before having exhausted all available means of defense. However, the same tribunal, which just condemned him, signed unanimously and sent to the President of France (and the Minister of War) a request for mercy in regards to M. Marshal Bazaine. His sentence was commuted then to 20 years in prison, without degradation ceremony, by the new president, Marshal MacMahon, who also was beaten at Sedan. This inspired Victor Hugo to remark: "Mac-Mahon absolves Bazaine. Sedan washes Metz. The idiot protects the traitor."

=== Trial for Treason ===
The French nation could not rest with the thought that their military supremacy had been broken by the superiority of the Prusso-German armies; their defeats could have proceeded only from the treachery or incapacity of their leaders. The commanders who had surrendered the French fortresses to the enemy were subjected to a trial by court-martial under the presidency of Marshal Baraguey d'Hilliers. The majority of them were, on account of their proved incapacity or weakness, deprived of their military honours. Even Ulrich, the once celebrated commander of Strasbourg, whose name had been given to a street in Paris, was brought under the censure of the court-martial. However, Bazaine, as Commander-in-Chief, was attributed with the blame for the Third Republic for France's defeat at the hands of the Prussians.

On return from German captivity in 1872, Bazaine published his account of the events of 1870 in L'Armée du Rhin and formally requested and was granted a trial before a military court, in order to give an opportunity to clear his name and put his version of events to the public. For months he was imprisoned at the Grand Trianon in the Palace of Versailles with his wife and two youngest children, while preparations were made for the court-martial, which started the following year (6 October 1873) under the presidency of the Duc D'Aumale in the Grand Trianon's Peristyle.

For some time the Duke and his colleagues had been looking for a way out of their difficulty, by which they could save themselves, satisfy public clamor and yet avoid responsibility before history. Bazaine stated in his defence "I have graven on my chest two words – 'Honneur' et 'Patrie'. They have guided me for the whole of my military career. I have never failed that noble motto, no more at Metz than anywhere else during the forty-two years that I have loyally served France. I swear it here, before Christ". Despite a vigorous defence of Bazaine's actions by Lachaud, and the presentation of a number of strong witness statements from his staff including Colonel Willette, the court found Bazaine guilty of negotiating with and capitulating to the enemy before doing all that was prescribed by duty and honour.

Opinion has been divided on the veracity of the trial. One New York Times commentary piece wrote:-

"There was nothing shown in the trial at Versailles to prove to unprejudiced observers that Bazaine was a traitor, or that he had done all in his power to extricate his army from the perilous position in which it had been placed."

Bazaine surrendered only after receiving letters recommending him to do so from his generals, but the presentation of these at the trial was ignored. "I have read every word of the evidence [against Bazaine] and believe it to be the most malicious casuistry" (New York Times correspondent). A letter which Prince Frederick Charles wrote in Bazaine's favour only added to the wrath of the people, who cried aloud for his execution.

Another, contrary New York Times commentary piece wrote:-

The proofs alleged against him make it clear that he thought not of defeating or escaping from the enemy, but solely of becoming the arbiter of the fortunes of France. His defense is valueless against the evidence not only of witnesses, but of his own acts and writings. He, in short, convicts himself, and his habitual trickery and his ingrained habits of falsehood render it impossible to accept his own word on any subject. We not only consider the accusation fully proved against him, but we believe that his conduct was even worse than it appeared to be."

=== Sentencing ===
Sentenced to death by the government of the Third Republic following the war. The court unanimously sentenced Bazaine to 'degradation and death', and to pay the costs of the enormous trial (300,000 francs), which was to leave Bazaine's family penniless. Bazaine's reaction on being read the sentence of the court was "It is my life you want, take it at once, let me be shot immediately, but preserve my family". Since the Revolution, only two French Marshals have been condemned to death — Ney, by a Bourbon, and Bazaine, by an Orléans. But, as though the judges themselves felt a twinge of conscience at the sentence, they immediately and unanimously signed a petition for 'Executive Clemency' to the President of the Third Republic, Marshal MacMahon, although Bazaine refused to sign this petition himself.

Bazaine petitioned the government to commute his punishment to a simple banishment. MacMahon, was a fellow Foreign Legion Officer, had served in many campaigns alongside Bazaine, also been beaten at Sedan. MacMahon was visibly disgusted when he received the news of the Court's decision and was incensed by their attempt to pass responsibility to him. MacMahon first proposed life imprisonment, though he softened and commuted the punishment of death to twenty years' imprisonment and remitted the disgrace of the formalities of a military degradation ceremony.

Bazaine wrote to thank his fellow legionnaire, though he added, tongue in cheek, that he might have let his feelings run away with him. It was an academic concession for a man nearing sixty-three. Other have judged this move harshly in later years, with Victor Hugo writing “Mac-Mahon absolves Bazaine. Sedan washes Metz. The fool protects the traitor."

=== Escape ===
Bazaine was incarcerated in the Fort Royal on Île Sainte-Marguerite and treated rather as an exile than as a convict. During the night of 9–10 August 1874, at the instigation of his wife (Pepita) and assistance, who was only twenty-six in 1873, and with the help of ex-Captain Doineau of the Arab Bureaux, his aide de camp lieutenant-colonel Henri-Léon Willette, Bazaine escaped after two hundred and twenty-one days of imprisonment. During the night of 10 August 1874, using parcel rope supplied by Angelo Hayter, (son of the Court Painter Sir George Hayter) and baggage straps which he knotted into a rope, the 63-year-old attached one end to his body and tied the other end to a gargoyle and climbed down the 300 foot cliffs to a boat, which his wife had brought out from Cannes. They sailed to Genoa in Italy, and from there Bazaine came to London with his young family where he stayed for a time with his Hayter relations at 14 Harewood Square, NW (demolished during the building of Marylebone Station in the 1890s).

Bazaine was the only prisoner to have escaped from the Fort Royal. A terrace of the fort, now housing a museum, is today named after Bazaine, due to his legendary escape.

== Later life ==
By midsummer 1875, Bazaine had settled in Madrid, where he was treated with marked respect by the Spanish government of Alfonso XII, in deference to his role in the Carlist War. Queen Isabella had arranged lodgings for him and his family in the Calle Hortaleza. With his own means stripped of him, he had his eldest son's pay to depend upon besides the assistance of some well-known army men who were charitable to the old soldier. However Bazaine's position in society was undermined by the negative influence of France. Admiral Jaures (French Ambassador in Madrid) had made it a rule to leave every ball, fete, or drawing room where he met Bazaine, on several instances naming the Court-Martial as the reason.

== Assassination attempt ==
On 18 April 1887, Louis Hillairaud, a French national and correspondent for the Paris newspaper Courrier de Rochelle, was paying a visit to Bazaine in Madrid. Bazaine's report of the incident was that "He thought, at first, that the man was an applicant for alms, like so many Frenchmen at Madrid". After a short conversation, Hillairaud stabbed Bazaine with a dagger (poniard), who was dangerously, though not fatally, wounded on the head. During the attack, Hillairaud shouted "J'ai vengé ma patrie" ("I avenged my country."), telling police later that he had come there with the intention of killing Bazaine. The wound was said to be "slight", and Bazaine was described as "slowly recovering" from his wound a month later.

== Personal life ==
Bazaine became a freemason in 1834. That year, in Tlemcen, he married Maria-Juane de la Soledad Gregorio Tormo (born in Murcia). She died by suicide in 1860. On 28 May 1865, he married the 18 year-old Mexican woman Maria-Josefa Pedraza de la Peña y Barragán (1847-1900).

Bazaine had four children: Maximilien (d. 1869), François-Achille, Eugénie (1869-) and Alphonse (1870-1949), who became a noted Spanish officer.

== Death ==
Bazaine's health had progressively slowly deteriorated due to the injuries received during his 40-year-long military career. Pepita took her daughter and one of her sons to Mexico, to look after the little fortune she had left, awaiting Mexican government compensation for the couple's property losses. Bazaine stayed in Madrid (Spain) with his eldest son, Alfonse Bazaine. He downgraded his lodgings to the Calle Atocha, where he cooked for himself, retaining his cigars as his one remaining luxury.

After the departure of his family, Bazaine's health declined. His eyesight deteriorated, and he broke his leg whilst walking on a frosty day in Retiro Park. He began to take little care of his personal appearance, growing a long grayish beard and became a source of pity by local Spaniards. At his Madrid lodgings, Bazaine died of a stroke on 23 September 1888 (aged 77), after an infection he contracted during the Madrid winter of 1887/8. Afonse Bazaine, now a Corporal of the Chasseurs in the Spanish army, was away from Madrid when his father died.

Bazaine's remains were interred on 24 September 1888 in the Madrid's San Justo Cemetery. An official funeral was celebrated in the presence of the Minister of War, Spanish marshals including Marshal Campos, one of his brothers, and his sons. Bazaine's sword and epaulettes rested on his coffin, instead of floral emblems.

The officiating priest was a relative of his wife.

Bazaine's daughter (Eugenie Bazaine), returned from Mexico back to Spain on 20 January 1900 an orphan, after the subsequent death of her mother who had been taken to hospital with a serious illness on 26 December 1899.

== Reputation ==
Harsh criticism featured in French newspapers upon Bazaine's death "Let his corpse be flung in to the first ditch. As for his memory, it is nailed forever to the pillory". German papers refer to Bazaine kindly and repeated that he was wronged by his own people.

On 7 July 1911, the Minister of Justice received a petition from Bazaine's son Alfonse Bazaine asking for the rehabilitation of his father. In commenting on the application the Correspodencia Militar, the organ of the Spanish War Office, said:-

"Many persons believe that the unfortunate Marshal was the victim of a fatality or a mistake of judgment, and many articles and books have been printed in his defense, and now, at length, a worthy Spanish officer, son of Marshal Bazaine, has addressed to the Minister of Justice of the French Republic a request, based on the terms of the law of 1895, for the revision of judgment of the court-martial of Trianon which convicted his late father. It is quite possible, indeed certain, that the position of Alphonse Bazaine will revive in France as well as abroad a passionate controversy as to the guilt or innocence of the Marshal."

In the same year as Bazaine's death, Count d'Herrison published an account in defence of the Bazaine's decisions during the Franco-Prussian war, which casting doubt upon the characters and motivations of witnesses whose testimonies were key to the court's findings that Bazaine was guilty of treason. Between 1904 and 1912, the French Court of Appeal lawyer Élie Peyron published several works in Bazaine's defence.

"The Duke, Marshal and 3rd President of France de MacMahon, survived Bazaine by five years; Paris gave President Marshal MacMahon a funeral that choked the wide boulevards for hours. The Doyen of Marshals de Canrobert, last of the Foreign Legion Marshals of the Second French Empire, was buried like a prince in 1895. The Foreign Legion, which has never felt obliged to accept the French view on anything, still honours Bazaine. In its museum there exists almost no trace of MacMahon, nor of Canrobert or of de Saint-Arnaud. Bazaine however has his own corner, adorned with his battered kepi, the bits and pieces of the harness he used at Rezonville and Gravelotte, and the cross Conrad pinned on him after Macta. The Legion knows that courage is not a mask that a soldier can wear or discard at will".

The Legion annually pays tribute to Bazaine.

== Decorations ==
For the accusations brought upon him, he was suspended of his rights to wear his French and Foreign decorations.

The decorations and distinctions which he had formerly earned were:

- Grand Cross of France's Legion of Honour (2 July 1863)
- Médaille Militaire
- Commemorative Medals of Crimea, Italy and Mexico
- Companion of the Order of the Bath
- Knight Grand Cross of the Italian Order of Savoy
- Grand Ciordon of the Order of Léopold of the Belgians
- Knight Grand Cross of the Order of the Lion and the Sun of Persia
- Grand Cross of the Order of the Mexican Eagle
- Knight Grand Cross of the Order of our Lady of Guadalupe
- Knight of the Order of St. Ferdinand of Spain
- Knight of the Order of Charles III of Spain
- Knight of the Order of Isabel the Catholic
- Silver Medal of the Old Military Order of Savoy

He was cited 10 times for serving France and 4 times for serving Spain.

== Works ==
Bazaine published a number of books about the Franco-Prussian war, and his version of events.

In the spartan rooms of the Calle Hortaleza, he wrote Episodes de la guerre de 1870 et le blocus de Metz, which was published in 1883 during Bazaine's exile in Madrid. This book also recorded his defence against the 1873 accusation of treason, it was not directed to a vindication of Bazaine's conduct during the Franco-German War, but instead a sort of history of that disastrous campaign, with a considerable portion of the book devoted to setting forth how the catastrophes of 1870 might have been prevented, or at least diminished, providing facsimiles of official documents, dispatches, and letters, including a report addressed by the Emperor Napoleon in captivity at Wilhelmshohe and a communication to Empress Engénie during the events of Metz, and maps to elucidate the campaign. In France this work was immediately forbidden.

Title	Translation	Year
Ma justification par Basaine : réponse aux brochures intitulées : L'homme de Metz, avec pièces à l'appui	My justification by Basaine: response to the brochures entitled: L'homme de Metz, with supporting documents	1870
Rapport du maréchal Bazaine : Bataille de Rezonville. Le 16 août 1870	Summary report on the operations of the Army of the Rhine, from August 13 to October 29, 1870	1871
Capitulation de Metz : Rapport officiel du maréchal Bazaine	Capitulation of Metz: Official Report of Marshal Bazaine	1871
L'armée du Rhin depuis le 12 août jusqu'au 29 octobre 1870	The Army of the Rhine from 12 August 12 to 29 October 1870	1872
Episodes de la guerre de 1870 et le blocus de Metz	Episodes from the War of 1870 and the Blockade of Metz	1883

== Appearances in Fiction ==
There is a brief reference to Bazaine in David Weber's science fiction novel, In Death's Ground (1997), the third novel in that author's Starfire series of novels.

Clamence in Albert Camus's novella "The Fall" refers to family and connections as 'Bazaines'

His actions during the French interdiction in Mexico are recorded in Norman Zollinger's novel "Chapultepec."

Along with Napoleon III, Bazaine plays a small, but crucial role, in April and the Extraordinary World.

Bazaine, along with Napoleon III, Empress Eugenie, and Maximilian I appear in Luis Valdez's play Adios Mama Carlota.

== See also ==
- Origins of the French Foreign Legion
- Jean-Luc Carbuccia
- Legion of Honour
- Legion of Honour Museum
- List of Legion of Honour recipients by name (B)
- Ribbons of the French military and civil awards
- War Cross (France)

== Sources ==
- - Memoir by Camille Pelletan in La Grande Encyclopédie
  - Bazaine et l'armée du Rhin (1873)
  - J Valfrey Le Maréchal et l'armée du Rhin (1873)
  - Count A de la Guerronière, L'Homme de Metz (1871)
  - Rossel, Les Derniers fours de Metz (1871)
  - La Brugère, L'Affaire Bazaine (Paris, 1874)
  - Comte d'Hérisson, La légende de Metz (Paris, 1888)
  - Henri d'Orléans, duc d'Aumale: Procès Bazaine, affaire de la capitulation de Metz, seul compte rendu sténographique in extenso des séances du 1er conseil de guerre de la 1re division militaire ayant siégé à Versailles (Trianon), du 6 octobre au 10 décembre 1873 / sous la présidence de M. le Général de division Duc d'Aumale. – Paris : Librairie du Moniteur Universel, 1873
  - Amédée Le Faure: Procès du Maréchal Bazaine. Rapport. Audiences du premier conseil de guerre. Compte rendu rédigé avec l'adjonction de notes explicatives. – Paris : Garnier, 1874
  - F. de La Brugère (Arthème Fayard): L' Affaire Bazaine : Compte-rendu officiel et in extenso des débats, avec de nombreuses biographies. – Paris : Fayard, 1874
  - Robert Christophe: Bazaine innocent. – Paris : Nantal, 1938
  - Robert Burnand: Bazaine. – Paris : Librairie Floury, 1939
  - Robert Christophe: La vie tragique du maréchal Bazaine. – Paris : Editions Jacques Vautrin, 1947
  - Jean Cahen-Salvador: Le procès du maréchal Bazaine. – Lausanne : La Guilde du Livre, 1946
  - Edmond Ruby und Jean Regnault: Bazaine coupable ou victime? A la lumière de documents nouveaux. – Paris : J. Peyronnet & Cie, 1960
  - Maurice Baumont: Bazaine : les secrets d'un maréchal (1811–1888). – Paris : Imprimerie Nationale, 1978. – ISBN 2-11-080717-2
- "Bazaine, François Achille" . Appletons' Cyclopædia of American Biography. 1900.
- Colonel Willette, L'évasion du Maréchal Bazaine de L'ile Sainte-Marguerite par son compagnon de captivité. Textes Inedits par André Castelot. Librairie Academique Perrin 1973.
