= Charles Auguste Frossard =

French general

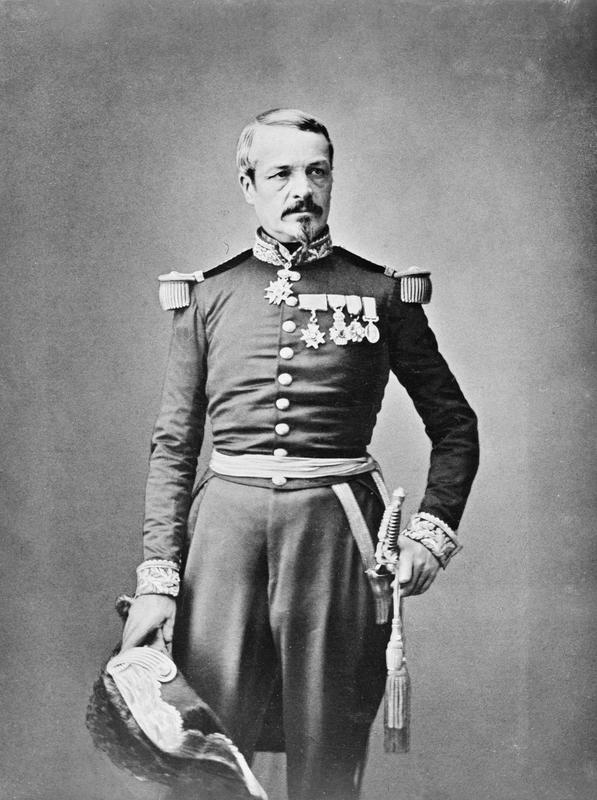
- Charles Frossard
- Born: 26 April 1807; Versailles, France
- Died: 25 August 1875 (aged 68); Châteauvillain, France
- Military career
- Allegiance: France
- Branch: French Army
- Service years: 1827–1875
- Rank: Général de division
- Conflicts: Crimean War; Franco-Austrian War; Franco-Prussian War
- Awards: Grand Officer of the Légion d'honneur Médaille Militaire

Charles Auguste Frossard (26 April 1807 – 25 August 1875) was a French general.

He entered the army from the École polytechnique in 1827, being posted to the engineers. He took part in the siege of Rome in 1849 and in that of Sevastopol in 1855, after which he was promoted general of brigade. Four years later as general of division, and chief of engineers in the Italian campaign, he attracted the particular notice of the emperor Napoleon III, who made him in 1867 chief of his military household and governor to the prince imperial.

He was one of the superior military authorities who in this period 1866-1870 foresaw and endeavoured to prepare for the inevitable war with Germany, and at the outbreak of the Franco-Prussian War he was given by Napoleon the choice between a corps command and the post of chief engineer at headquarters. He chose the command of the II corps. On 6 August 1870 he held the position of Spicheren against the Germans until the arrival of reinforcements for the latter and the non-appearance of the other French corps compelled him to retire. After this he took part in the battles around Metz, where he distinguished himself at Mars-la-Tour and Gravelotte. He then participated with his corps in the Siege of Metz and was involved in the surrender of Bazaine's army. General Frossard published in 1872 a Rapport sur les operations du 2 corps. He died at Cháteau-Villain (Haute-Marne).
