= Calle de Hortaleza =

Street in Madrid, Spain

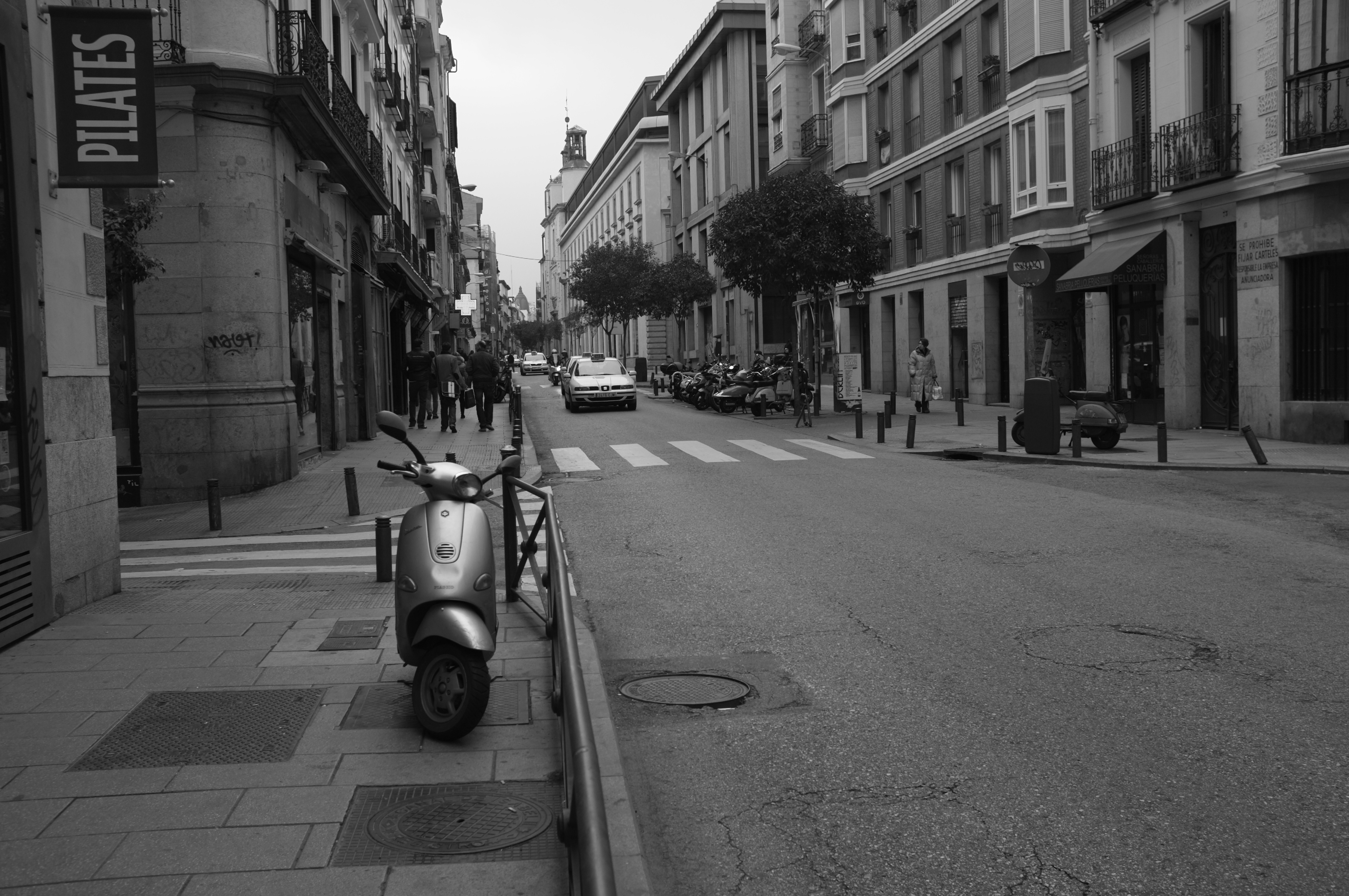
- Type: street
- Location: Madrid, Spain
- South end: Gran Vía
- North end: Plaza de Santa Bárbara

The Calle de Hortaleza is a street in central Madrid, Spain. It is arguably the main thoroughfare passing through Chueca, the epicenter of the LGBT community in the city.

== History and description ==
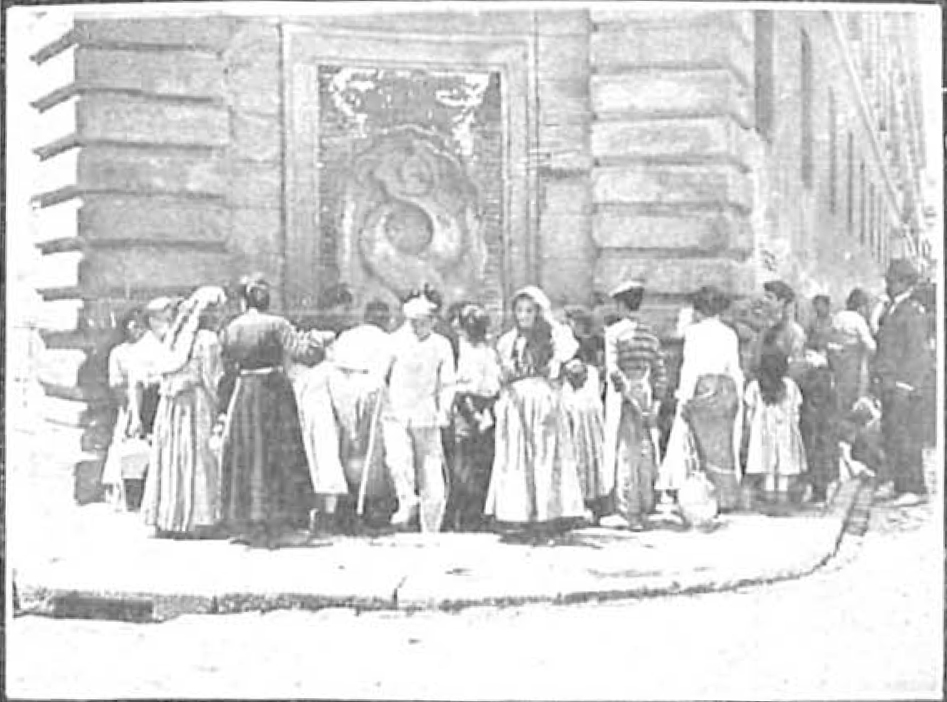
People gathered around the Fountain of San Antón circa 1904

Entirely located in the administrative neighborhood of Justicia (Centro District), it starts at its junction with the Gran Vía (near the so-called "Red de San Luis"), and running northwards it ends at the Plaza de Santa Bárbara. a widening of the street, at whose end the Gate of Santa Bárbara was located in ancient times, the origin point of the roads to the villages of Chamartín and Hortaleza. In the 17th century the street was part of the slums beyond the boundaries of the enclosed city centre.

Some of the standout landmarks located along the street include the School of San Antón-Escolapios (63), the convent of Santa María Magdalena de la Penitencia (88), the School of Santa Isabel (77), and the Fountain of San Antón.
