= Adolphe Bazaine-Vasseur =

French railway engineer (1809–1893)

Pierre-Dominique Bazaine
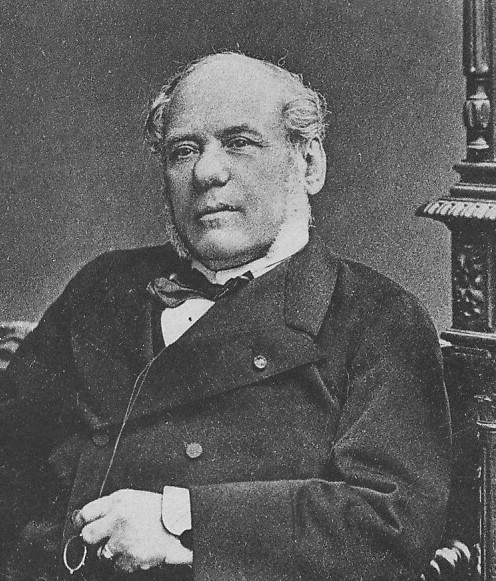
- Bazaine in 1890
- Born: 1 December 1809; Versailles, France
- Died: 1893 (aged 83–84); France
- Education: École polytechnique
- Relatives: Francois Achille Bazaine (brother)
- Awards: Legion of Honour – Officer (1861)
- Scientific career
- Fields: Engineer

Pierre-Dominique "Adolphe" Bazaine (1 December 1809 – 1893), was a French railway engineer. He was a regional engineer with the highways department at Altkirch, subsequently becoming director of railways for Alsace.

== Early life ==
Son of Pierre-Dominique Bazaine (1786–1838), also an engineer, and of Mary Madeleine Josèphe (known as Mélanie) Vasseur. Adolphe was the elder brother of François Achille Bazaine, the Marshal of France. Adolphe entered École polytechnique in 1827, and then the school of the department of civil engineering.

== Career ==
Bazaine was appointed engineer of district of the department of civil engineering to Altkirch (High Rhine). Adolphe Bazaine was then given responsibility for the construction of the railway line from Mulhouse to Thann; then, with Mr. Chaperone, he established the project of the section Strasburg Bâle. He remained there, overseeing the railways of Alsace up to 1842. He was then given the project of building the canal of the Sauldre from 1 January 1849, replacing Charles Augustus Machart, but in fact his activity principally consisted of prepare and carry out the liquidation of the Workshops. He finished Sauldre on 1 May 1849. Afterwards, he supervised different railway businesses in the North, the Bourbonnais (the line from Andrézieux to Le Coteau from 1855), and the Charentes (Company of the Charentes from 1862).

Bazaine was in communication with the utopian socialists Charles Fourier and Victor Considérant (his fellow student polytechnicien of the graduate class of 1826), who after the failure of the revolutionary attempt of 13 June 1849, took refuge at his house while awaiting to be able to flee in Belgium.

== Personal life ==
Bazaine was the brother-in-law of the engineer and physicist Paul Émile Clapeyron, spouse of Mélanie Bazaine-Vasseur.

He married Georgina Elizabeth Hayter, daughter of the Victorian court painter Sir George Hayter and they had 3 children Achille (George), Adolphe and George (Albert).

== Awards ==
By decree on 15 April 1841, Bazaine was made a Knight of France's Legion of Honour By decree on 5 August 1861 he was promoted in rank to the rank of Officer in the Legion of Honour award system.

== Works ==
- Études sur les voies communication: I. Chemins vicinaux

== See also ==
- Legion of Honour
- Legion of Honour Museum
- List of Legion of Honour recipients by name (B)
- Ribbons of the French military and civil awards
