= George Albert Bazaine-Hayter =

French general (1843–1914)

- Born: 4 December 1843; Amiens, France
- Died: 30 January 1914 (aged 70); Morcote, Switzerland
- Military career
- Allegiance: France
- Branch: Infantry
- Service years: 1862–1908
- Rank: Général de Division
- Commands: 1st Infantry Brigade (Tunisia) (1899); Governor of Nice defences and Antibes (1901–1903); 57th Infantry Brigade (Digne) (1903–1904); 10th Infantry Division (1904–1906); Member of the Committee of Infantry Techniques and the Committee of Colonial Forces (1904–1906); 13th Army Corps, Clermont-Ferrand (1906–1907); 4th Army Corps (1908)
- Conflicts: Mexican Campaign (1862–1866); Franco-Prussian War (1870–1871); Tonkin; Algeria
- Awards: Legion of Honour - Grand Officier (1908); Mexican Campaign Medal; Franco-Prussian War Medal; Tonkin Campaign Medal; Colonial Medal (Algeria)

George Albert Bazaine-Hayter (4 December 1843 – 30 January 1914), known as Albert, was a French general.

== Early life ==
Bazaine-Hayter was the son of Pierre-Dominique (Adolphe) Bazaine and nephew of François Achille Bazaine, on whose General Staff he served in the French intervention in Mexico and during the Franco-Prussian War.

== Military service ==
Bazaine-Hayter engaged as a volunteer on 19 July 1862 in the 34th infantry regiment. When war was declared in 1870, he was appointed orderly officer of the Marshal commanding the 3rd corps of the Army of the Rhine. He attended all the battles fought under Metz.

When describing the French position in the Franco-Prussian War, in particular, the shortcomings of the military organisation; incoherence of the first operations; and the incompetence of command, which were described as a "harbinger of inevitable disasters", Bazaine-Hayter stated "We had no preparation: no horses to haul the artillery reserves and the bridge equipment, no tools to dig the trenches; our machine guns arrived directly from the factories and those using them were not properly trained in their use; our artillery was inferior in number, in effectiveness and in reach, in summary, we were powerless against the Prussian artillery. Our battle formations, already old in 1859, were old-fashioned and stuck in a rut; our procedures and regulations had not been reviewed for over 30 years; our orders, brave beyond doubt, were ignorant, without doctrine and without initiative. These were the causes of our defeats, of all our defeats".

He was taken prisoner on 29 October 1870, but eventually returned to France on 15 March 1871. After a short period of redundancy on 23 July 1871, he started back into military service on 11 November 1871.

Despite France's loss and his familial connection with François Achille Bazaine, who was eventually convicted of treason for his role in the Franco-Prussian War, Bazaine-Hayter had a successful military career of his own.

Bazaine-Hayter progress through a variety of military ranks:-

Date	Rank
19 July 1862	volunteer
16 October 1862	corporal
1 April 1863	sergeant
1 June 1864	second lieutenant
15 September 1866	lieutenant
13 July 1872	captain
29 December 1890	lieutenant-colonel
4 October 1883	major
10 July 1894	colonel
7 October 1899	brigadier general

Bazaine-Hayter was assigned to a number of military postings:-

Assignment	Posting	Location
19 July 1862	34th infantry regiment	
18 August 1862	95th infantry regiment	Toulon, to go to Mexico
1 April 1863	3rd regiment of Zouaves	
4 May 1867	18th battalion of foot hunters	Vincennes (Paris), France
11 November 1871	9th battalion chasseurs à pied	
13 July 1872	17th battalion chasseurs à pied	
March 1891	102nd infantry regiment	Mayenne
23 October	5th Infantry regiment	
7 October 1899	1st infantry brigade	Tunis, Tunisia
16 May 1901	57th Infantry Brigade	Nice, France
29 January 1904	10th infantry division	Paris, France
24 June 1906	13th Army Corps	Clermont-Ferrand, France
11 March 1907	4th Army Corps	Le Mans, France
4 December 1908	Reserve Section	N/A

He was also an early critic of the lack of effective French military preparation to counter the increasing threat posed to France by the German Empire. He was one of the early pioneers of military aviation and a keen supporter of the Wright brothers when they visited Camp d'Auvours, Le Mans in 1908.

Placed in the reserve section on 4 December 1908, at the end of a successful career.

== Personal life ==
He adopted his mother's maiden name Hayter as part of his surname in recognition of the support the Hayters gave to his unfortunate uncle, Marshal Bazaine, in escaping from his prison on Île Sainte-Marguerite and in his later life in exile.

== Awards ==
By decree on 9 September 1870, Bazaine-Hayter was awarded a Knight in France's Legion of Honour. This Legion of Honour rank was upgraded by decree on 4 May 1889 to that of Officier, and then again upgraded by decree on 3 September 1903 to Commander. He was ultimately awarded the title of Grand Officier by decree on 30 December 1908

== Works ==
He co-wrote a number of works on infantry tactics and the use of attacking tactics in infantry doctrine:-

Author	Title	Translation	Date
George Albert Bazaine-Hayter	La Nation Armée: Leçons Professées a L'École des Hautes Études Sociales	The Nation Armed: Lessons Professed at the School of Higher Social Studies	1909
Adrien Balédent (Preface: George Albert Bazaine-Hayter)	L'Infanterie à la Guerre	Infantry in War	1911

== Quotes ==
"Firepower does not weaken the offensive. Never forget that defensive battle will seldom bring victory. However powerful weapons become, the victory will go to the offensive which stimulates moral forces, disconcerts the enemy and deprives him of his freedom of action"

== Death ==
Bazaine-Hayter died on 30 January 1914 in Morcote (Switzerland).

== See also ==
- Legion of Honour
- Legion of Honour Museum
- List of Legion of Honour recipients by name (B)
- Ribbons of the French military and civil awards
- War Cross (France)
