= Butcher (surname) =

Butcher is a common family name in England but it may have French origins. It was originally an occupational surname used to identify a person who worked as a butcher. The name derived from the Old English word boucher or the Old French word bouchier. The German equivalent is 'Fleischhauer'.

Bearers of the surname include:

== A ==
- A. J. Butcher, English children's writer
- Adam Butcher (born 1988), Canadian film actor
- Adam Butcher (artist), British artist, game developer, and filmmaker
- Alan Butcher (born 1954), English cricketer
- Amy Butcher, American writer and essayist
- Arthur Butcher (1863–1955), English cricketer

== B ==
- Barbara Butcher, American forensic scientist
- Basil Butcher (1933–2019), West Indian cricketer
- Bilinda Butcher (born 1961), vocalist and guitarist with the rock band My Bloody Valentine

== C ==
- Clyde Butcher (born 1942), American photographer

== D ==
- David Butcher (born 1948), New Zealand politician
- David Butcher (cricketer) (born 1969), English cricketer
- Don Butcher (fl. 1930s), English squash player
- Donnis Butcher (1936–2012), American National Basketball Association player and coach

== E ==
- Edward Butcher, American politician

== F ==
- Fanny Butcher (1888–1987), American newspaper writer and literary critic
- Finn Butcher (born 1995), New Zealand slalom canoeist

== G ==
- Garth Butcher (born 1963), Canadian National Hockey League player
- Gary Butcher (born 1975), English cricketer
- Goler T. Butcher (1925–1993), American lawyer and professor
- Gordon Butcher, Australian member of The Warumpi Band
- Greg Butcher (1952–2023), American politician

== H ==
- Harry Butcher (politician) (1873–1956), Canadian politician
- Harry Butcher (racing driver) (1895–1942), American race car driver
- Harry C. Butcher (1901–1985), American radio broadcaster and World War II naval aide to General Dwight D. Eisenhower
- Herbert Butcher (1901–1966), British politician and longtime Member of Parliament

== I ==
- Ian Butcher (born 1962), English cricketer

== J ==
- Jake Butcher (1936–2017), American banker and politician
- Jason Butcher (born 1984), American mixed martial artist
- Jim Butcher (born 1971), American fantasy writer
- John Butcher (disambiguation)
- Jon Butcher (born 1955/1956), American singer, guitarist, and producer

== K ==
- Kristin Butcher (born 1951), Canadian writer and reviewer

== L ==
- Lisa Butcher (born 1971), English fashion model and TV presenter

== M ==
- Margaret Just Butcher (1913–2000), American educator, writer, and civil rights activist
- Marjorie V. Butcher (1925–2016), American mathematician
- Mark Butcher (born 1972), English cricket commentator and former player
- Max Butcher (1910–1957), American baseball pitcher
- May Butcher (1886–1950), English-born Maltese writer
- Mike Butcher (baseball) (born 1965), American baseball pitcher and coach
- Mike Butcher (footballer) (born 1942), Australian rules footballer
- Mike Butcher (journalist), journalist and editor

== P ==
- Paige Butcher (model), Australian fashion model, wife of Eddie Murphy
- Paul Butcher (American football) (born 1963), American football linebacker
- Paul Butcher (actor) (born 1994), American actor, son of the above

== R ==
- Richard Butcher (footballer) (1981–2011), English footballer
- Roland Butcher (born 1953), Barbadian-born English cricketer and coach
- Rory Butcher (born 1987), Scottish racing car driver

== S ==
- Sam Butcher (1939–2024), American artist
- Samuel Butcher (Royal Navy officer) (1770–1849), British naval officer
- Samuel Butcher (bishop) (1811–1876), Bishop of Meath, 1866–1876, son of the above
- Samuel Butcher (classicist) (1850–1910), Anglo-Irish classical scholar and politician, son of the above
- Solomon Butcher (1856–1927), American photographer
- Stephen Butcher (disambiguation)
- Susan Butcher (1954–2006), American dog musher, multiple winner of the Iditarod Trail Sled Dog Race

== T ==
- Terry Butcher (born 1958), English football manager and former player
- Thomas W. Butcher (1867–1947), American academic and university president
- Tim Butcher (born 1967), English journalist and author
- Tom Butcher (born 1963), English television actor

== W ==
- Wendell Butcher (1914–1988), American National Football League player
- Will Butcher (born 1995), American National Hockey League player
- Willard C. Butcher (1926–2012), American banker, chairman and CEO of Chase Manhattan Bank
- William Butcher (1858–1944), Australian politician
- William Butcher (academic) (died 1585), President of Corpus Christi College, Oxford (1559–1561)

== Fictional characters ==
- Baby Butcher, in the TV series The Boys
- Becca Butcher, in The Boys
- Becky Butcher, in The Boys
- Bianca Jackson/Butcher, in the British soap opera EastEnders
- Billy Butcher, in The Boys
- Clare Butcher, in EastEnders
- Connie Butcher, in The Boys
- Diane Butcher, in EastEnders
- Frank Butcher, in EastEnders
- Jacques Butcher, in EastEnders
- Janine Butcher, in EastEnders
- Lenny Butcher, in The Boys
- Liam Butcher, in EastEnders
- Mo Butcher, in EastEnders
- Morgan Butcher, in EastEnders
- Pat Butcher, in EastEnders
- Patrick Butcher, in the TV series Ghosts
- Peggy Mitchell, in EastEnders
- Ricky Butcher, in EastEnders
- Ryan Butcher, in The Boys
- Sam Mitchell, in EastEnders
- Sam Butcher, in The Boys
- Tiffany Butcher, in EastEnders

== See also ==
- Butcher (disambiguation)
  - Butcher
  - Butcher (nickname)
- Leboucher, a French surname
- Meat cutter
