= List of Légion d'honneur recipients by name (B) =

The French government gives out the Legion of Honour awards, to both French and foreign nationals, based on a recipient's exemplary services rendered to France, or to the causes supported by France. This award is divided into five distinct categories (in ascending order), i.e. three ranks: Knight, Officer, Commander, and two titles: Grand Officer and Grand Cross. Knight is the most common and is awarded for either at least 20 years of public service or acts of military or civil bravery. The rest of the categories have a quota for the number of years of service in the category below before they can be awarded. The Officer rank requires a minimum of eight years as a Knight, and the Commander, the highest civilian category for a non-French citizen, requires a minimum of five years as an Officer. The Grand Officer and the Grand Cross are awarded only to French citizens, and each requires three years' service in their respective immediately lower rank. The awards are traditionally published and promoted on 14 July.

The following is a non-exhaustive list of recipients of the Legion of Honour awards, since the first ceremony in May 1803. 2,550 individuals can be awarded the insignia every year. The total number of awards is close to 1 million (estimated at 900,000 in 2021, including over 3,000 Grand Cross recipients), with some 92,000 recipients alive today. Only until 2008 was gender parity achieved amongst the yearly list of recipients, with the total number of women recipients since the award's establishment being only 59 at the end of the second French empire and only 26,000 in 2021.

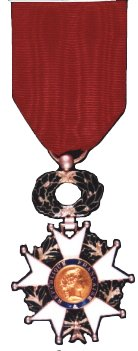

Recipient	Dates (birth–death)	General work & reason for the recognition	Award category (date)
Victor Babeș	1854–1926	Romanian physician and scientist	Knight (TBA)
John Tremayne Babington	1891–1979	Senior commander in the Royal Air Force	Knight (TBA)
Andre Bach	1888–1945		TBA
Amitabh Bachchan	1942	Indian actor. Recognised for his "exceptional career in the world of cinema and beyond".	Knight (2007)
Louis Bachelier	1870–1946	French mathematician. He is credited with being the first person to model the stochastic process now called Brownian motion.	Knight (TBA)
Michel Bacos	1924–2019	French pilot of Air France Flight 139. Recognised for refusing to leave his Jewish passengers behind, when captain of the terrorist-hijacked Air France Flight 139.	Knight (1976)
Absalom Baird	1824–1905	Union Army general in the American Civil War	Knight (TBA); Officer (TBA); Commander (TBA)
Josephine Baker	1906–1975	American-born French actress and Resistance agent	Knight (TBA)
Mangalampalli Balamuralikrishna	1930–2016	Indian Carnatic vocalist, musician, multi-instrumentalist, playback singer, composer, and character actor.	TBA
James Arthur Baldwin	1924–1987	African-American writer & defender of human rights	Knight (TBA); Officer (TBA); Commander (20 June 1986)
Albert Ball	1896–1917	World War I British fighter pilot	Knight (TBA); Officer (TBA); Commander (TBA); Grand Officer (TBA); Grand Cross (7 June 1917)
Benjamin Ball	1833–1893	English-born French psychiatrist	Knight (TBA)
Basile Baltus de Pouilly	1766–1845	General, French Revolutionary Wars and Napoleonic Wars	Knight (14 June 1804); Officer (26 December 1805); Commander (11 July 1807)
Raffaello de Banfield	1922–2008	British-born Italian composer	Knight (TBA)
François Barbé-Marbois	1745–1837	French politician	Grand Officer (1805)
Jean-François Barbier	1754–1828	General, French Revolutionary Wars and Napoleonic Wars	TBA
John J. Barceló III		American law professor	TBA
Van T. Barfoot	1919–2012	United States Army officer	TBA
Karno Barkah	1922–2009	Indonesian aviation pioneer	TBA (28 February 1984)
Michael Barker		Co-president and co-founder of Sony Pictures Classics	TBA
Myron G. Barlow	1873–1937	American painter. Recognised for his painting achievements. photo	TBA (1932)
George Barnett	1859–1930	12th commandant of the United States Marine Corps. He was a pioneer of amphibious warfare and the U.S. Marine Commandant during American involvement in World War I.	Knight (TBA); Officer (TBA); Commander (TBA)
Denis Gabriel Barois	1922	Delegate to the Superior Council of French Nationals Abroad (Mexico)	Knight (decree: 28 March 1997)
Théophile Barrau	1848–1913	French sculptor	Knight (1892)
Marcel Barrére	1920–1996	French aerospace engineer	Knight
Claude Barrès	1925–1959	French Army officer who served in World War II, the First Indochina War, the Korean War and the Algerian War	Knight (6 August 1952); Officer (21 August 1956); Commander (7 July 1959)
Charles Barrois	1851–1939	French geologist and palaeontologist	Knight (TBA); Officer (TBA); Commander (1923)
Jeanne Julia Bartet	1854–1941	French actress	Knight (TBA); Officer (TBA)
Marcus "Stub" Bartusek		World War II soldier (United States), 106th Infantry Division (United States), 424th Regiment	Knight (ceremony: 9 October 2018)
Dame Shirley Bassey	1937	U.K. (Welsh) singer	Knight (2003)
Maryse Bastié	1898–1952	French aviator. Her Knight rank was in recognition of her flight on 28 June 1931, a 2976 km journey from Le Bourget to Yurino (Russia) undertaken in 30 hours 30 minutes at an average speed of 97 km/h. Her officer rank was in reocognition of her flight aboard a Caudron 635 Simoun F-Anxo on 30 December 1936, which broke the record for crossing the South Atlantic in 12 hours 5 minutes. The commander rank was in recognition of her "exceptional war titles and acts of resistance".	Knight (1931); Officer (1936); Commander (1947)
Jean Ambroise Baston de Lariboisière	1759–1812	General, French Revolutionary Wars and Napoleonic Wars	Knight (TBA); Officer (TBA); Commander (TBA); Grand Officer (4 June 1807)
Jean Baubérot	1941	French historian and sociologist (religions). He is known for being the founder of secularism sociology.	Knight (TBA)
Luc-Marie Bayle	1914–2000	French naval officer, painter, and artist	TBA
François Achille Bazaine	1811–1888	French Army officer, who obtained the rank of Marshal of France (1863). On 22 July 1835, he was wounded in the battle of Macta (French: la Macta) of fires to the wrist, received a knight rank of France's Legion of Honour. On 9 November 1845, he was promoted to the rank of Officer, following the combat of Sidi Kafir. On 2 July 1863, his rank was upgraded to a Grand Cross. He received a citation at the battle of San Lorenzo	Knight (decree: 22 July 1835); Officer (decree: 9 November 1845); Commander (decree: 16 August 1856); Grand Officer (TBA); Grand Cross (decree: 2 July 1863)
Pierre-Dominique (Adolphe) Bazaine known as Adolphe Bazaine-Vasseur	1809–1893	French railway engineer	Knight (decree: 15 April 1841); Officer (decree: 5 August 1861)
Pierre-Dominique Bazaine	1786–1838	French mathematician and engineer	Knight (decree: 1 May 1821); Officer (decree: 24 July 1826); Commander (TBA)
George Albert Bazaine-Hayter	1843–1914	French General. By decree on 9 September 1870 he received the Knight for acts of war during the battles of Metz. During his command of the 12th regiment at Lạng Sơn, Tonkin (North Vietnam), he was upgraded to the rank of Officer by decree on 4 May 1889. On 9 April 1903, he was called to head the 57th Infantry Brigade in to defend the Nice group, and had his rank promoted to Commander on 3 September 1903. At the end of his career, just before being placed in the reserve section (4 December 1908), he was awarded the title of Grand Officer on 3 December 1908.	Knight (09 September 1870); Officer (04 May 1889); Commander (03 September 1903); Grand Officer (3 December 1908)
Paul Bazelaire			
Cecil Beaton			
Gérald Beaudoin			
Roger Beaufrand			
Thomas Beecham			
Azouz Begag			
Reginald R. Belknap	1871–1959	United States Navy rear admiral	
Alexander Graham Bell			
Sir Francis Dillon Bell		New Zealand statesman	
Jean-Louis Bélard			
Monica Bellucci	1964	Italian actress and model. In recognition of her cultural achievement in France.	Knight (24 November 2016)
Jean-Paul Belmondo	1933–2021		
Guillermo B. Belt	1906–1989	Cuban diplomat	
Arnaud Beltrame		Gendarme Colonel, Gendarmerie National (award and promotion both posthumous)	TBA (2018)
Charles Bequignon			
Józef Bem			
Edvard Beneš			
Jean-Joseph Benjamin-Constant			
François-Nicolas-Benoît Haxo			
Jean Béraud			
Henri Bergson			
Jean Berlie			
Louis Bernacchi			
Claude Bernard		Physiologist, founding father of modern physiology and endocrinology	
Dominique Bernard		School teacher killed in Arras school stabbing by an Islamic terrorist in 2023	
Tom Bernard		Co-president and co-founder of Sony Pictures Classics	
Étienne-Prosper Berne-Bellecour			
Sarah Bernhardt			
Prince Bernhard of Lippe-Biesterfeld			
Pier Luigi Bersani			
Louis-Alexandre Berthier			
Pierre Berthier			
Roberte Ponsonby, Countess of Bessborough			
Jean-Baptiste Bessières			
Ramón Emeterio Betances	1827–1898	Puerto Rican medical doctor, political leader and diplomat	
Íngrid Betancourt			
André Bettencourt			
Jacques Claude Beugnot			
Bhumibol Adulyadej		King of Thailand	
Marthe Bibesco			
Marcel Bigeard			
Kenneth W. Bilby		American businessman and author	
Carl Bildt			
Pierre Billotte			
Émile Bin			
Maria Ilva Biolcati		Italian singer and actress	
Wilfred Bion			
Sir Robert Bird, 2nd Baronet			
George Birdwood			
Billy Bishop			
Harry Gore Bishop			
Monique de Bissy			
Henri Biva	1848–1929	French painter	Knight (1900)
George G. Blackburn			
Alice Guy-Blaché		Cinema pioneer	
Sergent Blandan			
Tasker H. Bliss			
Denise Bloch			
Marc Bloch			
Susan Blumenthal		Leader in global health, women's health, and the fight against cancer.	Knight (2025)
Marc Boegner			
Jean-Bédel Bokassa			
Albina du Boisrouvray			
Petar Bojović			
Claude Bolling			
Kathryne Bomberger			
Marie-Claude Bomsel			
Napoleon Bonaparte		Founder of the Légion d'honneur	
Louis Napoleon Bonaparte (Napoleon VI)			Knight (TBA); Officer (8 October 1980); Commander (12 December 1977)
Bono			
Jorge Luis Borges			
Frank Borland			
Władysław Bortnowski			
Alfred Bossom			
Lucien Bouchard			
Georges Ernest Boulanger			
Gustave Boulanger			TBA (1868)
Pierre Boulle			
Jean-Gustave Bourbouze			
Antoine Bourseiller			
Paul-Émile Boutigny		Painter of military subjects	
Victor Boutilly	1864–1934	French forestry inspector	TBA (1911)
Frank Henry Bowater			
Maurice Bowra			
Charles Boyer			
Tadeusz Boy-Żeleński			
Ali Bozer			
Olga Boznańska			
Benjamin Crowninshield Bradlee		Vice President At-Large of The Washington Post	
Jean Branger		Captain, 8th infantry regiment	Knight (26 December 1852)
Lloyd Samuel Breadner			
Théophile Marie Brébant			
Yves Bréchet			
Jeremy Brett	1933-1995	Actor, known as the definitive Sherlock Holmes	Knight (April,1994)
Annie Brewer			
Francis Charles Bridgeman Bridgeman			
Louis Brière de l'Isle		General, Troupes de marine	
Donald F. Breitenberg		USA World War II, 101st Airborne	
Louis de Broglie			
Louis Bromfield			
Robert S. Brookings			
Romaine Brooks			
Albert Bros		Escaped pow and member of the Resistance	
Daniel Brottier			
John Nicholas Brown II		Philanthropist	
Margaret Brown			
Josip Broz Tito		Leader of Yugoslavia	
John Bruce Lockhart		Scotland, Great War	
Angélique Brûlon			
Gabriel Brunet de Sairigné			
Charles F. Bruns			
Michael Bruxner			
Frank Buckles			
Jean-Eugène Buland		French painter	
Eugene Bullard			
Omar Bundy		American general	
Joseph Richard Burke		Canadian Army, WWII veteran, dispatch rider with the Toronto Scottish Regiment	Knight (8 August 2015)
Richard Burrows		Chairman of British American Tobacco	
Robert Busnel			
Stephen Butcher			
Richard E. Byrd		American admiral and explorer	
Myles Byrne			

== See also ==
- Legion of Honour
- List of Legion of Honour recipients by name
- List of foreign recipients of Legion of Honour by name
- List of foreign recipients of the Legion of Honour by country
- List of British recipients of the Legion of Honour for the Crimean War
- Legion of Honour Museum
- Ribbons of the French military and civil awards
- War Cross (France)
