= Yurino =

Yurino (Russian: Юрино) is the name of several inhabited localities in Russia.

== Ivanovo Oblast ==
As of 2010, two rural localities in Ivanovo Oblast bear this name:

- Yurino, Verkhnelandekhovsky District, Ivanovo Oblast, a village in Verkhnelandekhovsky District
- Yurino, Vichugsky District, Ivanovo Oblast, a village in Vichugsky District

== Kaluga Oblast ==
As of 2010, one rural locality in Kaluga Oblast bears this name:

- Yurino, Kaluga Oblast, a village in Kozelsky District

== Kirov Oblast ==
As of 2010, one rural locality in Kirov Oblast bears this name:

- Yurino, Kirov Oblast, a village in Kichminsky Rural Okrug of Sovetsky District

== Kostroma Oblast ==
As of 2010, two rural localities in Kostroma Oblast bear this name:

- Yurino, Kologrivsky District, Kostroma Oblast, a village in Ilyinskoye Settlement of Kologrivsky District
- Yurino, Krasnoselsky District, Kostroma Oblast, a village in Sidorovskoye Settlement of Krasnoselsky District

== Mari El Republic ==
As of 2010, one urban locality in the Mari El Republic bears this name:

- Yurino, Mari El Republic, an urban-type settlement in Yurinsky District

== Moscow Oblast ==
As of 2010, one rural locality in Moscow Oblast bears this name:

- Yurino, Moscow Oblast, a village in Kvashenkovskoye Rural Settlement of Taldomsky District

== Nizhny Novgorod Oblast ==
As of 2010, two rural localities in Nizhny Novgorod Oblast bear this name:

- Yurino, Bor, Nizhny Novgorod Oblast, a village in Lindovsky Selsoviet under the administrative jurisdiction of the town of oblast significance of Bor
- Yurino, Balakhninsky District, Nizhny Novgorod Oblast, a village in Konevsky Selsoviet of Balakhninsky District

== Novgorod Oblast ==
As of 2010, one rural locality in Novgorod Oblast bears this name:

- Yurino, Novgorod Oblast, a village in Progresskoye Settlement of Borovichsky District

== Pskov Oblast ==
As of 2010, three rural localities in Pskov Oblast bear this name:

- Yurino, Opochetsky District, Pskov Oblast, a village in Opochetsky District
- Yurino, Ostrovsky District, Pskov Oblast, a village in Ostrovsky District
- Yurino, Porkhovsky District, Pskov Oblast, a village in Porkhovsky District

== Ryazan Oblast ==
As of 2010, one rural locality in Ryazan Oblast bears this name:

- Yurino, Ryazan Oblast, a selo in Kaverinsky Rural Okrug of Shatsky District

== Smolensk Oblast ==
As of 2010, three rural localities in Smolensk Oblast bear this name:

- Yurino, Gagarinsky District, Smolensk Oblast, a village in Gagarinskoye Rural Settlement of Gagarinsky District
- Yurino, Tyomkinsky District, Smolensk Oblast, a village in Batyushkovskoye Rural Settlement of Tyomkinsky District
- Yurino, Vyazemsky District, Smolensk Oblast, a village in Kaydakovskoye Rural Settlement of Vyazemsky District

== Tver Oblast ==
As of 2010, three rural localities in Tver Oblast bear this name:

- Yurino, Kashinsky District, Tver Oblast, a village in Pestrikovskoye Rural Settlement of Kashinsky District
- Yurino, Kimrsky District, Tver Oblast, a village in Tsentralnoye Rural Settlement of Kimrsky District
- Yurino, Zubtsovsky District, Tver Oblast, a village in Stolipinskoye Rural Settlement of Zubtsovsky District

== Udmurt Republic ==
As of 2010, one rural locality in the Udmurt Republic bears this name:

- Yurino, Udmurt Republic, a village in Yurinsky Selsoviet of Sarapulsky District

== Vladimir Oblast ==
As of 2010, three rural localities in Vladimir Oblast bear this name:

- Yurino, Kovrovsky District, Vladimir Oblast, a village in Kovrovsky District
- Yurino (Cherkutinskoye Rural Settlement), Sobinsky District, Vladimir Oblast, a village in Sobinsky District; municipally, a part of Cherkutinskoye Rural Settlement of that district
- Yurino (Vorshinskoye Rural Settlement), Sobinsky District, Vladimir Oblast, a village in Sobinsky District; municipally, a part of Vorshinskoye Rural Settlement of that district

== Vologda Oblast ==
As of 2010, three rural localities in Vologda Oblast bear this name:

- Yurino, Paninsky Selsoviet, Belozersky District, Vologda Oblast, a village in Paninsky Selsoviet of Belozersky District
- Yurino, Sholsky Selsoviet, Belozersky District, Vologda Oblast, a village in Sholsky Selsoviet of Belozersky District
- Yurino, Kaduysky District, Vologda Oblast, a village in Velikoselsky Selsoviet of Kaduysky District

== Yaroslavl Oblast ==
As of 2010, six rural localities in Yaroslavl Oblast bear this name:

- Yurino, Danilovsky District, Yaroslavl Oblast, a village in Slobodskoy Rural Okrug of Danilovsky District
- Yurino, Pereslavsky District, Yaroslavl Oblast, a village in Glebovsky Rural Okrug of Pereslavsky District
- Yurino, Glebovsky Rural Okrug, Rybinsky District, Yaroslavl Oblast, a village in Glebovsky Rural Okrug of Rybinsky District
- Yurino, Makarovsky Rural Okrug, Rybinsky District, Yaroslavl Oblast, a village in Makarovsky Rural Okrug of Rybinsky District
- Yurino, Uglichsky District, Yaroslavl Oblast, a village in Otradnovsky Rural Okrug of Uglichsky District
- Yurino, Yaroslavsky District, Yaroslavl Oblast, a village in Kurbsky Rural Okrug of Yaroslavsky District
