= Butcher (disambiguation) =

A butcher is a skilled tradesperson that prepares and retails meat.

Butcher, The Butcher, Butchers, or Butcher's may also refer to:

== Arts and entertainment ==
=== Film and television ===
- Butchers (film), a 2020 American horror film
- The Butcher (2006 film), an American horror film
- The Butcher (2007 film), a South Korean horror film
- The Butcher (2009 film), an American action film
- The Butcher (TV series), a 2019 butchering reality competition show
- The Butchers (film), a 2014 American horror film
- Butchers (film), a 2020 Canadian slasher film
- Le Boucher (The Butcher), a 1970 French psychological thriller film
- Butcher's Film Service, a British film production and distribution company

=== Gaming ===
- Butcher (video game), 2016

=== Music ===
- "The Butcher" (song), by Radiohead, 2011
- Butcher Bros., American record producers
- "Butcher", a song by Swans from the 1984 album Cop

== Geographic features ==
- Butcher Inlet, or Butcher's Inlet, on which Cossack, Western Australia is situated
- Butcher Island, off the coast of Mumbai, India
- Butcher Nunatak, Marie Byrd Land, Antarctica
- Butcher Ridge, Oates Land, Antarctica
- Butchers Knob, part of Cooper Mountain, West Virginia, US
- Butchers Lake, Victoria, Australia
- Butchers Spur, Ross Dependency, Antarctica

== People ==
- Butcher (surname), including a list of people and fictional characters with the surname
- Butcher (nickname), including a list of people and fictional characters with the nickname or epithet
- Butcher baronets, two extinct titles in the Baronetage of the United Kingdom

== Other uses ==
- Porvoo Butchers, an American football team from Porvoo, Finland
- Shankill Butchers, an Ulster loyalist gang 1975–1982
- Butcher, a small beer glass in South Australia
