= Mike Butcher =

Mike Butcher may refer to:

- Mike Butcher (baseball), American baseball pitcher and coach
- Mike Butcher (footballer), Australian rules footballer
- Mike Butcher (journalist), journalist and editor
