= Stephen Butcher =

Stephen Butcher may refer to:

- Stephen Butcher (cricketer) (c.1765–?), English cricketer; a top-class bowler from 1787 to 1793
- Stephen Butcher (Royal Marine) (1904–2005), English serviceman; one of UK's last 11 veterans of World War I
- Stephen Butcher (director) (born 1946), English television director of Eastenders
- Stephen Butcher (Sudbury) (born 1953), Canadian politician
- Stephen Butcher (footballer) (born 1994), English footballer

== See also ==
- Butcher (disambiguation)
