= Jean Boucher =

Jean Boucher may refer to:

- Jean Boucher (artist) (1870–1939), French sculptor
- Jean Boucher (politician) (1926–2011), member of the Canadian House of Commons
- Jean Boucher (MNA) (active since 2014), Canadian politician in Quebec

== See also ==
- Georges Mounin (1910–1993), French linguist who sometimes wrote under the name 'Jean Boucher'
