= Martin Butcher =

English cricketer

Personal information
- Full name: Martin Simon Butcher
- Born: 17 May 1958 (age 68); Thornton Heath, Surrey, England
- Batting: Right-handed
- Relatives: Alan Butcher (brother); Ian Butcher (brother); Gary Butcher (nephew); Mark Butcher (nephew)

Domestic team information
- Years: Team
- 1982: Surrey

Career statistics
Competition	First-class
Matches	1
Runs scored	–
Batting average	–
100s/50s	–
Top score	–
Balls bowled	6
Wickets	0
Bowling average	–
5 wickets in innings	–
10 wickets in match	–
Best bowling	–
Catches/stumpings	1/–
- Source: Cricinfo, 26 August 2012

Martin Simon Butcher (born 19 May 1958) is a former English cricketer. He was a right-handed batsman. He was born at Thornton Heath, Surrey.

Butcher made a single first-class appearance for Surrey against Oxford University at the University Parks in 1982. He wasn't required to bat during the match, while with the ball he bowled one wicketless overs, with the match ending in a draw. This was his only major appearance for Surrey.

Butcher comes from a large extended family of cricketers. His brother, Alan, and nephew, Mark, both played Test cricket for England. His other brother, Ian, and nephew, Gary, both played first-class cricket. His niece, Bryony, has played women's cricket to a high level domestically.
