= Butcher (nickname) =

When used as an epithet or nickname, Butcher or The Butcher may refer to:

== People known by the epithet ==
- Butcher of Amritsar: Reginald Dyer (1864–1927), British Indian Army officer responsible for the 1919 Jallianwala Bagh massacre
- Butcher of Baghdad: Saddam Hussein (1937–2006), President of Iraq known for a prolonged, systemic regime of state terror and purges
- Butcher of the Balkans (disambiguation), several people
- Butcher of Balochistan and Butcher of Bengal: Tikka Khan (1915–2002), Pakistan Army four-star general and first Chief of Staff
- Butcher of Bega: Graeme Stephen Reeves (born 1949), Australian deregistered gynecologist and obstetrician
- Butcher of Beijing: Li Peng (李鹏; 1928–2019) top level Chinese Communist Party official known for supporting the use of violence against the Tiananmen Square Protests
- Butcher of Beirut: Ariel Sharon (1928–2014), then Israeli defense minister associated with the 1982 Sabra and Shatila massacre
- Butcher of Belgrade: Slobodan Milošević (1941-2006), President of Serbia and Yugoslavia known for playing a major role in the Yugoslav Wars and overseeing an oppressive regime that consisted of electoral fraud, political assassinations, suppression of press freedom, and police brutality
- Butcher of Bosnia:
  - Ratko Mladić (1943–2026), Bosnian Serb former general and Chief of Staff of the Army of Republika Srpska
  - Radovan Karadžić (born 1945), Bosnian Serb former politician and President of Republika Srpska
- Butcher of Budapest: Yuri Andropov (1914-1984), Leader of the Soviet Union and former Chairman of the KGB, at the time was Ambassador to Hungary and took a major part in suppressing the 1956 Hungarian Uprising
- Butcher of La Cabaña: Che Guevara (1928–1967), Argentine Marxist revolutionary, physician, author, guerrilla leader, diplomat and military theorist
- Butcher of Cesena: Antipope Clement VII (1342–1394)
- Butcher of Chechnya:
  - Vladimir Putin, President of Russia
  - Vladimir Shamanov, Russian politician, senior commander of the Ground Forces during the First Chechen War
- Butcher of Congo: King Leopold II of Belgium
- Bucther of Damascus: Bashar al-Assad (born 1965), President of Syria characterized by systemic state violence during the Syrian civil war
- Butcher of Drogheda: Oliver Cromwell (1599–1658), Commonwealth military and political leader
- Butcher of Eastern Visayas: Jovito Palparan (born 1950), Filipino fugitive, politician and former army general
- Butcher of England: John Tiptoft, 1st Earl of Worcester (1427-1470), English nobleman
- Butcher of Hama: Rifaat al-Assad (1937-2026), Syrian military officer and politician
- Butcher of Kentucky: Stephen G. Burbridge (1831–1894), Union major general during the American Civil War
- Butcher of Khan Younis: Yahya Sinwar (1962–2024), Hamas leader linked to killings of suspect collaborators
- Butcher of Kurdistan: Ali Hassan al-Majid (1941–2010), Iraqi Defense Minister, Interior Minister, military commander and chief of the Iraqi Intelligence Service, better known as "Chemical Ali"
- Butcher of Mirpur: Abdul Quader Molla (1948–2013), Bangladeshi Islamist leader and politician
- Butcher of Rangoon: Sein Lwin (1923–2004), Burmese brigadier general and briefly President of Myanmar (Burma)
- Butcher of Samar: Littleton Waller (1856–1926), US Marine Corps officer
- Butcher of the Somme: Douglas Haig, 1st Earl Haig (1861–1928), British First World War field marshal
- Butcher of the Syria: Aleksandr Dvornikov (born 1961), Russian army general
- Butcher of Uganda: Idi Amin (c. 1925–2003), President of Uganda and major general

=== Nazi officials and officers ===
- Butcher of Genoa: Friedrich Engel (1909–2006)
- Butcher of Lyon: Klaus Barbie (1913–1991), World War II SS-Hauptsturmführer and Gestapo member
- Butcher of Prague: Reinhard Heydrich (1904–1942), German World War II Nazi official and one of the main architects of the Holocaust
- Butcher of Riga: Eduard Roschmann (1908–1977), Austrian SS officer and commandant of the Riga ghetto during 1943
- Butcher of Warsaw:
  - Josef Albert Meisinger (1899–1947), German SS officer
  - Heinz Reinefarth (1903–1979), German SS officer

=== Serial killers ===
- Butcher of Hanover: Fritz Haarmann (1879–1925), German serial killer
- Butcher of Plainfield: Ed Gein (1906–1984), American serial killer
- Butcher of Rostov: Andrei Chikatilo (1936–1994), Soviet serial killer

== People with the nickname ==
- Imre Arakas, Estonian criminal known as "The Butcher"
- Prince William, Duke of Cumberland (1721–1765), son of King George II of Great Britain and general known to his political enemies as "Butcher" Cumberland
- John Ronald Brown (1922–2010), American surgeon convicted of second-degree murder after operating without a license
- The Butcher Brothers, alter-egos of American film directors Mitchell Altieri and Phil Flores
- Edward Cummiskey (died 1976), New York City mobster known as "The Butcher"
- Robert Hansen (died 2014), an American serial killer, nicknamed the Butcher Baker
- Sir Arthur Harris, 1st Baronet (1892–1984), Marshal of the Royal Air Force during the Second World War
- Lisandro Martínez (born 1998), Argentine footballer, "The Butcher" or "Butcher of Amsterdam" when playing for Ajax Amsterdam
- Andrew Mrotek (born 1983), "the Butcher", American drummer for the band The Academy Is...
- William Poole (1821–1855), leader of the New York City gang the Bowery Boys, bare-knuckle boxer, and a leader of the Know Nothing political movement, known as "Bill the Butcher"
- Ivan Serov (1905–1990), Soviet intelligence officer and first chairman of the KGB, called "The Butcher" by British media.
- Archie Skym (1906–1970), Welsh rugby union footballer
- Valeriano Weyler, 1st Duke of Rubí (1838–1930), Spanish general and Governor General of the Philippines and Cuba
- Andoni Goikoetxea (born 1956), Spanish footballer, "The Butcher of Bilbao"
- Pompey, nicknamed adulescentulus carnifex (Latin, 'Teenage Butcher'), Roman general and statesman

== Wrestlers with the ring name ==
- The Butcher (Brutus Beefcake, born 1957), ring name of professional wrestler Edward Leslie
- Abdullah the Butcher, ring name of professional wrestler Larry Shreve (born 1941)
- "Butcher", a ring name of former professional wrestler Paul Vachon (1938-2024)
- The Butcher, ring name of professional wrestler Andy Williams (1977-2026)
- Necro Butcher, ring name of American professional wrestler Dylan Keith Summers (born 1973)

== Fictional characters ==
- Billy Butcher, nicknamed "The Butcher" (The Boys)
- Butcher of Arlav: Biff Simpson (Hunters)
- Butcher of Bakersfield: Benjamin "Ben" Richards (The Running Man)
- Butcher of Blaviken: Geralt of Rivia (The Witcher)
- Butcher of Bogon: Ratchet (Ratchet & Clank)
- Butcher of Skull Moon: The Doctor (Doctor Who)
- Butcher of Stilwater: The Protagonist/The Boss/"Playa" (Saints Row)
- Butcher of Torfan: Commander Shepard (Mass Effect)
- Butcher of White Orchard: Geralt of Rivia (The Witcher)
- The Butcher (American Horror Story), from the TV series American Horror Story: Roanoke
- The Butcher, a monster in the video game Silent Hill: Origins
- The Butcher, a physical embodiment of "rage" that powers the Red Lantern Corps in the DC Comics universe

== See also ==
- Butcher (disambiguation)
  - Butcher
  - Butcher (surname)
