= Buchter =

Buchter is a surname. Notable people with the surname include:

- Ryan Buchter (born 1987), American baseball player
- Tineke Buchter, better known as Tina Strobos (1920–2012), Dutch psychiatrist who rescued Jews during the Holocaust

== See also ==
- Butcher (surname)
