= Fleischhauer =

Fleischhauer is a German surname. The English equivalent is 'Butcher'.. Notable people with the surname include:

- Anna Fleischhauer (born 1987), German journalist
- Carl-August Fleischhauer (1930–2005), German judge
- Georg Fleischhauer (born 1988), German hurdler
- Günter Fleischhauer (1928–2002), German musicologist
- Jan Fleischhauer (born 1962), German journalist and author
- Ulrich Fleischhauer (1876–1960), Nazi propagandist
