= Boutillier =

Boutillier is a French surname. Notable people with the surname include:

- Arthur Moren Boutillier (1869–1955), Canadian politician
- Rémi Boutillier (born 1990), French tennis player
- Thomas Boutillier (1797–1861), Canadian doctor and politician

== See also ==
- Boutilier, surname
- Le Boutillier, surname
