= Le Boutillier =

Le Boutillier, Lebouthillier or LeBoutillier are French surnames. Notable people with the surnames include:

- David Le Boutillier (1811–1854), Canadian political figure
- Diane Lebouthillier (born 1959), Canadian politician
- John Le Boutillier (1797–1872), Canadian businessman and political figure
- John LeBoutillier (born 1953), American political columnist and pundit
- Peter Leboutillier (born 1975), former Canadian ice hockey player
- Thomas LeBoutillier (1879–1929), American sports shooter
- Oliver Colin LeBoutillier (1894–1983), American pilot
- William Le Boutillier Fauvel (1850–1897), Canadian politician

== See also ==
- Boutilier, surname
- Boutillier, surname
- Leboucher, surname
