= John Butcher =

John Butcher may refer to:

- John Butcher (musician) (born 1954), British saxophonist
- John Butcher (Australian footballer) (born 1991), Australian rules footballer with the Port Adelaide Football Club
- John Butcher, 1st Baron Danesfort (1853–1935), British lawyer
- John C. Butcher (born 1933), New Zealand mathematician
- John Butcher (British politician) (1946–2006), Conservative MP for Coventry South-West 1979–1997
- John Butcher (baseball) (born 1957), former Major League Baseball player
- John Butcher (English footballer) (born 1956), English association football goalkeeper who played for Blackburn

== See also ==
- Jon Butcher (born 1955), American singer and guitarist
- Butcher (surname)
