= Jean-Gustave Bourbouze =

French engineer

- Born: 1825; France
- Died: 1889 (aged 63–64); France
- Occupations: engineer, manufacturer and teacher

Jean Gustave Bourbouze (Paris, September 7, 1825 - September 23, 1889) was a French engineer, manufacturer of precision instruments and a teacher of technical education.

== Early life and education ==
Jean Gustave Bourbouze began as a simple mechanic. He was chosen by the professors Claude Pouillet and César Despretz to succeed Jean Thiébault Silbermann as a physics and curator of the physics in the Faculty of Science of Paris in 1849. He then became the collaborator of several physicists, including Léon Foucault, with whom he prepared in 1851 the pendulum in the Pantheon. In 1855, he received an electric shock by manipulating the 750-element Bunsen cell used at the Sorbonne by César Despretz for his experiments on the synthesis of diamond.

Beginning in 1867, he took part in the faculty for the creation of the Jules Jamin laboratory for the physical research of the Faculty of Sciences of Paris. In 1870, he proposed to carry out a telegraphic link by river sending strong currents into the Seine from generators behind the lines of the Prussian army and receiving the residual current in Paris by means of very sensitive galvanometers. The tests were carried out with great difficulty due in particular to the very severe winter, with Paul Desains thanks to the financing of Marcellin Berthelot. During this same siege, he organized the electric lighting of the city of Paris and was therefore named Knight of the Legion of Honor by decree of December 31, 1872 rendered on the report of the Minister of War.

== The Curie brothers ==
Just before leaving the role of preparer, Bourbouze noticed a young student, Pierre Curie who was preparing his Bachelor of Science degree in the Faculty of Science. He then took him as assistant to the preparation of François Leroux's physics course at the Ecole Supérieure de Pharmacie de Paris. Bourbouze also met Jacques Curie who succeeded him at the Ecole Supérieure de Pharmacie de Paris. In 1886, Bourbouze was the builder of an electrometer and an apparatus for the study of the piezoelectric quartz invited by the Curie brothers. He also developed at the end of his life a process of welding aluminum (patent June 6, 1884), with an aluminum-tin alloy, the study of which was continued by his widow.

== Manufacture of instruments ==
Jean Gustave Bourbouze manufactures several instruments during his career in France. He used them for research and teaching.

=== Instruments manufactured by Bourbouze ===
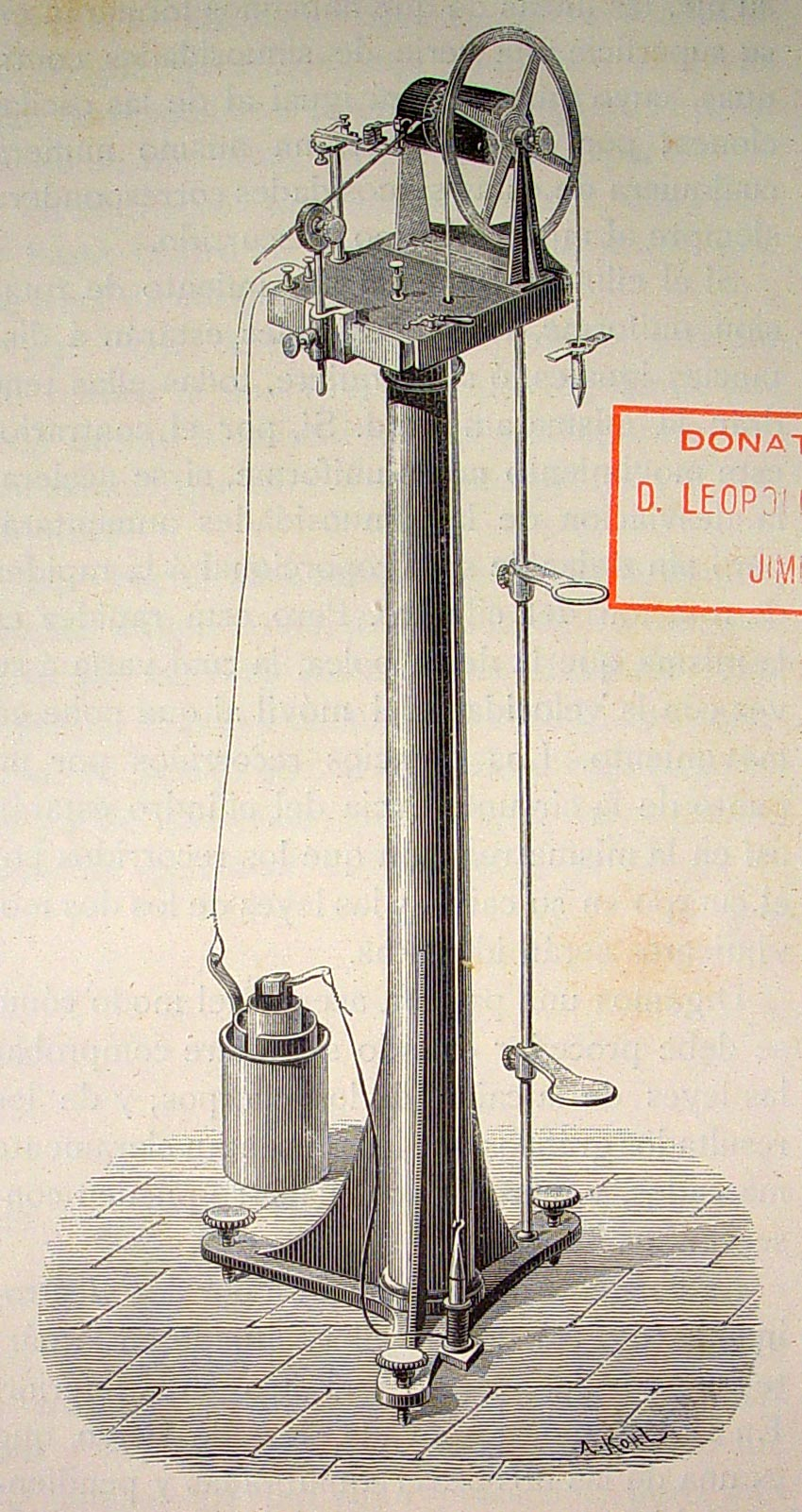
Equipment for measuring the free fall

Some of the instruments manufactured by Bourbouze are as follows:

- Vertical galvanometer
- Equipment for measuring the free fall
- Hygrometer with mirror and hygrometer for condensation
- System of mobile projection

== Laboratories of Bourbouze ==
Jean-Gustave Bourbouze had acquired a great reputation: "There are very few current physicists who have not known M. Bourbouze either at the Sorbonne, where he was for a long time preparing the course Of physics, or in the course of experimental physics that he had installed in his home.".

One of his pupils, Charles-Jérémie Hemardinquer, a student at the Faculty of Sciences, collected the notes left to his death by Bourbouze and collected by his widow, notes in which he had written about operating modes for the classes that he made free on his Sunday. In 1895, he published a work entitled "Modes opératoires de physique" by Gabriel Lippmann, who had known Bourbouze when he was a student, like "Modest and learned man, model preparer and skilled builder at the same time as inventor engineer".

In the school year 1895-96, 80 pupils attended the courses. In 1899-1900 there were 320 pupils. In 1908, the teaching sessions of Laboratoires Bourbouze welcomed 150 students divided into eight sections: general physics, optics, electricity, analytical chemistry, industrial chemistry, photography, micrography and metallurgy.

An association of pupils and former students of the Bourbouze laboratories is created, an association which publishes the journal l'Actualité scientifique: a monthly journal of pure and applied sciences.

== Training laboratory technicians ==
In 1909 Charles-Jérémie Hemardinquer created the Scientia Technical School, in the form of a limited company, at 23 rue François-Gérard, which will train laboratory technicians. and new premises for the Bourbouze laboratories were inaugurated in 1911 at 40 rue des Allouettes.

== See also ==
- Pierre Curie
- List of Légion d'honneur recipients by name (B)
