= Basile Baltus de Pouilly =

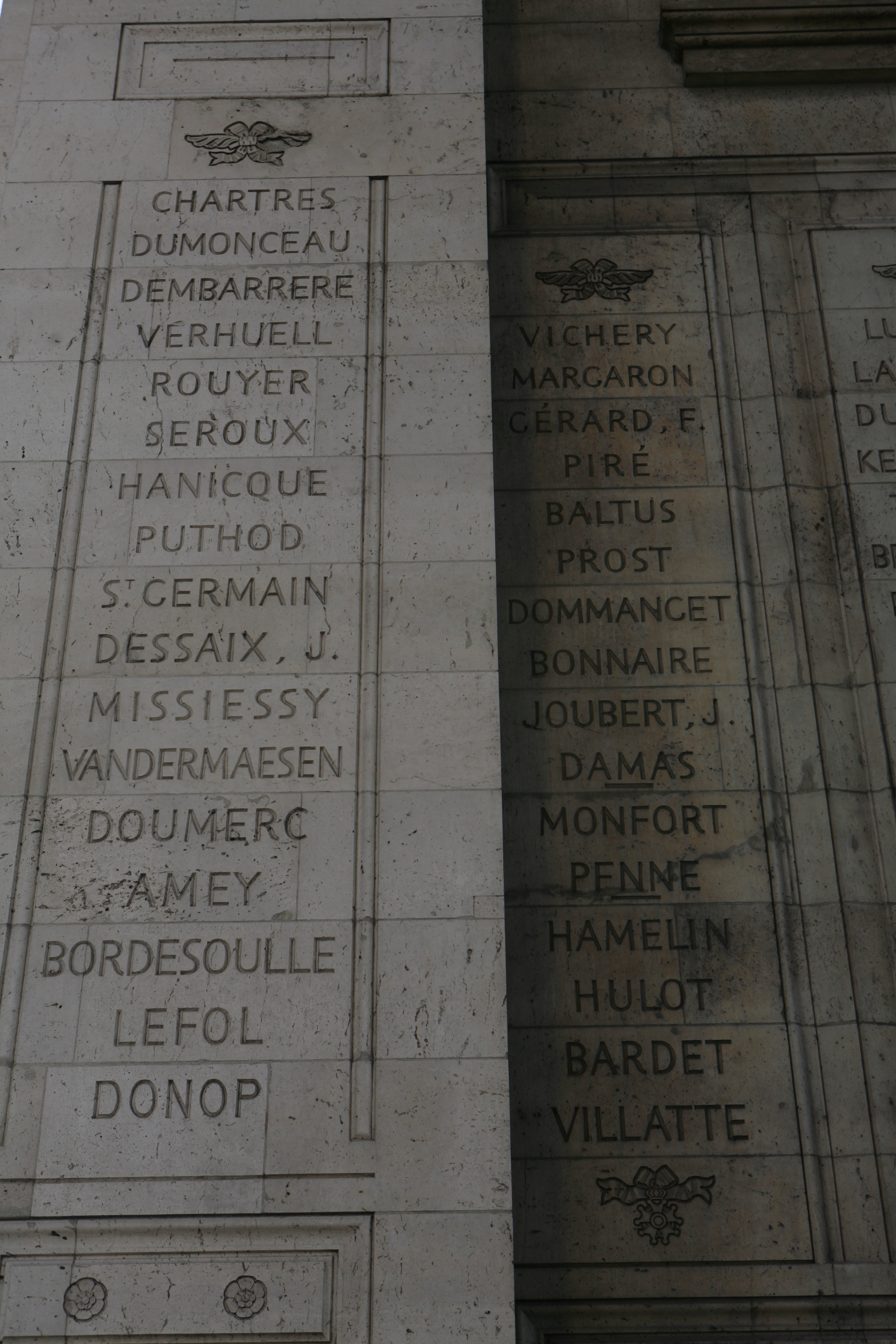
- Baltus's name is inscribed under the Arc de Triomphe: northern pillar, column two.
- Born: 2 January 1766; Metz
- Died: 13 January 1845 (aged 79)

Basile Guy Marie Victor Baltus de Pouilly (French pronunciation: [bazil ɡi maʁi viktɔʁ baltys də puji]; 2 January 1766 – 13 January 1845) was a French general during the French Revolutionary Wars and the Napoleonic Wars.

== Life ==
Basile Baltus de Pouilly was born in Metz. He was first a pupil of artillery in August 1780, second lieutenant in the regiment of La Fere in July 1781, captain in April 1791, and then a squadron leader in the 1st regiment of light artillery. Baltus was promoted to colonel in March 1806, Baron of the Empire in January 1809, and finally Brigadier General in March 1811. Baltus commanded the artillery in Hamburg (see Siege of Hamburg). In 1815, during the Hundred Days, he commanded the IV Corps Reserve Artillery and was present at the meeting on the morning of 17 June, when Marshal Grouchy decided to proceed to Wavre rather than towards the cannon fire coming from the Battle of Waterloo. He was retired on 1 January 1816 according to the order of 1 August 1815. Baltus finally left the army 9 December 1826, with the rank of lieutenant general.

General Basile Baltus de Pouilly was one of 558 officers of the First Empire whose name is engraved on the Arc de Triomphe. His name appears on the second column.

== Distinctions ==
- France's Legion of Honour
- Legion of Honour – Knight (14 June 1804)
- Legion of Honour - Officer (26 December 1805)
- Legion of Honour - Commander (11 July 1807)
- Knight of the Order of Saint Louis: (July 1814).
- Knight of the Military Order of St. Henry (Saxony)
- Knight of the Order of the Sword

== See also ==
- Legion of Honour
- Legion of Honour Museum
- List of Legion of Honour recipients by name (B)
- Ribbons of the French military and civil awards
