= Jean Baubérot =

French historian and sociologist

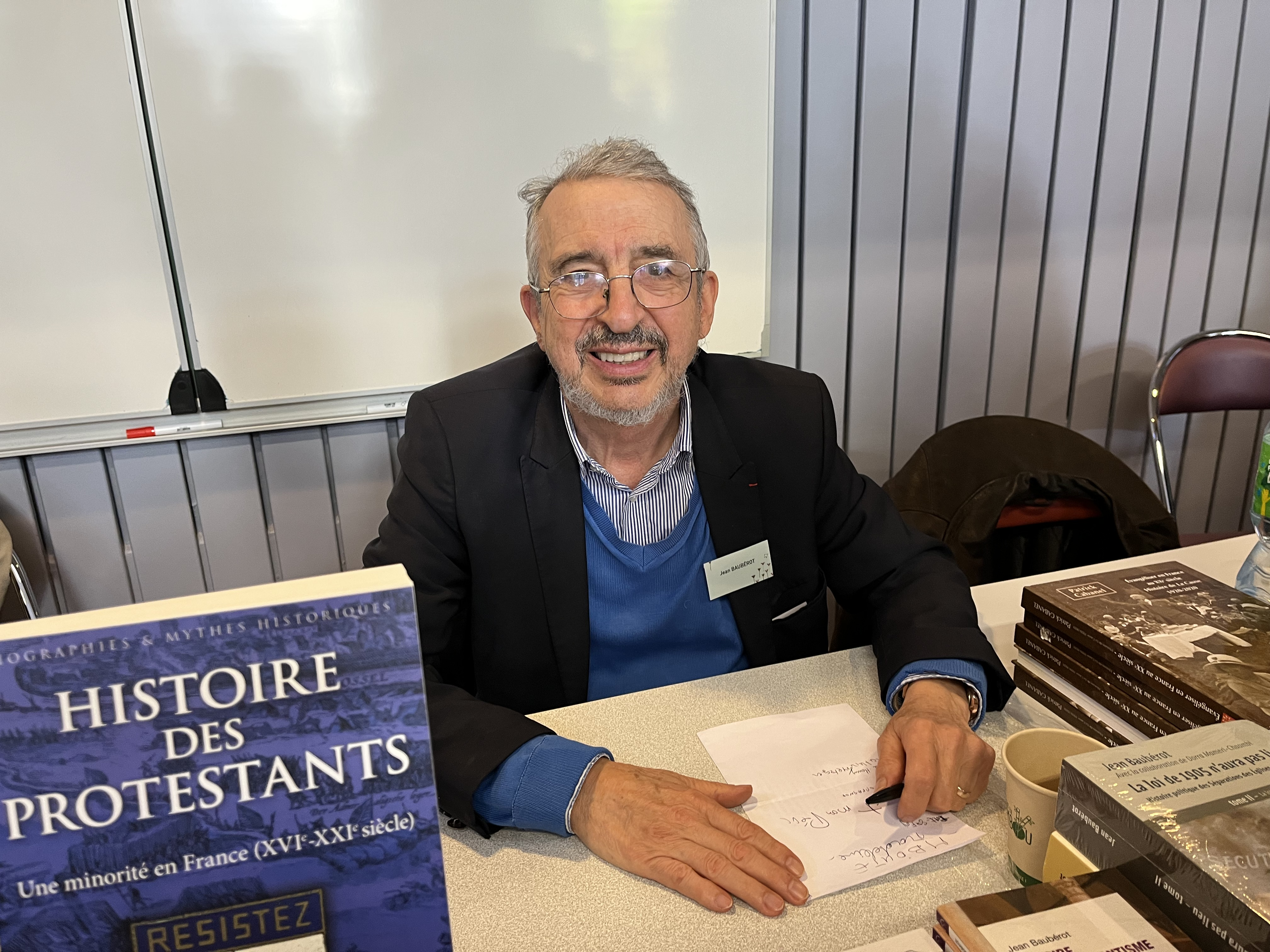
Jean Baubérot

Jean Baubérot (French: [ʒɑ̃ bobɛʁo]; born 26 July 1941 in Châteauponsac, Haute-Vienne), is a French historian and sociologist specializing in sociology of religions. He is the founder of the sociology of secularism.

After holding the chair of "History and Sociology of Protestantism" (1978–1990), he held the chair of "History and Sociology of secularism "(since 1991) at the École pratique des hautes études, where he was the honorary president. He wrote twenty books, including a historical novel. He is coauthor of the Déclaration internationale sur la laïcité, signed by 250 scholars from 30 countries.

== Biography ==
Baubérot is the son of teachers. He attended his secondary education at the Lycée Gay-Lussac in Limoges. At the Paris-Sorbonne University, he was awarded doctor for history (under the direction of Jean-Marie Mayeur) for letters and human sciences, he graduated from the École pratique des hautes études (EPHE).

He started as technical contributor at the EPHE in 1967, then he became research assistant in 1971, then director of studies in 1978. He chaired the Section of Religious Sciences between 1986 and 1994. He was appointed Chairman of the School in 1999.

He founded in 1995 and directed in 2001 the Group of Sociology of religion and secularism (EPHE-CNRS). Between 1997 and 1998, he was appointed technical adviser to the cabinet of Ségolène Royal.

He was the sole member of the Stasi Commission to have abstained on the vote of the report which led to the development of the French law on secularity and conspicuous religious symbols in schools.

He is also a member of the Société internationale de sociologie de la religion (SISR) and chaired the Ernest Renan society in 1995 and 1996.

Baubérot was awarded a Knight in France's Legion of Honour

== Bibliography ==
- Un christianisme profane ? Royaume de Dieu, socialisme et modernité culturelle dans le périodique « chrétien-social » L'avant-garde (1899–1911), Paris, Presses universitaires de France (Bibliothèque de l'École des Hautes Études, Section des Sciences religieuses), 1978.
- La laïcité quel héritage ? De 1789 à nos jours, Genève, Labor and Fides ed., 1990.
- Vers un nouveau pacte laïque ?, Paris, Seuil ed., 1990.
- Pluralisme et minorités religieuses (Bibliothèque de l'École des Hautes Études, Section des Sciences religieuses), 1991 (direction).
- Religions et laïcité dans l'Europe des douze, Paris, Syros ed., 1994.
- 'La morale laïque contre l'ordre moral, Paris, Seuil, 1997.
- Histoire du protestantisme, Paris, PUF (Que sais-je ?), fifth edition, 1998.
- Une haine oubliée. L'antiprotestantisme avant le « pacte laïque » (1870–1905), with Valentine Zuber, Paris, Albin Michel (Sciences des religions), 2000.
- Religion, modernité et culture au Royaume-Uni et en France, 1800–1914, with Séverine Mathieu, Paris, Seuil (Points Histoire), 2002.
- La Laïcité à l'épreuve. Religions et Libertés dans le monde (collective work under the direction of Jean Baubérot), Encyclopædia Universalis, 2004.
- Le voile que cache-t-il ?, with Dounia Bouzar and Jacqueline Costa-Lascoux, L'Atelier, 2004.
- Laïcité 1905-2005, entre passion et raison, Seuil, 2004.
- De la séparation des Églises et de l'État à l'avenir de la laïcité, with Michel Wieviorka, Aube ed., 2005.
- Faut-il réviser la loi de 1905 ?, with Jean-Paul Scot, Christian Delacampagne, Henri Pena-Ruiz and René Rémond, Paris, PUF, 2005.
- Émile Combes et la princesse carmélite : Improbable amour, roman, Aube ed., 2005.
- L'intégrisme républicain contre la laïcité, Aube ed., 2006.
- Histoire de la laïcité en France, Paris, PUF (Que sais-je ?), fourth edition, 2007.
- Les Laïcités dans le monde, Paris, PUF (Que sais-je?), 2007
- Petite histoire du christianisme, Paris, Librio, 2008
- Relations églises et autorités outre-mer de 1945 à nos jours (collective work under the direction of Jean Baubérot), Indes Savantes ed., 2008.
- La laïcité expliquée à Nicolas Sarkozy et à ceux qui écrivent ses discours, Paris, Albin Michel, 2008
- Une laïcité interculturelle. Le Québec avenir de la France?, La Tour d'Aigle, L'Aube, 2008
- Sacrée médecine : Histoire et devenir d'un sanctuaire de la Raison, with Raphaël Liogier, Paris, Entrelacs, 2011.
- Laïcités sans frontières, with Micheline Milot, Seuil, 2011.
- La laïcité falsifiée, Paris, Éditions La Découverte, coll. « Cahiers libres », 2012, reissue with a new afterworld, 2014
- Une si vive révolte, preface Edwy Plenel, Éditions de l'Atelier, autobiography, 2014.
- Laïcité, laïcités. Reconfigurations et nouveaux défis (Afrique, Amériques, Europe, Japon, Pays arabes), with M. Milot and Ph. Portier, Maison des Sciences de l'Homme, 2014.
- Comment parler de la laïcité aux enfants, with Rokhaya Diallo, Éd Le Baron Perché, 2015
- Les sept laïcités françaises. Le modèle français de laïcité n'existe pas, Paris, Maison des Sciences de l'Homme, 2015 (ISBN 9782735119851)
- Histoire des Protestants. Une Minorité en France (XVIe-XXIe Siècle), avec Marianne Carbonnier-Burkard, Paris, Ellipses Marketing, 2016
- Petit Manuel pour une laïcité apaisée à l'usage des profs, des élèves et de leurs parents, withl "Le Cercle des Enseigants.e.s Laïques", Paris, la Découverte, 2016.
- Parlons laïcité en trente questions, with M. Milot, La Documentation française, Paris, 2017.
- La loi de 1905 n'aura pas lieu, volume 1, L'impossible loi de liberté (1902-1905), Paris, Maison des sciences de l'homme, 2019
- La Sécularisation en question. Religions et laïcités au prisme des sciences sociales, with Ph. Portier and J.-P. Willaime, Paris, Classiques Garnier, 2019..

Participation in collective works:

- "The Two Thresholds of Laïcization", in Bhargava Rajeev (ed.), Secularism and its critics, New Delhi, Oxford University Press, 1998, p. 94-136.
- "Laïcism", in Ritzer George (ed.), The Blackwell Encyclopedia of Sociologie, Volume V, Oxford, Blackwell Publishing, 2007, p. 2528-2533.
- "Current Issue in France", Hargreaves Alec (ed.), Politics and Religion in France and the United States, New-York, Lexington Books, 2007, p. 157-170.
- "The Evolution of Secularism in France: Between Two Civil Religions", in Cady Linell -Sharkman Hurd Elizabeth (ed.), Comparative Secularism in a Global Age, New-York, Palgrave macmillan, 2010.
- "Laicity", in Berenson Edward (ed.), The French Republic, history, values, debates, New-York, Cornell University Press, 2011, p. 125-137.
- "The Evolution of French Secularism" in Ghosh Ranjan, Making Sense of the Secular, Routledge, 2013, p. 44-55.
- "French Laïcité : What Does It Stand for?" (A Conversation with Sarath Fainberg)" and "Laïcité and Freedom of Conscience in Pluricultural France" in Berlinerblau Jacques (ed.), Secularism on the Edge. Rethinking Church-State Relations in the United States, France, and Israel, New-York, Palgrave macmillan, 2014, p. 85-94 and 103–112.

== See also ==
- 1905 French law on the Separation of the Churches and the State
- Legion of Honour
- Legion of Honour Museum
- List of Legion of Honour recipients by name (B)
- Ribbons of the French military and civil awards
