= Leboucher =

Leboucher is a surname of French origin.

== People with the surname ==
- Albert Leboucher (1888–1954), Tahitian businessman and politician
- Élise Leboucher (born 1982), French politician
- Michel Leboucher (born 1956), French Polynesian politician
- Laurence Leboucher (born 1972 ), French cyclist
- Leboucher, witness of the execution of Louis XVI
- Louis Leboucher (1910–1993), French linguist, translator and semiotician
- Pierre Leboucher (born 1980), French sailor

== See also ==
- Le Boucher, 1970 film
- Le Boutillier
