= Ian Butcher =

English cricketer

Personal information
- Full name: Ian Paul Butcher
- Born: 1 July 1962 (age 64); Farnborough, Kent, England
- Height: 6 ft 0 in (1.83 m)
- Batting: Right-handed
- Bowling: Right-arm medium
- Relatives: Alan Butcher (brother), Martin Butcher (brother), Mark Butcher (nephew), Gary Butcher (nephew)

Career statistics
Competition	First-class	List A
Matches	124	91
Runs scored	5,480	1,876
Batting average	29.62	24.05
100s/50s	11/24	2/8
Top score	139	103*
Balls bowled	84	9
Wickets	1	1
Bowling average	43.00	10.00
5 wickets in innings	0	0
10 wickets in match	0	0
Best bowling	1/2	1/6
Catches/stumpings	87/–	27/–
- Source: CricketArchive, 13 April 2022

Ian Paul Butcher (born 1 July 1962) is a former English first-class cricketer. He is the brother of former England Test player Alan Butcher and uncle of Mark Butcher.

Butcher was a regular opening batsman for Leicestershire during the 1980s, topping 1000 runs in a season twice. In 1988 he moved to Gloucestershire but was released after a couple of seasons.
