= Butcher of Bosnia =

"Butcher of Bosnia" is a sobriquet that may refer to:

- Ratko Mladić (1942–2026), Bosnian Serb former general and Chief of Staff of the Army of Republika Srpska
- Radovan Karadžić (born 1945), Bosnian Serb former politician and President of Republika Srpska

== See also ==
- Butcher of the Balkans
- Butcher of the Somme, a sobriquet given to Douglas Haig, 1st Earl Haig (1861–1928), the commander of the British Expeditionary Force in World War One
