= Boutilier =

Boutilier is a surname. Notable people with the surname include:

- Alicia Boutilier (born 1968), Canadian art curator
- Ava Boutilier (born 1999), Canadian ice hockey goaltender
- Goldie Boutilier (born 1985), Canadian singer and songwriter
- Guy Boutilier (1959–2024), Canadian politician
- Kate Boutilier (born 1966), American screenwriter
- Paul Boutilier (1963–2026), Canadian ice hockey defenceman
- Rob Boutilier (born 1971), Canadian animator, director, writer, and storyboard artist
- Robert Boutilier (1953–2003), Canadian biologist

== See also ==
- Boutiliers Point, Nova Scotia, rural community in Halifax
- Boutilier v. Immigration and Naturalization Service, lawsuit
- Boutillier, surname
- Le Boutillier, surname
