= The Butcher (2007 film) =

2007 film

- Directed by: Kim Jin-won
- Produced by: Choi Gong-jae
- Starring: You Dong-hun; Kim Sung-il
- Release date: 2007
- Running time: 75 minutes
- Country: South Korea
- Language: Korean

The Butcher is a 2007 South Korean horror film directed by Kim Jin-won and produced by Choi Gong-jae. The film starring Kim Sung-il, You Dong-hun in the lead roles.

== Cast ==
- You Dong-hun
- Kim Sung-il

== Reception ==
James Mudge called the film, "An incredibly visceral experience and the closest a viewer can get to actually feeling tortured - this can be taken as either as a warning or a recommendation."
