= David Butcher (cricketer) =

English cricketer (born 1969)

Personal information
- Full name: David Neil Butcher
- Born: 2 October 1969 (age 57); Colchester, Essex, England
- Batting: Right-handed
- Bowling: Slow left-arm orthodox

Domestic team information
- Years: Team
- 1992–1994: Devon

Career statistics
Competition	List A
Matches	1
Runs scored	1
Batting average	–
100s/50s	–/–
Top score	1*
Balls bowled	72
Wickets	2
Bowling average	24.00
5 wickets in innings	–
10 wickets in match	–
Best bowling	2/48
Catches/stumpings	1/–
- Source: Cricinfo, 6 February 2011

David Neil Butcher (born 2 October 1969) is a former English cricketer. Butcher was a right-handed batsman who bowled slow left-arm orthodox. He was born in Colchester, Essex.

Butcher made his debut for Devon in the Minor Counties Championship against Berkshire in 1992. From 1992 to 1994, he represented Devon in 14 Championship matches, the last of which came against Cornwall. In 1992, he played his only List A match for Devon, which came against Kent in the 1992 NatWest Trophy. In this match he scored an unbeaten single run and with the ball he took the wickets of Neil Taylor and Carl Hooper.
