= Butchers (film) =

- Directed by: Adrian Langley
- Written by: Adrien Langley; Daniel Weissenberger
- Produced by: Adrian Langley; Doug Phillips; Kevin Preece
- Starring: Simon Phillips; Michael Swatton; Julie Mainville; Anne-Carolyne Binette; Samantha De Benedet; James Gerald Hicks
- Cinematography: Adrian Langley
- Edited by: Adrian Langley
- Production companies: NW9 Productions; UNIT XIX
- Release dates: 15 October 2020 (Telluride Horror Show); 12 January 2021
- Running time: 92 minutes
- Country: Canada
- Language: English

Butchers is a 2020 Canadian slasher film directed by Adrian Langley, starring Simon Phillips, Michael Swatton, Julie Mainville, Anne-Carolyne Binette, Samantha De Benedet and James Gerald Hicks. "A Good Man Is Hard to Find" by Marion Harris is featured in the movie.

== Summary ==
Two sadistic brothers have dug into the back country and, from the deep freeze of winter to the dog days of summer, anyone who crosses their path is dead meat in North Dakota.

== Cast ==
- Simon Phillips as Owen Watson
- Michael Swatton as Oswald Watson
- Julie Mainville as Jenna Simpson
- Anne-Carolyne Binette as Taylor Smythe
- James Gerald Hicks as Mike Crenshaw
- Nick Allan as Willard
- Blake Canning as Steven Crane
- Samantha De Benedet as Celeste
- Jonathan Largy as Oxford
- Frederik Storm as Christopher Powell

== Release ==
The film was released on digital on 22 February 2021 and on DVD on 8 March.

== Reception ==
Martin Unsworth of Starburst rated the film 3 stars out of 5, writing that "While it won’t win any awards for originality, it’s a fun watch for those with a stomach and in the mood for another ‘hillbillies with a cannibal brother’ flick." Chris Cummings of Nerdly rated the film 2.5 stars out of 5, writing that "It’s nothing groundbreaking, but it’s enjoyable". Phuong Le of The Guardian rated the film 2 stars out of 5, writing that the film is "pretty much dead meat, an amalgam of worn-out tropes unsuccessfully zombified to life." Film critic Anton Bitel wrote that while the film "is neither original nor particularly demanding viewing", it "plays out its borrowed tropes with knowing, bloody efficiency". Film critic Kim Newman wrote that while the film "throws in a few bits of eccentricity (one butcher coaching another through a Hamlet soliloquy) and frames some nice widescreen landscapes", it "defaults to how mean-spirited-can-you-get turns of plot."

== Sequels ==
In 2024, Butchers Book Two: Raghorn and Butchers Book Three: Bonesaw, were released. Though directed by Adrian Langley, the three stories are unrelated to each other.
