= Yurino (Cherkutinskoye Rural Settlement), Sobinsky District, Vladimir Oblast =

Yurino Юрино
- Village
- Location within Vladimir Oblast Location within Russia
- Coordinates: 56°11′N 39°42′E
- Country: Russia
- Region: Vladimir Oblast
- District: Sobinsky District
- Time zone: UTC+3:00

Yurino (Russian: Юрино) is a rural locality (a village) in Cherkutinskoye Rural Settlement, Sobinsky District, Vladimir Oblast, Russia. The population was 34 as of 2010.

== Geography ==
The village is located 4 km west from Cherkutino, 38 km north-west from Sobinka.
