= Barbara Butcher =

American death examiner and author

Barbara Butcher is an American forensic scientist. She was a death investigator for the New York City Office of Chief Medical Examiner and is the author of a memoir, What The Dead Know: Learning About Life As A New York City Death Investigator. She was one of the people who was responsible for remains recovery and identification of people who died at the World Trade Center on 9/11.

== Early life and education ==
Butcher was born in Brooklyn, NY and grew up in Massapequa, NY. Her father worked for the NYPD as a Deputy Inspector and her uncle is also a Police Officer. She has a BS from Long Island University and a Masters in Public Health from Columbia University.

== Forensic career ==
Butcher had worked first as a physician's assistant and was promoted to hospital administrator, eventually losing her job to alcoholism. She became sober through a 12-step program and went to vocational rehab to find a new career. New York's Employment Program for Recovering Alcoholics suggested she work as a coroner. In 1992 she began a career as a medicolegal investigator with the Office of Chief Medical Examiner of the City of New York. She was the second woman they had hired and the first one who stayed on the job more than three months.

She worked there for 23 years, eventually becoming Chief of Staff and director of the Forensic Science Training Program, an academy she founded which provided national training on best practices in death investigation. She investigated more than 5,500 deaths, 680 of which were homicides.

== Consultant and author ==
When Bill de Blasio became mayor of New York and made his own appointments, Butcher lost her job. She experienced deep depression after becoming unemployed and was hospitalized. The experience led her to write her 2023 memoir What The Dead Know: Learning About Life As A New York City Death Investigator during the 2020 COVID lockdown. It was published by Simon & Schuster in 2023. Kirkus Reviews summarized it as "a sober, queer woman describes how becoming a New York City medicolegal examiner changed her life." The New York Times said it "feels lifted from a noir film."

She currently works as a consultant in forensic and medicolegal services and worked on Dick Wolf's Netflix show Homicide: New York in 2024. Wolf gave Butcher her own show, The Death Investigator With Barbara Butcher which is shown on the Oxygen True Crime network and Peacock.
