= Gary Butcher =

English cricketer

Personal information
- Full name: Gary Paul Butcher
- Born: 11 March 1975 (age 51); Clapham, London, England
- Batting: Right-handed
- Bowling: Right-arm medium
- Relatives: Alan Butcher (father), Mark Butcher (brother), Martin Butcher (uncle); Ian Butcher (uncle)

Domestic team information
- Years: Team
- 1994-1998: Glamorgan
- 1999-2002: Surrey
- 2003: Hertfordshire

Career statistics
Competition	First-class	List A
Matches	53	69
Runs scored	1,841	819
Batting average	27.89	19.04
100s/50s	1/12	1/0
Top score	101*	126
Balls bowled	3,661	1,278
Wickets	63	28
Bowling average	37.93	49.67
5 wickets in innings	2	0
10 wickets in match	0	0
Best bowling	7/77	4/32
Catches/stumpings	19/–	6/–
- Source: CricketArchive, 13 April 2022

Gary Paul Butcher (born 11 March 1975) is a former English first-class cricketer. The brother of England Test player Mark and son of Alan, he was an all-rounder who bowled right arm medium pace.

Butcher started his career with Glamorgan in 1994, taking a wicket with his very first delivery in the Sunday League. He made his only first-class hundred in 1997, against Oxford University from just 64 balls. His best bowling figures came against Gloucestershire at Bristol in 1996 when he took 7/77.

After not being able to command a regular position in the County Championship side he crossed over to Surrey in 1999. At Surrey he was part of a successful team, winning the Championship.

In 2000 during a Championship match against Derbyshire he took four wickets in four balls, the first Surrey bowler to achieve the feat since Pat Pocock in 1972.

Since retiring from playing, Butcher has worked as a sports coach at King's College School in Wimbledon, Reigate Priory CC and Wilson's School.
