= Alan Butcher =

English cricketer (born 1954)

Personal information
- Full name: Alan Raymond Butcher
- Born: 7 January 1954 (age 72); Croydon, Surrey, England
- Height: 5 ft 8 in (1.73 m)
- Batting: Left-handed
- Bowling: Left-arm medium Slow left-arm orthodox
- Relatives: Ian Butcher (brother); Martin Butcher (brother); Mark Butcher (son); Gary Butcher (son)

International information
- National side: England
- Only Test (cap 482): 30 August 1979 v India
- Only ODI (cap 57): 20 August 1980 v Australia

Domestic team information
- Years: Team
- 1972–1986, 1998: Surrey
- 1987–1992: Glamorgan

Career statistics
Competition	Test	ODI	FC	LA
Matches	1	1	402	359
Runs scored	34	14	22,667	9,619
Batting average	17.00	14.00	36.32	31.43
100s/50s	0/0	0/0	46/123	7/56
Top score	20	14	216*	140
Balls bowled	12	–	10,008	3,788
Wickets	0	–	141	75
Bowling average	–	–	38.53	33.72
5 wickets in innings	–	–	1	1
10 wickets in match	–	–	0	0
Best bowling	–	–	6/48	5/19
Catches/stumpings	0/–	0/–	185/–	85/–
- Source: ESPNcricinfo, 8 August 2015

Alan Raymond Butcher (born 7 January 1954) is a former English cricketer who is part of a family known for its strong cricketing connections. Although only selected to play for England on one occasion, he was lauded for his skills in first-class cricket and was named a Wisden Cricketer of the Year in 1991. He became Essex coach in 1993, and coached Surrey between 2005 and 2008. Cricket writer, Colin Bateman noted Butcher was, "a popular and accomplished left-handed opener, unlucky to be consigned to membership of the 'One Cap Club'... despite consistent county performances and an ability to tackle quick bowlers, Butcher was passed over".

== Personal life ==
=== Early years ===
Born in Croydon, Surrey, Butcher played his earliest organised cricket with Beckenham under-11's. His parents moved to Australia where he spent five and a half of his formative years during which time he played for Glenelg youth team. His performances there won him their Junior Cricketer award for outstanding play and a selection to the South Australia under-15 team. Had his parents stayed in Australia, he would likely have joined the senior side and later been eligible to play for Australia as his adopted country. However, his parents chose to move back to England.

=== Cricket in the family ===
Cricket is a strong tradition in Alan Butcher's family. His two brothers, Martin and Ian, both played first-class cricket and both of his sons have also gone on to do so. His elder son, Mark found fame playing for, and also captaining, Surrey and was for some time a mainstay batsman for England, not suffering the one-Test fate of his father. The younger, Gary, has also played for Surrey and Glamorgan. In 1991, Mark and Alan Butcher played against each other in a Sunday League match at The Oval, on the occasion of Mark's Surrey debut. Mark Butcher announced his retirement from cricket in 2009.

== Cricketing career ==
=== Early years ===
Butcher was a left-handed opening batsman with an aggressive playing style and a fondness for hitting shots off the back foot, although he started his career as a left-arm fast-medium bowler. He began playing for Surrey in 1972 as a bowler, but started opening the batting in 1975. He stayed with Surrey for 15 years. When Grahame Clinton joined Surrey in 1979, the two formed a successful and longstanding opening partnership. They shared in nineteen century opening stands for Surrey, including one of 277 against Yorkshire in 1984.

=== International selection and sole Test cap ===
In 1979, he was picked to play for England against India in a Test match at The Oval, but he did not settle, and only managed scores of 14 and 20. He was not selected for England in Test matches again (although he did play one one-day international against Australia in 1980), in spite of the opinion of the then England captain Mike Brearley, who rated him one of the top players of fast bowling in the county game. During his time with Surrey, he averaged between 1,300 and 1,700 runs each season.

=== Later years and retirement from playing ===
In 1982, Butcher made 86 not out in the final as Surrey won the NatWest Trophy. In 1986, Surrey declined to renew his contract and he seriously considered retiring as a cricketer. However, Glamorgan approached him with an offer of a team place which he accepted. He eventually rose to captain Glamorgan in 1989, before retiring in 1992. He made 22,667 runs in first-class matches in 684 innings, with 46 hundreds and a high score of 216 not out. His most productive season was 1990, when he scored 2,116 runs at 58.77, which contributed to his being selected as one of the five Wisden Cricketers of the Year in the 1991 edition. He also took 141 wickets in his career at 38.53, with a best innings analysis of 6 for 48.

== Coaching career ==
=== English counties ===
Butcher followed his playing career with coaching roles at Essex and Surrey. However, he made a surprise comeback as a player for Surrey in 1998, at the age of 44, when injury left them short of players. His recall coincided with the day his son Mark Butcher made his maiden Test century for England against South Africa. In his first County Championship match since 1992, Butcher senior scored 22 and 12.

Having been Surrey's Assistant Coach, he was appointed the Chief Coach for the 2006 season. He left his post following Surrey's relegation from the 1st Division of the County Championship in 2008.

=== International ===
From 4 March 2010 until early 2013 Butcher was the head coach of the Zimbabwe national cricket team. Butcher was highly credited for reviving Zimbabwean cricket as the national and domestic game greatly improved. When Butcher took over, the team's confidence was at an all-time low. Butcher gave that side more confidence and responsibility. In return, the Zimbabwean team defeated Australia and Pakistan in the warm-ups of the 2010 ICC World Twenty20, but struggled in the main event. They also defeated Sri Lanka and India (twice) in the Tri-Series tournament.

Following this, expectations were high that Zimbabwe would spring an upset or two at the 2011 Cricket World Cup, but the team could not match those expectations.

This was followed by victory in Zimbabwe's first Test match in six years, against Bangladesh, which was a historic achievement, further backed up by another ODI Series win. The team then had a nine-match losing streak before they broke it with a record win against top opponent New Zealand, chasing 328 to win. They then nearly defeated the same opponents in the one-off Test, chasing 366 at Bulawayo, but a spectacular collapse, in which they lost six wickets for 44 runs made them end up with a 34-run loss.

With their recent improved performances Butcher, who had a major role to play, said that his team could beat New Zealand on the Test match in the return leg in January 2012.

He wrote a book about his time with Zimbabwe entitled The Good Murungu? A Cricket Tale of the Unexpected, which was published in 2016.

== Bibliography ==
- Alan Butcher, The Good Murungu?: A Cricket Tale of the Unexpected, Pitch Publishing Ltd, 2016, ISBN 9781785311314.

== See also ==
- One Test Wonder
