= Butcher of the Balkans =

Butcher of the Balkans is a sobriquet that has been used for the following individuals who committed or were otherwise responsible for war crimes and other atrocities in the Balkans.

- Andrija Artuković (1899–1988), Croatian fascist politician, Porajmos perpetrator, perpetrator of the genocide of the Serbs, and a minister of the Independent State of Croatia
- Ante Pavelić (1889–1959), Croatian fascist politician, Porajmos perpetrator, perpetrator of the genocide of the Serbs, and leader of the Independent State of Croatia
- Slobodan Milošević (1941–2006), president of Serbia and the Federal Republic of Yugoslavia
- Ratko Mladić (1942–2026), Bosnian Serb general during the Bosnian War, convicted perpetrator of the genocide of the Bosniaks
- Radovan Karadžić (born 1945), Bosnian Serb president, convicted perpetrator of the genocide of the Bosniaks

In fiction

- Henrik Willemse, a villain in the last Little Orphan Annie (2010) arc, continued in Dick Tracy (2014)

== See also ==
- Butcher of Bosnia
- Butcher of the Somme, a sobriquet given to Douglas Haig, 1st Earl Haig (1861–1928), the commander of the British Expeditionary Force in World War One
