= Yurino, Kovrovsky District, Vladimir Oblast =

Yurino Юрино
- Village
- Location within Vladimir Oblast Location within Russia
- Coordinates: 56°29′N 41°47′E
- Country: Russia
- Region: Vladimir Oblast
- District: Kovrovsky District
- Time zone: UTC+3:00

Yurino (Russian: Юрино) is a rural locality (a village) in Klyazminskoye Rural Settlement, Kovrovsky District, Vladimir Oblast, Russia. The population was 82 as of 2010.

== Geography ==
Yurino is located on the Klyazma River, 36 km northeast of Kovrov (the district's administrative centre) by road. Doronikha is the nearest rural locality.
