= Victor Boutilly =

French forestry inspector (1864–1934)

- Born: 25 November 1864; Perthes, Haute-Marne
- Died: 22 March 1934 (aged 69); Algiers
- Occupation: Forestry inspector
- Awards: Croix de Guerre
- Honours: Officer d'Académie (1901) Mérite Agricole (1902) Officer de l'Instruction Publique (1910) (Note: Equivalent to the modern Palms d'Académie, officer.) Légion d'Honneur (1911)

Victor Joseph Adrien Boutilly (25 November 1864 – 22 March 1934) was a French forestry inspector and author of books and articles related to forestry and forest regulation. He acted as a senior official within the Algerian Forestry Service and later the Forestry Department of Algeria. In 1911, he received the Légion d'Honneur for his work with the Forestry Service.

== Early life ==
Boutilly was born in Perthes, Haute-Marne on 25 November 1864. He attended the French National School of Forestry in Nice from 1884 to 1886, then served as a forest ranger in Levier and Langeac between 1887 and 1891. Between 1891 and 1894, he served as a forest ranger in various French colonies, including Aïn Beïda in Algeria, Kef in Tunisia, and Réunion.

== Career ==
=== Work in forestry management ===
After returning to France from Réunion, Boutilly served as an Inspecteur adjoint at-large from 1894 to 1897. After, he worked in Vivario, Corsica until 1899. During this time, Boutilly completed two reports for the Crédit Foncier Colonial, a development bank in Réunion for which he worked as the head of the Forestry and Secondary Crops Department. The first, a study on the tea industry in Ceylon, was well received and published as two articles in the Revue des Cultures Coloniales in 1897. In 1898, the study was awarded a silver medal at the annual meeting of the Société d'Agriculture de France, and was published as a book with additional illustrations and a section evaluating the possibility of tea production on Réunion.

Boutilly's report on tea was followed by Le caféier de Libéria: sa culture et sa manipulation, which was published in 1900. His efforts received national recognition when he was named an Officer d'Académie in 1901 and a chevalier of the Mérite Agricole in 1902.

In 1900, Boutilly was appointed to work with the Head of the Technical Department to study the significant problems posed by the recently granted administrative and financial autonomy of Algeria. Their work together resulted in the Algerian Forestry Code. In 1903, Boutilly took the role of chief forest inspector for all of Algeria. As chief forest inspector, he drew up the implementation decrees for the Forestry Law, as well as creating a collection of rules, regulation, and decrees for the Algerian forestry industry in 1904. In 1906, Boutilly authored a summary report on the Algerian Forestry Service that was published in the Revue des Eaux et Forêts. His work with the Forestry Service was recognized by advancing his Mérite Agricole to the rank of officer in 1907, naming him an Officer de l'Instruction Publique in 1910, and awarding the Légion d'Honneur, chevalier in 1911.

When the Forestry Department of Algeria was created in 1910, he left his post in central administration to lead the newly created Reforestation Service, continuing in his rank as Inspectuer in the Forestry Service.

=== Activity during World War I ===
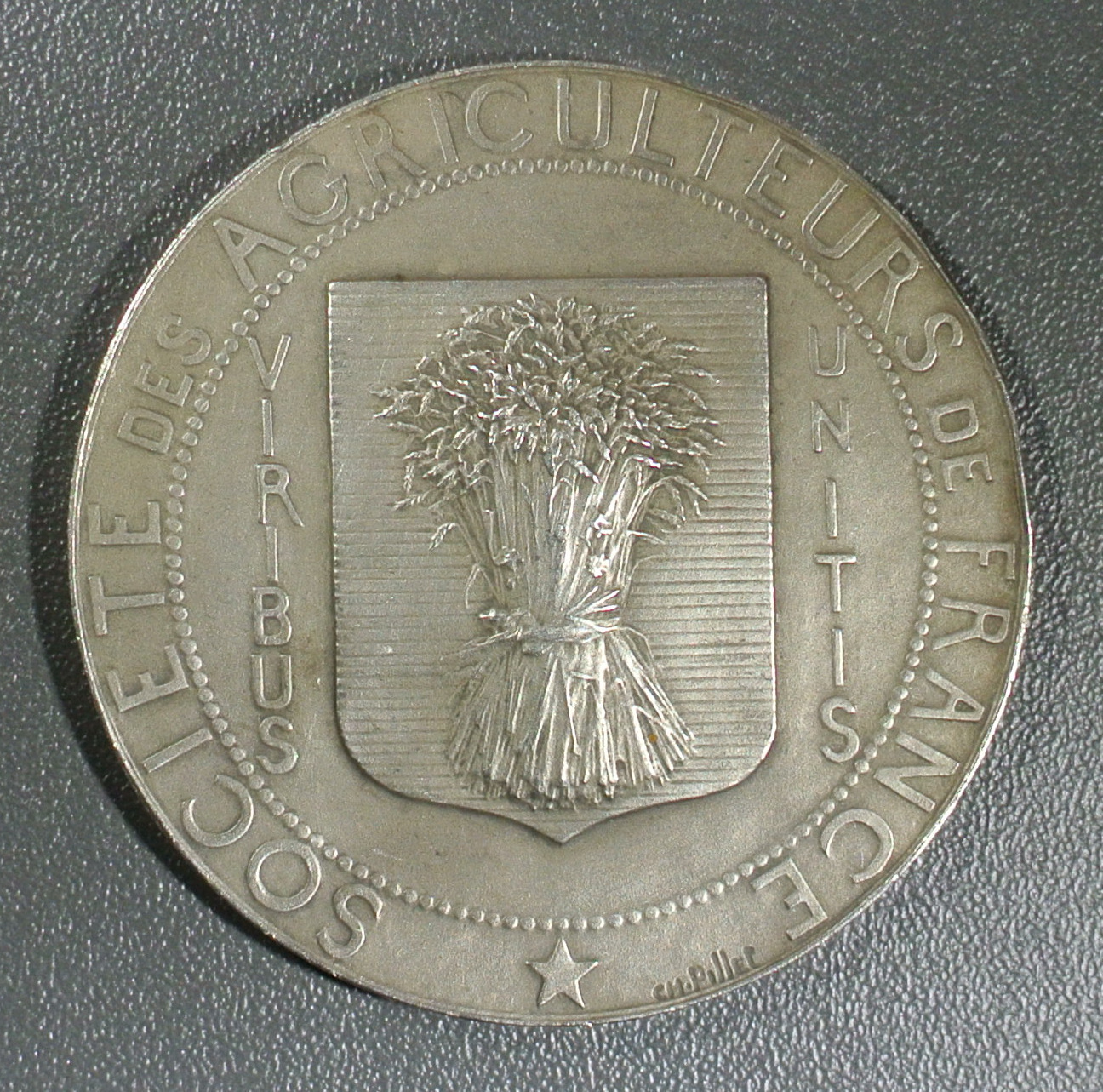
Silver medal from the Société d'Agriculture de France

During World War I, Boutilly maintained a reserve commission with the French Army. During this time, he received the Croix de Guerre with two citations. During the years France was at war, Boutilly reviewed the sections on Algerian and Tunisian forestry for Theodore Salisbury Woolsey Jr.'s book French Forest and Forestry: Tunisia, Algeria, Corsica, which contains an English translation of the Algerian forestry code Boutilly helped develop.

=== Continuing forestry work in Algiers ===
In 1919, Boutilly was promoted to the rank of Conservateur and assumed the roles of Conservator of Water and Forests and Director of the Forestry Department of Algeria. He was next promoted to the senior rank of Inspecteur Général in 1925, keeping his role as Director. In April 1931, he was appointed Director First Class of the General Government of Algeria. His service to forestry was recognized by his promotion to an Officer of the Légion d'Honneur in 1925 and Commander of the Mérite Agricole in 1927.

== Later life ==
Boutilly retired from the Forestry Department of Algeria in 1933. Until his death, he was active as Vice President of the Algiers Tourism Syndicate and the Secretary of the Geographic Society of Algiers and North Africa. He was also a member of the Ligue of Reboisement and a proponent of local beekeepers, taking a personal interest in the installation of bee hives in tourism areas within the national forests of Algeria.

Boutilly died following a long illness on March 22, 1934. He is buried in the Algiers European Cemetery on Boulevard Bru.
