= Marie-Claude Bomsel =

French veterinarian

Marie-Claude Dominique Bomsel
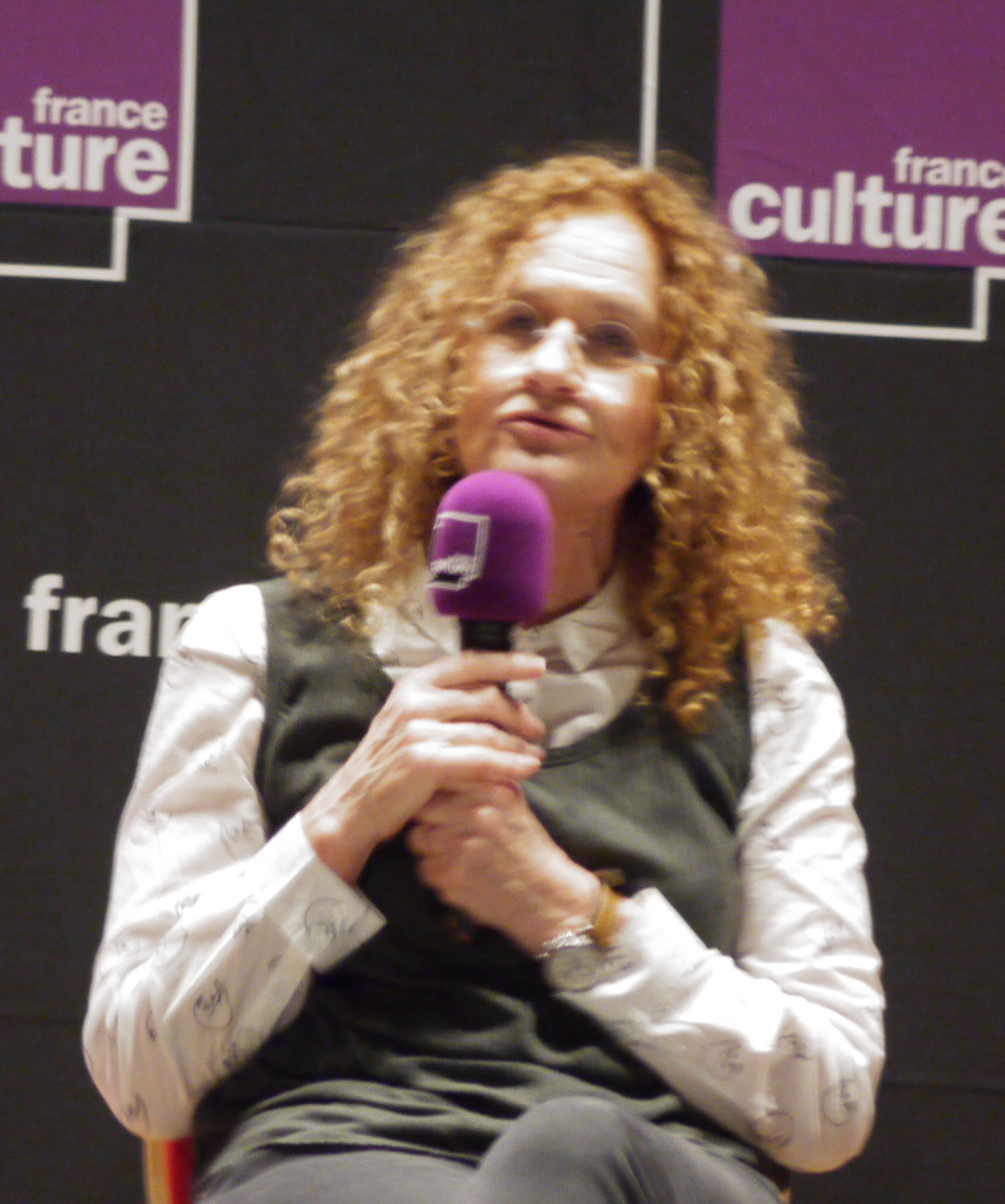
- Born: 1946 (age 79–80); Versailles, Yvelines, France

Marie-Claude Dominique Bomsel (born 1946) is a French veterinary doctor and professor at the National Museum of Natural History. Outside of her work as a researcher and teacher, she is a wildlife commentator in the programme C'est au programme on France 2. She regularly appears in programmes where various journalists ask her questions about subjects on which she is considered to be an expert. Marie-Claude Dominique Bomsel is the president of the Jane Goodall Institute, France.

== Biography ==
Born into a bourgeois environment of the city of Versailles, Marie-Claude Bomsel has been passionate about animals since childhood. In 1969, she began studying to be a veterinarian at the École nationale vétérinaire d'Alfort. After graduating, she worked for a few months in rural areas of France, before flying to the Central African Republic with her husband. When the government of Bokassa decided to deport resident aliens, she returned to France, where she obtained an internship at the zoological park in Vincennes. She then worked at the Jardin des Plantes in Paris, where she ran the Ménagerie, from 1981 to 1989 and from 2001 to 2004. Since then, she works as a professor at the Natural History Museum at the heart of the Department of Botanical and Zoological Gardens.

Marie-Claude Bomsel, a professor at the National Museum of Natural History, wrote 79 articles on Mammals for the supplement to the Encyclopædia Universalis published in 1999.

== Awards ==
- Knight of the Legion of Honour

== Publications ==
- Bomsel, Marie-Claude (1986). Pas si bêtes [Not so stupid]. Jean-Claude Lattès. ISBN 978-2709605496.
- Bomsel, Marie-Claude (1998). Le dépit du gorille amoureux et autres effets de la passion dans le règne animal [The spite of the amorous gorilla and other effects of passion in the animal kingdom]. JC Lattès. ISBN 2-7096-1892-3.
- Bomsel, Marie-Claude (2000). Questions d'amours [Questions of loves]. Paris: Garde-temps. ISBN 2-913545-04-1.
- Bomsel, Marie-Claude (2003). La vie rêvée des bêtes : elles ne sont pas ce que nous croyons ! [The dream life of beasts: they are not what we believe!]. Paris: M. Lafon. ISBN 2-84098-991-3.
- Bomsel, Marie-Claude Bomsel; Collard, Lorraine (2006). Leur sixième sens : les animaux sont-ils plus "sensés" que nous? [Their sixth sense: the animals who have more "sense" than us?]. Neuilly-sur-Seine: Michel Lafon. ISBN 2-7499-0404-8.
- Bomsel, Marie-Claude (2007). Féli vétérinaire [Cat vet]. Paris: Plon jeunesse. ISBN 978-2259207270.
- Bomsel, Marie-Claude (2015). Le tour du monde des animaux [Around the world of animals]. éditions Rue des Enfants. ISBN 978-2-3518-1246-4.
