= Butchers Lake =

Lake in Victoria, Australia

- Location in Victoria
- Location: Western District Lakes, Victoria
- Coordinates: 38°10′58″S 143°37′18″E
- Lake type: Saline
- Basin countries: Australia

Butchers Lake is a small salt lake of the Corangamite catchment, located north of Lake Beeac and south of Lake Cundare, in the south-western lakes district of Victoria, Australia.
