= Yurino, Vichugsky District, Ivanovo Oblast =

Yurino Юрино
- Village
- Location within Ivanovo Oblast Location within Russia
- Coordinates: 57°12′N 42°01′E
- Country: Russia
- Region: Ivanovo Oblast
- District: Vichugsky District
- Time zone: UTC+3:00

Yurino (Russian: Юрино) is a rural locality (a village) in Vichugsky District, Ivanovo Oblast, Russia. Population: 40 (2010 census);

== Geography ==
This rural locality is located 7 km from Vichuga (the district's administrative centre), 68 km from Ivanovo (capital of Ivanovo Oblast) and 311 km from Moscow. Zherebtsovo is the nearest rural locality.
