= Yurino (Vorshinskoye Rural Settlement), Sobinsky District, Vladimir Oblast =

Yurino Юрино
- Village
- Location within Vladimir Oblast Location within Russia
- Coordinates: 56°05′N 40°07′E
- Country: Russia
- Region: Vladimir Oblast
- District: Sobinsky District
- Time zone: UTC+3:00

Yurino (Russian: Юрино) is a rural locality (a village) in Vorshinskoye Rural Settlement, Sobinsky District, Vladimir Oblast, Russia. The population was 32 as of 2010.

== Geography ==
The village is located on the Koloksha River, 10 km north-east from Vorsha, 19 km north-east from Sobinka.
