= Mike Butcher (journalist) =

British journalist

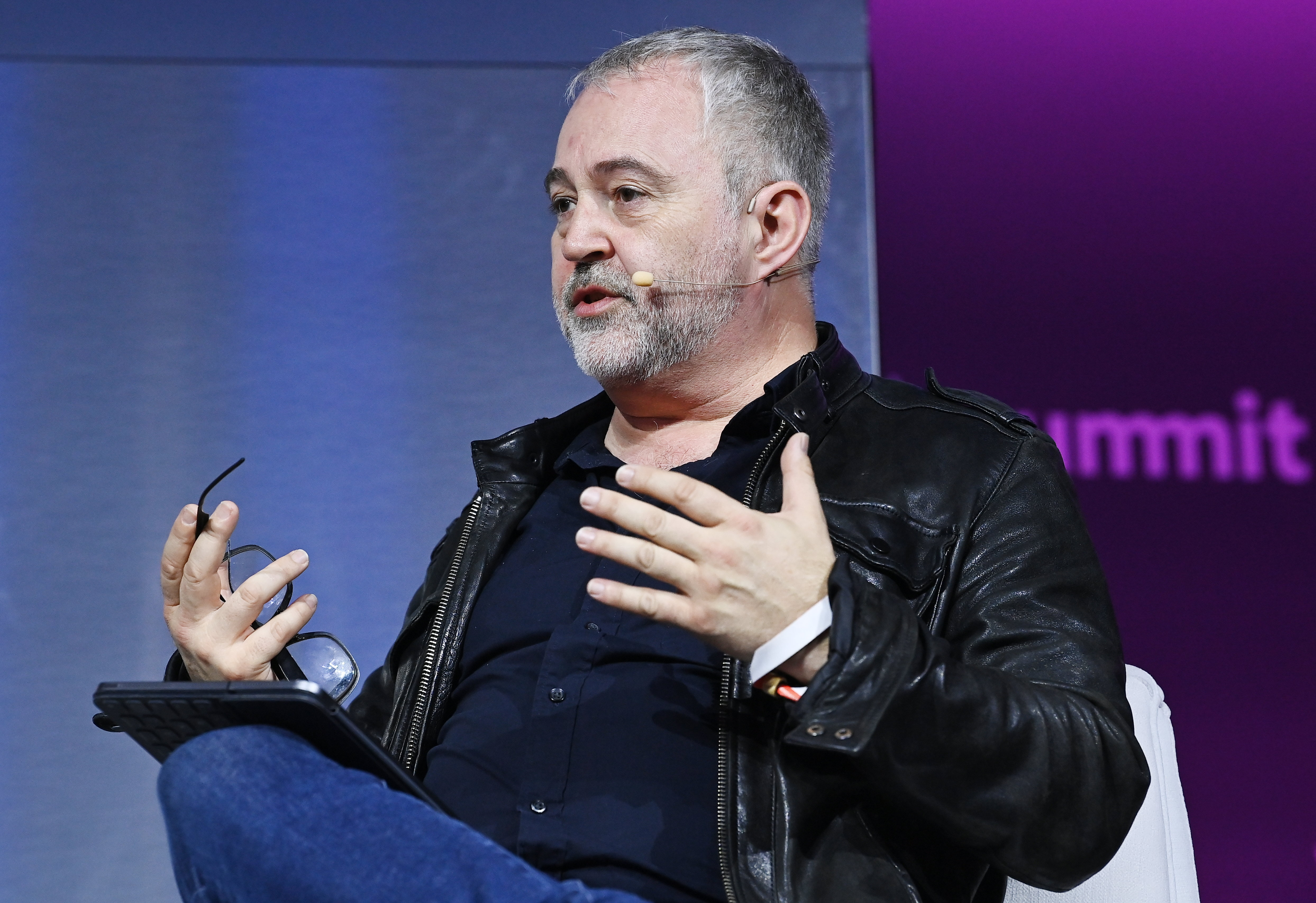
Mike Butcher, 2022

Mike Butcher MBE is a UK-based journalist and editor-at-large for TechCrunch. He was appointed Member of the Order of the British Empire (MBE) in the 2016 Birthday Honours for services to technology and journalism.

== Career ==
Early in his career, Butcher wrote for Newspaper Focus magazine, covering "the business of web sites". He joined New Media Age in 1996, when it was still a newsletter. By 1998, he was editor of New Media Age, and relaunched it as a magazine. In 2000, he became news editor for Industry Standard Europe. According to The Guardian, Industry Standard Europe was "the best source of new media news in the UK", but was shut down by IDG in 2001.

In October 2006, Butcher joined TechCrunch UK & Ireland as editor, but by mid-December, he quit after TechCrunch founder and publisher Michael Arrington sacked his co-editor Sam Sethi. In September 2007, The Guardian reported that Butcher was restarting TechCrunch UK. In 2009, the same newspaper reported that Butcher was "the sole full-time editorial employee, with no subeditors" at TechCrunch, and that he was writing for the blog "from all over Europe".

Starting in 2008, Butcher started to write about his vision for a "Digital Hub for the UK", after visiting The Digital Hub in Dublin. According to an article in European Planning Studies, Butcher was instrumental in publicising Silicon Roundabout in Shoreditch as an emerging cluster for the tech industry, along with Tim Bradshaw, technology journalist for the Financial Times.

== Impact efforts ==
In 2010, Butcher founded TechHub with entrepreneur Elizabeth Varley. According to the Financial Times, for ten years, the TechHub office space in Silicon Roundabout was "a focal point for the tech community" in London, and "home to hundreds of startups", but filed for administration in 2020 due to the COVID-19 pandemic.

Butcher founded Techfugees in 2015, as an organization for "tech solutions supporting the inclusion of displaced people." The organisation assists with identity verification for NGO workers, arranging remote work for refugees, and humanitarian aid.

== See also ==
- Mike Arrington
