= Stephen Butcher (Royal Marine) =

Royal Marine

Stephen Graham Butcher (2 January 1904 – December 2005) was, at age 101, one of only a few surviving veterans of the First World War in the UK. He joined the Royal Marines Band in 1917, at the age of 13, with the drum master turning "a blind eye to his height and age" (navynews 2004).

On his 100th birthday in January 2004, a party was given for Butcher at the RM Museum in Eastney, Portsmouth. He died at the end of the following year, aged 101.
