= Georges Mounin =

Georges Mounin, born Louis Leboucher, who also wrote under the pseudonym Jean Boucher (June 20, 1910 – January 10, 1993) was a French linguist, translator and semiotician. He was active in the French Resistance and the French Communist Party.

== Life and career ==
Louis Julien Leboucher was the son of a glass-maker. He started using the pseudonym 'Georges Mounin' in 1943, to escape censorship by the Vichy government. A member of the French Communist Party, he was also active in the French Resistance.

As a linguist, Mounin was a disciple of André Martinet. He was an Italianist who wrote on the theory of translation, the history of linguistics, stylistics and semiology.

Conrad Bureau, a former student of Mounin's, compiled an exhaustive 950-item bibliography of his writings.

== Works ==
- Problèmes théoriques de la traduction (Theoretical problems of translation), 1963.
- Histoire de la linguistique des origines au XXe siecle (History of linguistics from its origins to the 20th century), 1967
- Dictionnaire de la linguistique (Dictionary of linguistics), 1974
- Semiotic praxis: Studies in pertinence and in the means of expression and communication. Translated by Catherine Tihanyi with Maia and Bruce Wise, and with the collaboration of Vladimir Milicic and Josef Nix. London: Plenum, 1985.
- Teoria e storia della traduzione. Milano: Einaudi, 1990.
