= Mike Butcher (footballer) =

Australian rules footballer

Personal information
- Full name: Mike Butcher
- Born: 9 November 1942 (age 83)
- Original team: University Blues
- Height: 193 cm (6 ft 4 in)
- Weight: 89 kg (196 lb)

Playing career^{1}
Years	Club	Games (Goals)
1964–65	Hawthorn	21 (5)
- ^{1} Playing statistics correct to the end of 1965.

Mike Butcher (born 9 November 1942) is a former Australian rules footballer who played with Hawthorn in the Victorian Football League (VFL).
