= Mark Butcher =

English cricketer (born 1972)

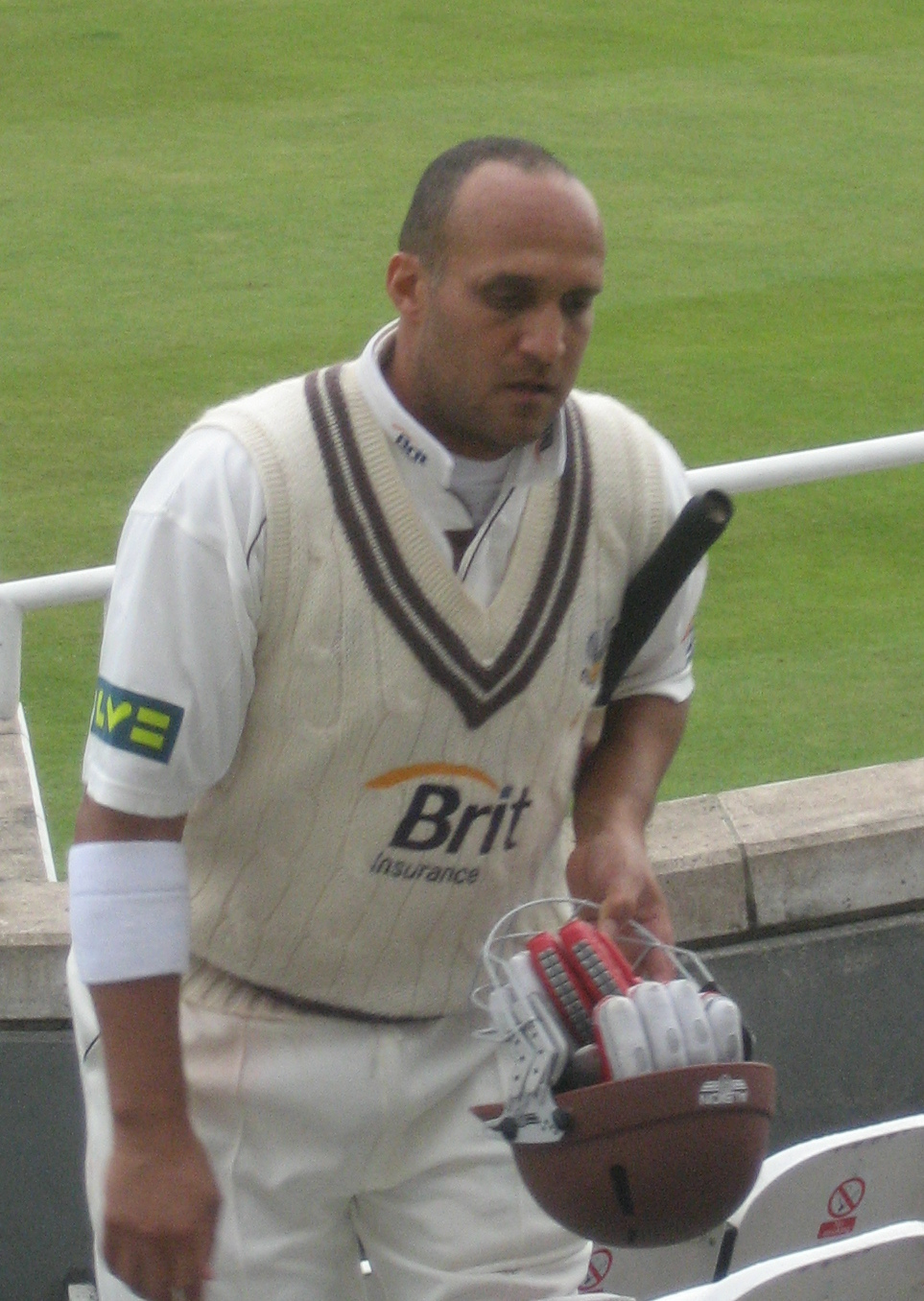
- Butcher at the Oval in 2007

Personal information
- Full name: Mark Alan Butcher
- Born: 23 August 1972 (age 54); Croydon, London, England
- Nickname: Butch, Baz
- Height: 5 ft 11 in (1.80 m)
- Batting: Left-handed
- Bowling: Right-arm medium
- Role: Opening batsman
- Relatives: Alan Butcher (father), Gary Butcher (brother)

International information
- National side: England
- Test debut (cap 584): 5 June 1997 v Australia
- Last Test: 30 December 2004 v South Africa

Domestic team information
- Years: Team
- 1992–2009: Surrey

Career statistics
Competition	Test	FC	LA	T20
Matches	71	280	191	13
Runs scored	4,288	17,870	4,460	210
Batting average	34.58	40.70	31.85	17.50
100s/50s	8/23	38/95	2/28	–/2
Top score	173*	259	139	60
Balls bowled	901	7,703	2,527	–
Wickets	15	125	49	–
Bowling average	36.06	33.89	45.10	–
5 wickets in innings	0	1	0	–
10 wickets in match	0	0	0	–
Best bowling	4/42	5/86	3/23	–
Catches/stumpings	61/–	263/–	63/–	4/–
- Source: Cricinfo, 6 August 2009

Mark Alan Butcher (born 23 August 1972) is an English cricket commentator and former English Test cricketer, who played county cricket for Surrey from 1992 until his retirement in 2009. He was a left-handed batsman, and occasional right-arm medium-pace bowler who was also capable of bowling off spin.

== Biography ==
He went to Cumnor House School in Purley from the age of five to thirteen before moving to Trinity School in Croydon. He first played for his school's U-11 side at the age of seven. He was also picked up by the Surrey U-11 side and also was selected in Surrey's U-19 team.

He married Alec Stewart's sister Judy but the marriage did not last. He dealt with various personal issues especially in 2000 following the break up of his marriage and his axing from the England side at the end of 2000. He also had issues with alcohol and depression.

== Cricket career ==
Butcher played all his county cricket for Surrey, for whom he made his first-class debut in 1992. He made his Test match debut in the first Test of the 1997 Ashes series at Edgbaston. He opened the batting on his debut test but did not produce the kind of scores that he would have liked but England managed to win that match by nine wickets albeit off a double century from Nasser Hussain. His last Test match was in December 2004, when he had played 71 Tests, making eight centuries and averaging over 34.

Butcher captained England once, in a draw with New Zealand in 1999 when Nasser Hussain was injured. He never appeared in a One Day International (ODI). Of players who have started in international cricket since the first ODI in 1970–71, Butcher is the "runaway leader" in terms of playing the most Test matches without appearing in an ODI. Butcher played in 71 Tests, but as of April 2004 no other player in the ODI era had played in more than 30 Tests without playing in an ODI.

Butcher enjoyed a reasonably good start to his Test career, hitting two half-centuries in five matches against a powerful Australian side. He then struggled (along with the rest of the England side) against the West Indies that winter, averaging just 15. However, in the next series he did very well, scoring two fifties and a century against South Africa. Though he followed that with another impressive hundred against Australia in the first Ashes Test that winter, he then failed for the rest of that series. A poor run of form followed, as he failed to score a half-century in twelve consecutive matches. Despite being appointed stand-in captain for one Test against New Zealand, he was dropped from the side in the winter of 2000. He subsequently lost his place in the Test side to Marcus Trescothick.

Butcher's domestic form then suffered a dramatic decline, and he found himself languishing in the Surrey second eleven at the start of the 2001 English domestic season. However, hard work and coaching from his father, Alan, himself a former Surrey and England player, sorted out his form. He was drafted into the Test side to play the Australians and strong showings throughout that series culminated in a superb innings of 173 not out at Headingley, as England successfully chased 315 to win (although the series was by then lost).

After that series, Butcher continued to prosper until a run of injuries saw him lose his place. Consistent performances had made him an essential component of the England batting line-up, to be relied upon in a crisis. Nowhere was this more apparent than in the series in the West Indies in 2003–04, when he always batted well irrespective of the sometimes poor showing by various partners at the other end, and he passed fifty in four out of seven innings. He was the top runscorer for England in England's emphatic series win in Caribbean by smacking 296 runs in four matches. A series of serious injuries kept Butcher out of the game for most of 2005, and his last Test was the first Test in South Africa in December 2004. The series of injury setbacks also subsequently put a dramatic end to his run of 42 successive test match appearances for England. During his illustrious yet volatile test career, he was regarded as one of the worst overnight resumers in test cricket as he often gets out quickly without adding much runs to his overnight score as he averages just 26.93 in 31 innings when it comes to starting the proceedings from overnight scores.

Thereafter, he struggled to recover properly from numerous injury set-backs, and although he retained the official captaincy of Surrey his appearances for the team became sporadic. In August 2009, Butcher announced his retirement from all first-class cricket after a troubling knee injury.

Since his retirement as a player, he has commentated on cricket for Sky Sports and has appeared as an expert summariser on Test Match Special, for Star Sports and ESPN Cricinfo. He appeared in Sky Sports documentary titled You Guys Are History where he explores and examines why there is a massive decline in black cricketers in England since the turn of the century.

He was awarded Honorary Life Membership of Marylebone Cricket Club (MCC) in January 2010.

=== Test centuries ===
Mark Butcher's Test centuries
No	Runs	Against	City/Country	Venue	Year
1	116	South Africa	Leeds, England	Headingley	1998
2	116	Australia	Brisbane, Australia	Brisbane Cricket Ground	1998
3	173*	Australia	Leeds, England	Headingley	2001
4	105	Sri Lanka	London, England	Lord's	2002
5	123	Sri Lanka	Manchester, England	Old Trafford	2002
6	124	Australia	Sydney, Australia	Sydney Cricket Ground	2003
7	137	Zimbabwe	London, England	Lord's	2003
8	106	South Africa	Nottingham, England	Trent Bridge	2003

== Music career ==
Butcher is also a guitar player and singer – he sang a ballad at Surrey and England teammate Ben Hollioake's funeral. Previously, in 2001, he appeared on the 'Jamie Theakston Cricket Show' on BBC Radio 5 Live, where he played a live acoustic version of "(Get A) Grip (On Yourself)" by The Stranglers with the former Stranglers' frontman Hugh Cornwell. In early 2008, Butcher started recording his debut album, Songs from the Sun House. Released in 2010, it includes "You're Never Gone", the song he wrote in tribute to Hollioake.

Mark Butcher partnered Sarah Brightman on the second series of Just the Two of Us aired on BBC One in January 2007; they came third overall.

== Personal life ==
He was born to a Jamaican mother and an English father.

Butcher attended Cumnor House Prep School, Trinity School and Archbishop Tenison's School in Croydon, and supports the local football team, Crystal Palace.

At one time during his playing career, Butcher was married to former England and Surrey teammate Alec Stewart's sister Judy. Surrey's former coach and player, Alan Butcher, is his father, and his brother, Gary, played for Glamorgan and Surrey.
