= Anne-Marie Imbrecq =

Nurse and French WW2 pilot

Anne-Marie Jeanne Imbrecq
- Born: 18 June 1911; Paris, France
- Died: 28 November 2005 (aged 94); Bagneux, France
- Occupations: Civil and military aviator, parachuter, nurse
- Father: Joseph Imbrecq

Anne-Marie Jeanne Imbrecq (18 June 1911 – 28 November 2005) was a nurse, parachutist, and French civil and military aircraft pilot active in Europe and Africa during World War II.

== Biography ==
Anne-Marie was the daughter of Paris lawyer Joseph Imbrecq who specialized in transport law. She graduated as a nurse and joined the Red Cross in 1932. In that same year she earned her pilot's license for tourism (Patent no 14166,10 May 1932), and later became a parachutist and was awarded her pilot license for public transport in 1937.

In 1932, Imbrecq was called to court in Paris for an investigation into the death of parachutist Marcel Gayet who died after a failed parachute jump from the Eiffel Tower (a practice that had been completely prohibited since 1912). In spite of the ban on launches, Imbrecq herself had successfully jumped after him. The trial finished without any consequences for the young woman.

Imbrecq was among the first volunteers who enlisted for service in World War II in 1939. She first went to work with the health services of the French Air Force. In February 1940, she flew to Finland on a Red Cross mission there, and she returned to Paris on 7 April 1940. She appointed second-lieutenant in 1940 and sent off to then-French-colony Algeria and the French Air Force in North Africa (APN), where she contributed to the air transport service. When Tunisia was occupied, she joined the African Free Corps as a nurse and paramedic. She also participated in the Corsican Campaign as a rescuer. She was director of the first French female glider flight course.

When World War II ended, Imbreq, who had earned the rank of lieutenant in 1943, was hailed as "a heroine of the Resistance" for her work in North Africa.

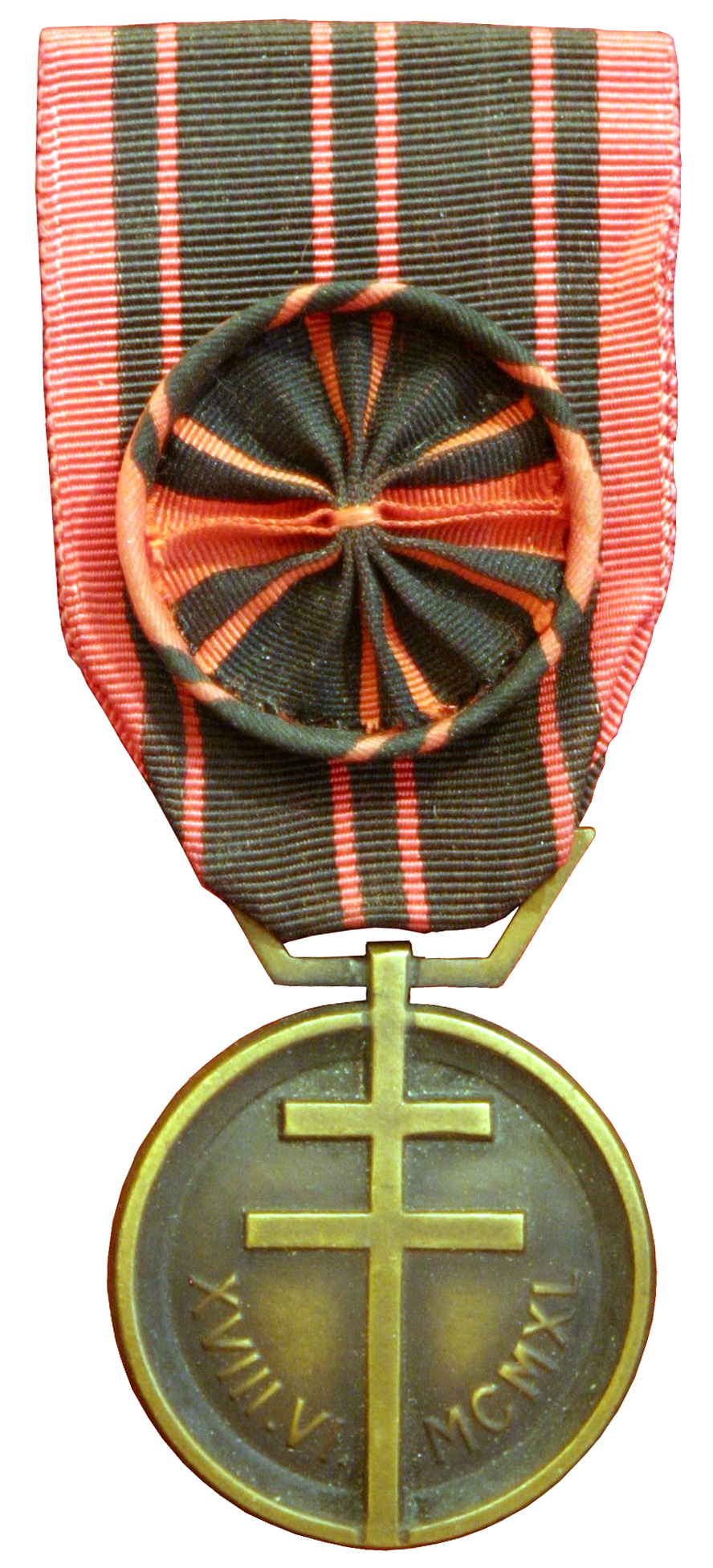
Resistance Medal established by a decree of General Charles de Gaulle "to recognize the remarkable acts of faith and of courage that, in France, in the empire and abroad, have contributed to the resistance of the French people against the enemy and against its accomplices since 18 June 1940."

== Post-war training ==
After the French Liberation in 1944, Imbreq was still in North Africa when she learned that President Charles De Gaulle's new Air Minister Charles Tillon, was forming a team of female military pilots, learning about it "by hearsay that there was an internship. I then returned directly and asked to be part of it .” For the Premier corps de pilotes militaires féminins, Tillon enlisted women who had earned their civilian pilot's licenses before the start of the war. Training was at Martinerie camp, near Châteauroux and Tours in central France. A strong bond formed among the pilots, including Maryse Bastié, Maryse Hilsz, Suzanne Melk, Élisabeth Boselli, Andrée Dupeyron, Élisabeth Lion, Paulette Bray-Bouquet, Gisèle Gunepin, Yvonne Jourjon, and Geneviève Lefevre-Seillier.

According to Imbreq in an interview, "most of the forty-something volunteers, who had not flown for almost five years, found themselves in mismatched flight suits that were very ill-suited to their size." She went on to describe the experience:

“At school with men, we had the same training. Among them were pilots who had been prisoners like Edmond Petit. The men admitted us without problems, we were comrades. We sympathized more or less, it depended because some were well behaved, others more irascible… We thought what we were doing would be useful for the future because we knew that for the most part we were already too old… Of these girls who were with me, hardly any remained in the Air Force apart from Elizabeth Boselli.”

On 12 February 1946, Lieutenant Imbreq obtained her fighter pilot's license (Patent No. 32941), but the special pilot training program for Air Force women ended later that year. Thereafter, doors to female military pilots remained closed until 1996 when women finally regained the opportunity to begin pilot training.

== Decorations ==
Imbreq was honored for her service from 1939 to 1945 as an Army and Red Cross pilot.

- Resistance Medal (1947)
- Knight of the Legion of Honor (1949)

== Bibliography ==
- The Aerophile: technical and practical review of aerial locomotion, vol. 401932.
- Air via (no 34), 1936.
- Raymond Caire, The Military Woman, 1981
- Johanna Hurni, Women in the armed forces, Effingerhof, 1992
- Jean-Michel Amirault, The Rich Hours of the Aero Club of France 1898-1998, 1998
- France. Air Force. Historical service, Oral history: macrothematic inventory. Volume 5, 2000
- Michel Klen, Women of War: A Millennial History, 2010
- Bernard Marck, Passionate about the air. Little story of light aviation, 2011
