= Gaucher RG.40 Week-End =

RG.40 Week-End
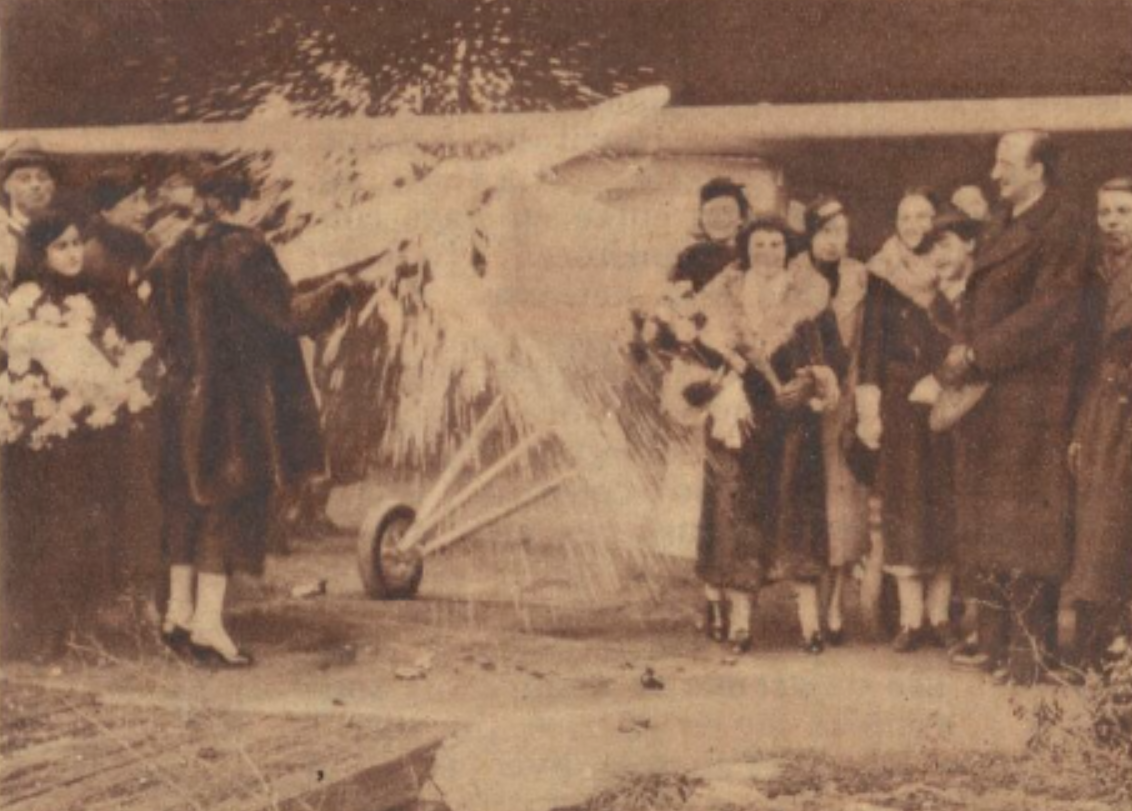
- Remy Gaucher "new aircraft" in 1935 and the "Helene Boucher year" at the EPF school

General information
- Type: Two seat, light sports aircraft
- National origin: France
- Manufacturer: Les avions légers économiques R.Gaucher
- Designer: Rémy Gaucher
- Number built: 3, including the RG.45

History
- First flight: June 1935
- Variant: SECAT VI La Mouette

The Gaucher RG.40 Week-End was a high-wing, two-seat, low-power, touring aircraft built in France in 1935. Three were built and later SECAT produced several rather similar designs, all from designer Rémy Gaucher.

== Design ==
The Gaucher RG.40 Week-End was announced in 1935 it was a light aircraft seating two side-by-side. It and its several descendants had engines in the 26–45 kW (35–60 hp) power range. It was the first aircraft designed by the new Les avions légers économiques R.Gaucher, though it was built at Ponthierry in Berthier's factory.

When the year group of the École polytechnique féminine (EPF) graduated in 1935 it was named after the aviator Helene Boucher who had recently died. Andrée Hoppilliard had been working for the Gaucher company and her involvement was mentioned when the Remy Gaucher's new aircraft was exhibited at the graduation ceremony in 1935.

Its high, cantilever wing was approximately elliptical in plan, though with a rectangular 4.0 m (13 ft 1 in) span central panel. The central section had constant thickness but the outer panels thinned from below to provide a little dihedral. It had wooden spars and ribs and was plywood skinned. Ailerons filled two-thirds of the span and there was a central, rectangular transparency to provide the pilot with an upward field of view.

It was planned to power the RG.40 with a 26 kW (35 hp) AVA 4A-02, an air-cooled, flat four, two stroke engine, mounted in the nose with cylinder-heads projecting for cooling, but the earliest flights were made with a smaller bore version, the 19 kW (26 hp) AVA 4A-00. The Week-End's rectangular cross-section fuselage had a wooden structure and was ply covered. The forward view from the cabin was through a long, one-piece transparency and the only sideways obstructions were the two pairs of vertical members that joined fuselage and wing. Cabin entry was via two large doors.

The empennage of the RG.40 was conventional, with a triangular tailplane mounted at mid-fuselage carrying well separated elevators. The vertical surface was triangular overall, with a small fin but a generous and pointed balanced rudder.

The Week-End had conventional, fixed landing gear with each mainwheel mounted on a stub axle provided with a torsional shock absorber. Each axle was at the convergence of three struts from the lower fuselage. There was a small tailskid.

== Development ==
The exact date of the Week-End's first flight is not known but it was undergoing early flight trials at the start of July 1935. At that time it was powered by the smaller, 19 kW (25 hp) AVA. Two had been built by early July and later that month, when the first Week-End's tests had proved very successful, a third example was under construction. This was to be powered by a Train 4T four cylinder, air-cooled, inverted in-line engine producing 30 kW (40 hp). It was designated the Gaucher RG.40T.

The date of the first flight of the Gaucher 40T is again unknown but it was flying by April 1936. It was at Villacoublay for its official tests in mid-June 1936.

André Gérard built a development of the RG.40, called the Gérard RG.45, Gérard-Gaucher 45 or Gérard Club-45, which flew for the first time on 20 October 1938.. Powered by a 34 kW (45 hp) Zlin Persy II flat-four engine, its span was increased to 9.8 m (32 ft 2 in), wing area to 14.5 m^{2} (156 sq ft) and empty weight to 310 kg (680 lb).

In 1938 Gaucher joined newly founded SECAT (Société d'Etudes et de Construction d'Avions de Tourisme) in Boulogne and designed a series of light aircraft very similar to the Week-End apart from their engines. The SECAT VI La Mouette, powered by a 45 kW (60 hp) Train 6T inverted six cylinder in-line engine, flew before World War II and was produced in a series of five, one of which survived the war as the SECAT S.4 La Mouette. The SECAT S.5 and SECAT RG.75 were post-war developments, powered by Régnier 56 kW (75 hp) 4D2 four cylinder, inverted in-line engines.

== Operational history ==
In 1936 the RG.40T competed in the two litre category of the annual Angers competition, in which the winner flew the furthest in a fixed time. Originally a 24-hour event, that of 1936 only lasted 6 hours because of increasing average speeds. Flown by Burrelli, the Gaucher was the slowest finisher, averaging 99 km/h (62 mph).

== Variants ==
Gaucher RG.40 Week-End
2 built, first flown 1935.

Gaucher RG.40T
As RG.40 but with 30 kW (40 hp) Train 4T engine, first flown 1936.

Gérard RG.45 Club
The RG.40 with 30 kW (40 hp) Persy II engine, first flown 1938.

== Specifications (RG.40) ==
Data from Les Ailes 4 July 1935

General characteristics

- Crew: One
- Capacity: one passenger
- Length: 5.5 m (18 ft 1 in)
- Wingspan: 9.0 m (29 ft 6 in)
- Height: 1.90 m (6 ft 3 in)
- Wing area: 13 m^{2} (140 sq ft)
- Empty weight: 255 kg (562 lb)
- Gross weight: 439 kg (968 lb)
- Fuel capacity: 35 L (7.7 imp gal; 9.2 US gal)
- Powerplant: 1 × AVA 4-02 4-cylinder, air-cooled flat four, 26 kW (35 hp) at 2,400 rpm. Maximum 30 kW (40 hp).
- Propellers: 2-bladed

Performance

- Maximum speed: 150 km/h (93 mph, 81 kn)
- Range: 500 km (310 mi, 270 nmi)
- Service ceiling: 3,500 m (11,500 ft)
- Rate of climb: 2.1 m/s (410 ft/min)
- Take-off speed: 55 km/h (34 mph)
- Performance figures were extrapolated from the results of early tests with the 19 kW (26 hp) AVA 4-00 engine
