= Andrée Hoppilliard =

French aeronautical engineer (1909–1995)

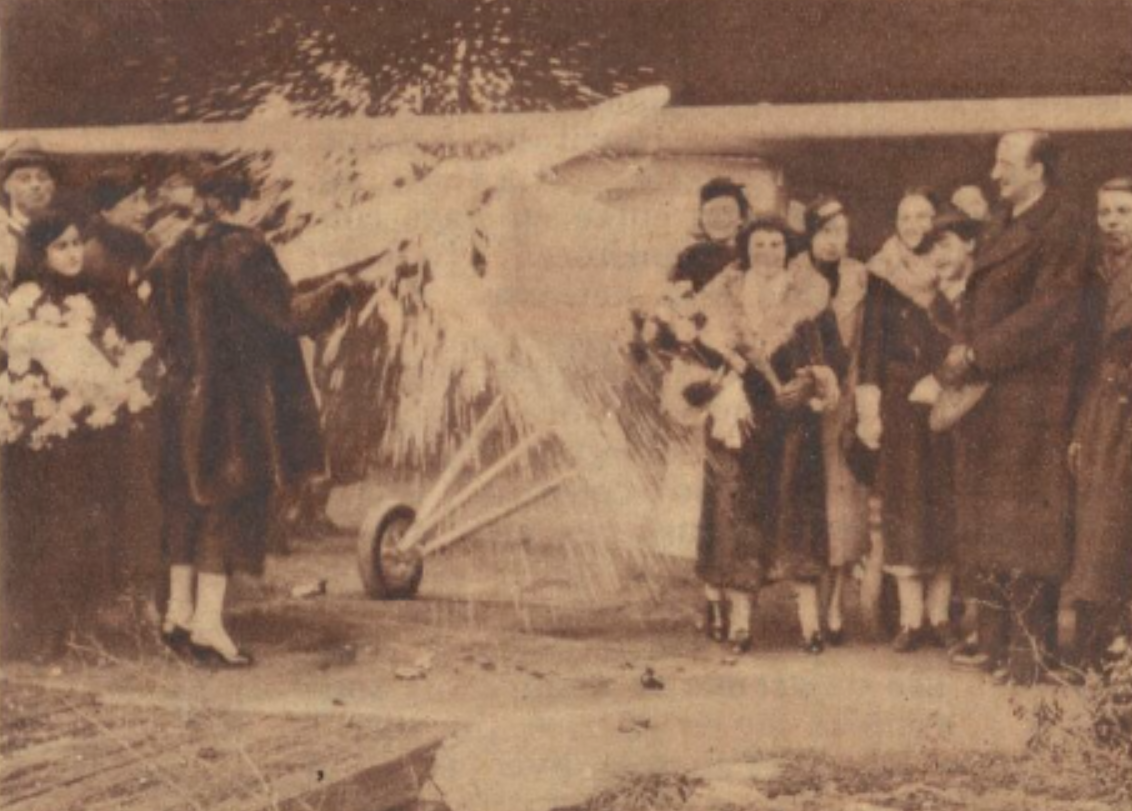
- The 1935 "Helene Boucher year" at the EPF school and the new Remy Gaucher aircraft
- Born: 27 February, 1909; Château-Thierry
- Died: 19 May, 1995 (aged 86); Cannes
- Education: École polytechnique féminine
- Known for: early woman engineer
- Engineering career
- Discipline: Aeronautics

Andrée Hoppilliard (27 February 1909 – 19 May 1995) was a French aeronautical engineer at a time when it was unusual for women to enter the profession. While still a student, in 1935 she helped the Gaucher company to launch a new aircraft known as Gaucher RG.40 Week-End. Her own graduation was celebrated on the occasion of its launch. Thereafter, and in the years up to the Second World War, she played a key role in designing and constructing new light aircraft for Gaucher. She is one of the 72 women whose names are planned to be added to the Eiffel Tower.

== Early life and education ==
Andrée Henriette Valentine Hoppilliard was born on 27 February 1909 to Cléanthe Henriette Dubois and Lucien Hoppilliard in Château-Thierry in the Aisne department. Her parents were teachers. Her father died in 1915, having been called up as an infantry soldier early in World War I. In January 1921, Hoppillard became a Ward of the Nation, one of the children adopted by the nations who lost a parent due to World War I. She lived through World War I when there were the first moves to allow women to be involved in engineering.

In 1929, Hoppilliard was the leader of the Fédération française des éclaireuses group in the Lycée français de Jeunes Filles de Mayence.

Hoppilliard graduated from the École Polytechnique Féminine (EPF) in 1935. Her year group chose to name their 'promotion' after the aviator Helene Boucher who had recently died in an accident. In December 1935, in connection with Boucher's death, Marie-Louise Paris, founder of the EPF said she considered Hoppilliard, now director of Gaucher's light aircraft, to be one of her most brilliant students. After a meeting at the Saint-Cyr Aerodrome, combining the memory of Boucher with the recent graduation of the school's engineers and the promotion of a new aircraft, the two women drove the same evening to Boucher's monument in Yermenonville where they laid a magnificent bouquet of white lilies and pink carnations.

== Career ==
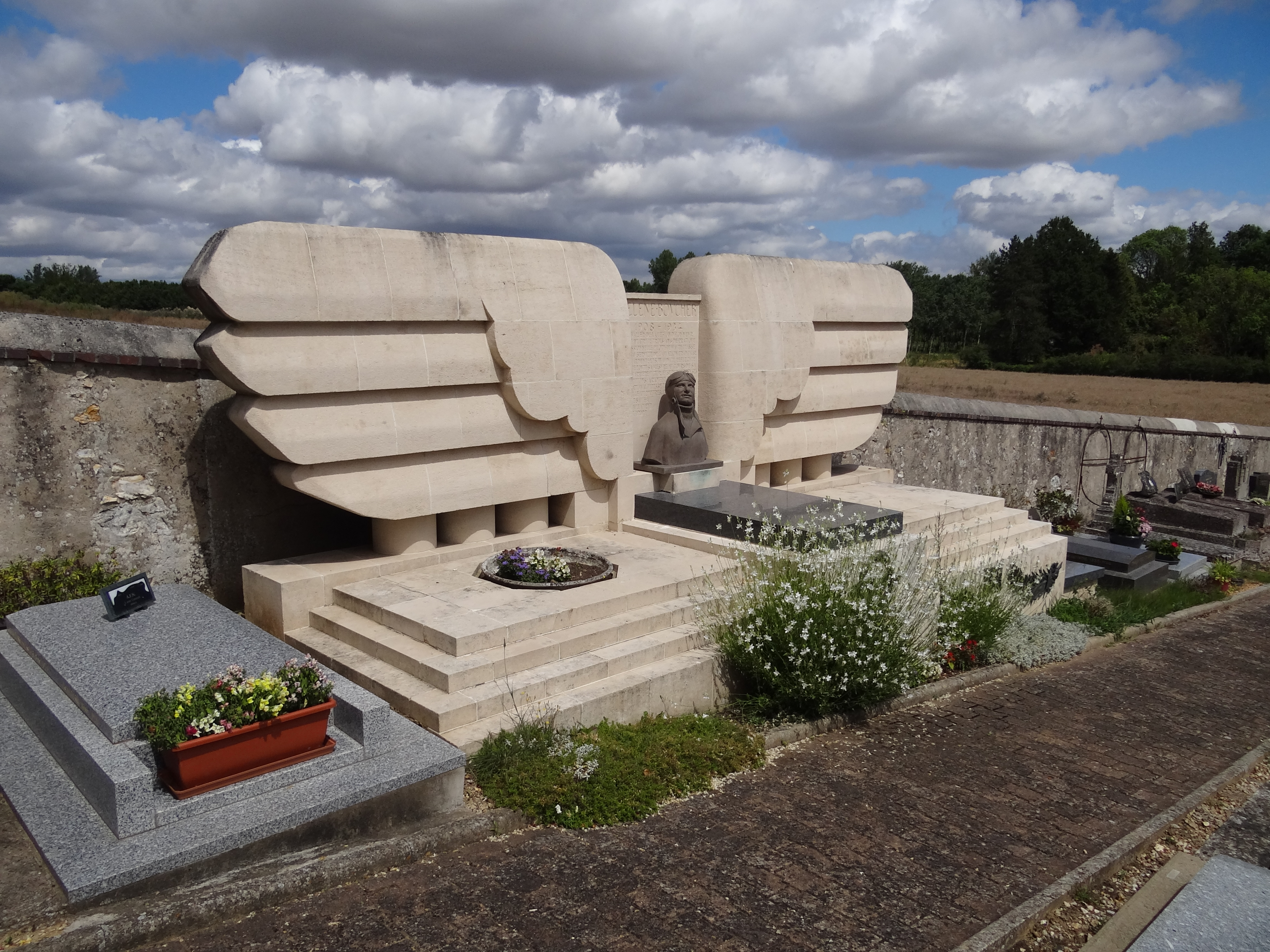
Hélène Boucher's monument

Hoppilliard had worked for the Gaucher company whilst still a student and her involvement was mentioned when a new aircraft was announced in 1935. The unveiling of the aircraft was paired with the graduation ceremony of the "Helene Boucher promotion" class, held at the Saint-Cyr airfield. The Gaucher RG.40 Week-End was a light aircraft, seating two side-by-side, painted in blue and silver. The aircraft was christened Tatouka, a Malagassy word, during the ceremony. After the ceremony, Hoppilliard and Mme Paris drove to Yermenonville to place a bouquet of lilies and white carnations which had been on the plane at the Hélène Boucher monument.

Hoppilliard specialised in aircraft construction, and played a key role in overseeing the construction of light aircraft for Gaucher during the inter war period. She headed Gaucher's light aircraft construction department in the late 1930s.

Hoppilliard was the first President of the EPF alumnus association.

== Personal life ==
Andrée Hoppilliard married Michel Félix Boutroy in 1941.

Hoppilliard died on 19 May 1995 in Cannes, Alpes-Maritimes, aged 95.

== Honours ==
Hoppilliard was one of four women from the EPF who were included in the list of 72 women who are to named on the side of the Eiffel Tower. The other three are Marie-Louise Paris, Colette Kreder and Georgette Délibrias. The plan was announced by the Mayor of Paris, Anne Hidalgo following the recommendations of a committee led by Isabelle Vauglin of Femmes et Sciences and Jean-François Martins, representing the operating company which runs the Eiffel Tower.
