= Élisabeth Boselli =

French fighter pilot (1914–2005)

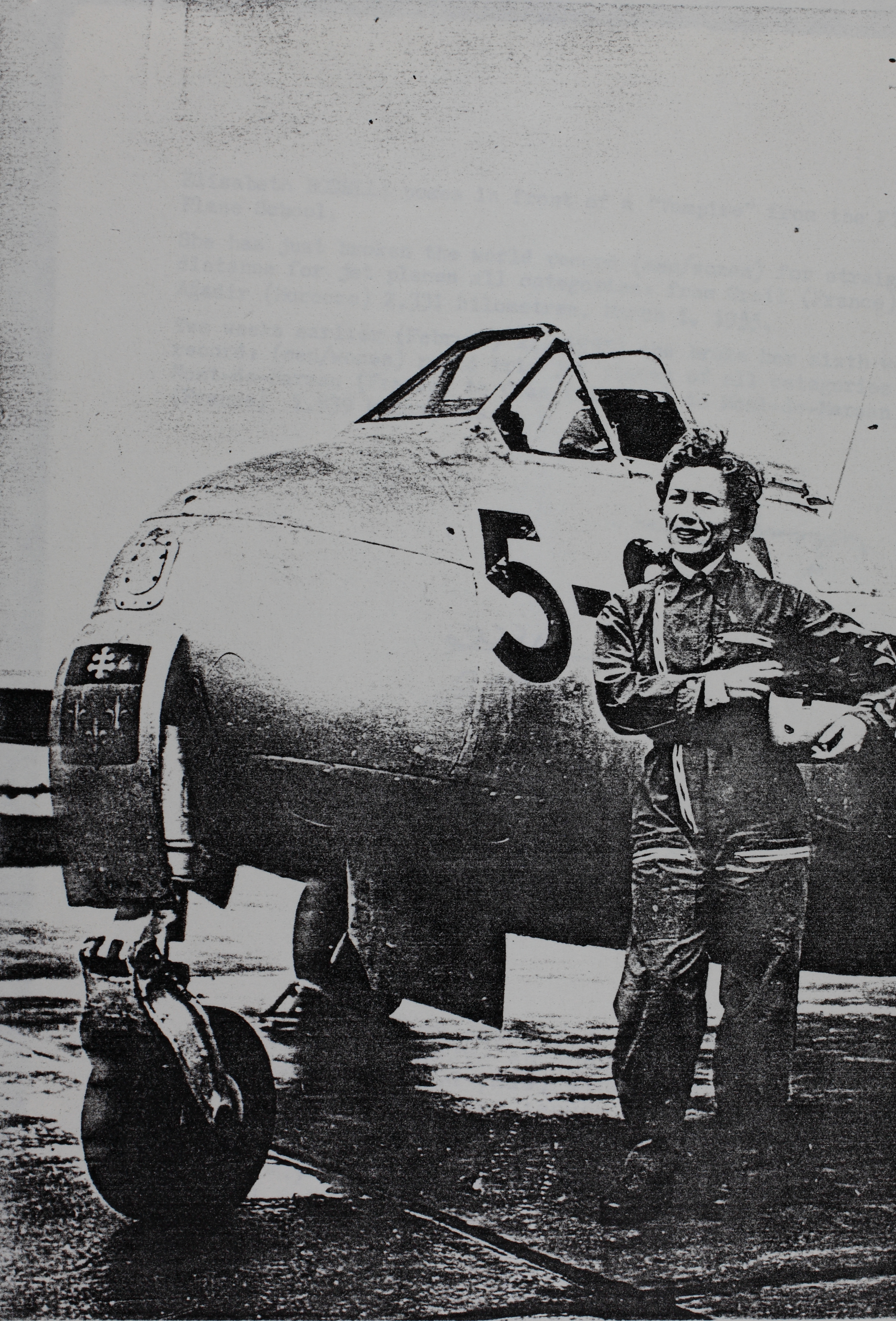
- Born: March 11, 1914; Paris, France
- Died: November 25, 2005 (aged 91); Lyon, France
- Resting place: Guillotière Cemetery

Élisabeth Thérèse Marie Juliette Boselli (11 March 1914 – 25 November 2005), was a French military and civilian pilot. She was the first female fighter pilot to serve in the French Air Force, and held eight world records for distance, altitude, and speed.

== Early life ==
Élisabeth Boselli was born in Paris on 11 March 1914. She studied at École des Sciences Politiques in Paris and graduated in 1935. While a student, she was involved in various humanitarian organizations, including the Red Cross.

== Flying career ==
She became interested in aviation after attending an aviation conference with her brother. Initially she volunteered at air fields, working in hangars and on engines, until in January 1938 she obtained her private pilot's license. She purchased her own aircraft, a Leopoldoff, began training in aerobatics, and decided to earn her public pilot's license. However, World War II broke out and all civilian training was cancelled; Boselli's flight log from that period ends on 4 August 1939.

In 1944-45, Charles Tillon, newly appointed Minister of the Air in the government of Charles de Gaulle created the Premier corps de pilotes militaires féminins (corps of female military pilots), and invited thirteen pilots, including Boselli, Maryse Bastié, Andrée Dupeyron, Maryse Hilsz, Élisabeth Lion, Suzanne Melk, Anne-Marie Imbrecq, Paulette Bray-Bouquet, Gisèle Gunepin, and Yvonne Jourjon to join. Boselli trained at Châteauroux. Boselli had the rank of second lieutenant. She was trained in aerobatics and became a trainer herself. On February 12, 1946, she received her military pilot's license, becoming the first woman in France to do so. As the war had ended, however, female pilots were not needed and she was offered an administrative position instead. Boselli declined, and chose to return to civilian aviation.

In May 1947 she began training as a glider pilot under Paul Lepanse at Beynes, obtaining her licence four months later. Boselli immediately began to enter competitions, setting a number of records. In 1951, Boselli visited the United States of America and met a pair of seaplane pilots who offered her the opportunity to fly a seaplane; she completed her training in 10 days and successfully achieved a seaplane pilot license.

Boselli returned to the military in 1952, joining a presentation squadron of aerobatic pilots based at Étampes called Patrouille de France. Boselli and the squadron performed in Monaco, Algeria, and Spain, with Boselli as one of the solo performers. In 1957, she was offered an assignment in Algeria, which she accepted. She was based at Oued Hamimine, and flew military evacuations, transport missions, and delivered supplies and mail to troops.

By the age of 45, she had accumulated 900 flight hours and 335 missions, and ceased flying. She spent the remainder of her career as an attaché-editor in the air navigation service until her retirement in 1969.

In her retirement, Boselli was president of the history committee of the Aero Club of France, and wrote her memoirs.

Boselli died in Lyon on 25 November 2005, and is buried in Guillotière Cemetery.

== Records held ==
- World women's altitude records for single glider: reached 5,300 m on December 22, 1947, and 5,600 m on April 6, 1948
- World altitude record for light aircraft: 5,791 m on May 21, 1949
- World women's speed record for closed-circuit jets: 746 km/h on January 26, 1955
- World women's distance record for closed-circuit jets: 1,840 km on February 21, 1955
- World record for distance in a straight line for jet aircraft: 2,331.22 km on March 1, 1955

== Recognition and commemoration ==
For her services to her country, she received the Legion of Honor, the Cross for Military Valour and the Aeronautical Medal.

There is a street in Lyon named after Boselli. A park near the Porte de Versailles in Paris is named after her. In 2013, a housing estate was built on a former airfield in Angers, and was named the Boselli neighbourhood.
