= Andrée Dupeyron =

French aviator

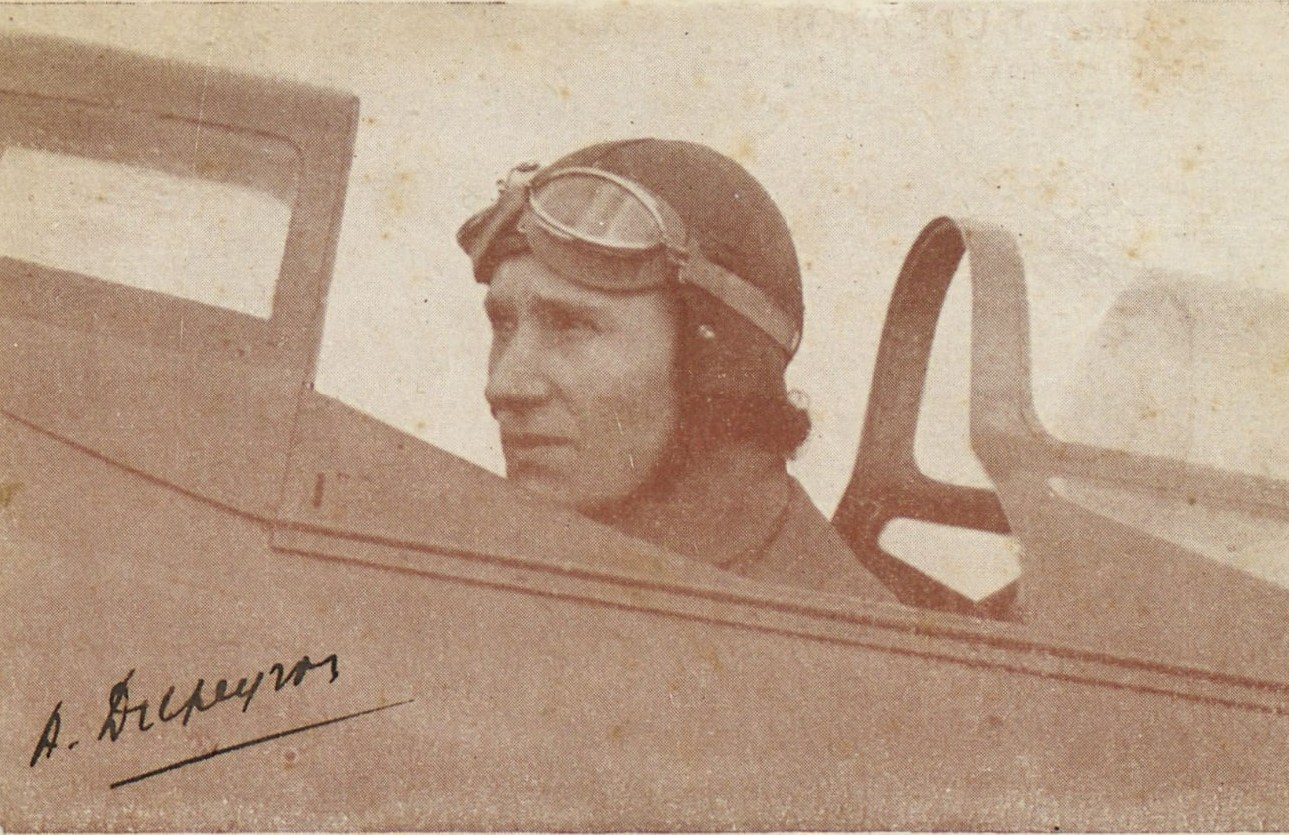
- Born: Julie Victorine Andréa Eugénie Mailho; 19 October 1902; Ivry-sur-Seine, Paris, France
- Died: 22 July 1998 (aged 95); Mont-de-Marsan, France
- Occupation: Aviator

Andrée Dupeyron (née Mailho; 19 October 1902 – 22 July 1988) was a French woman civil and military aviator who broke distance records in the 1930s and flew for the Free French Air Force and the Premier corps de pilotes militaires féminins.

== Early life ==
Julie Victorine Andréa Eugénie Mailho was born on 19 October 1902 in Ivry-sur-Seine, Paris, the daughter of a working-class family. Her father died fighting in the First World War and in 1916 she started work in a munitions factory making ammunition shells. She met her future husband, the mechanic Gustave Dupeyron, at the age of 16 when he was working at the Ecole d'Aviation de Pau. They married at the end of the First World War. Passionate about mechanics, the couple soon became interested in aircraft.

In 1920, after the birth of their first child, René, the Dupeyron family moved to Gustave's home town of Mont-de-Marsan in Landes and settled there, having a daughter Jacqueline. They opened a car repair shop and then bought a garage in Dax. The Dupeyrons agreed that Andrée would look after the latter and Gustave would manage the workshop in Mont-de-Marsan. When he could, he spent time at the Aéro-club des Landes next door to the workshop. The aeroclub had been created in 1928 by Henri Farbos. The aviation bug caught the whole family and they bought a plane, a Potez 43. Gustave Dupeyron earned his pilot's licence in 1932, followed by Andrée in 1933. She was the second woman pilot at the Aéro-club de Mont-de-Marsan after the famous aviator Hélène Boucher.

== Flying career ==
Andrée Dupeyron earned her amateur pilot's licence and then her professional pilot's licence.

The couple sold their garage in Dax and set up an aircraft repair workshop in a hangar in Mont-de-Marsan. Andrée Dupeyron upgraded her plane to a Caudron Aiglon, better suited to her ambition of breaking the straight-line distance record. In 1936 and 1937, she took part in the Hélène Boucher Cup race and the Mont-de-Marsan - Marseille - Tours - Paris international rally.

On 16 May 1938, Dupeyron broke the women's record for non-stop straight-line distance. She flew 4,360 km (2,710 mi) from Oran in Algeria to Tel El Aham in Iraq in a Caudron C-600 Bengali 6.351 l aircraft, a civilian tourist aircraft converted to fly long distances. She beat the women's straight-line distance record recently set by Élisabeth Lion. She ended up stranded in the desert.

On 31 December 1938, Dupeyron broke another record, for distance in a straight line without landing, flying 1,678 km (1,043 mi) from Tunis in Tunisia to Mersa Matroh in Egypt in the same aircraft.

Achieving these world records made the 36-year-old mother a heroine throughout the France. She was nicknamed La mère de famille volante for her speed.

With her husband, Dupeyron was one of the first to join the Aviation Populaire des Landes club, founded in 1936 at the instigation of the Front Populaire, which sought to promote and establish aviation among the working classes.

== Second World War ==
With the outbreak of the Second World War, Dupeyron enlisted in 1939, and after being demobilised with the Fall of France, she joined the Resistance. She flew as a pilot in the Free French Air Force during the Second World War and was sponsor of a squadron that bore her name. One of her sons was also a military pilot in the Free French Air Forces. She hid the co-pilot of an American B17 in an attic in Place Saint-Roch, Mont-de-Marsan.

Dupeyron's life story inspired Jean Grémillon's 1944 film Le ciel est à vous (The Woman Who Dared in English) which was made during the Nazi occupation of France during the Second World War.

Charles de Gaulle's Air Minister, Charles Tillon, wanted to create a corps of female military pilots. During the winter of 1944–1945, Dupeyron was part of the first group of women pilots recruited for the Premier corps de pilotes militaires féminins (First Corps of Female Military Pilots) alongside Maryse Bastié. Dupeyron trained at Kasba-Tadla Air Force School in Morocco, alongside Paulette Bray-Bouquet, Gisèle Gunepin, Élisabeth Lion and Yvonne Jourjon, and qualified as a military pilot in 1945 with the rank of second lieutenant. In 1946 she became a student pilot at the Gliding Centre of Montagne Noire (France), the only woman in training there.

== Post war ==
In 1949, she made another record attempt, flying from Mont-de-Marsan in France to Jiwani in Pakistan. She flew 5,932 km (3,686 mi) alone, after 31 hours and 23 minutes. Andrée Dupeyron was awarded the Légion d'honneur that same year.

Andrée Dupeyron died on 22 July 1988 and was buried in the cimetière du Centre de Mont-de-Marsan.

== Commemoration ==
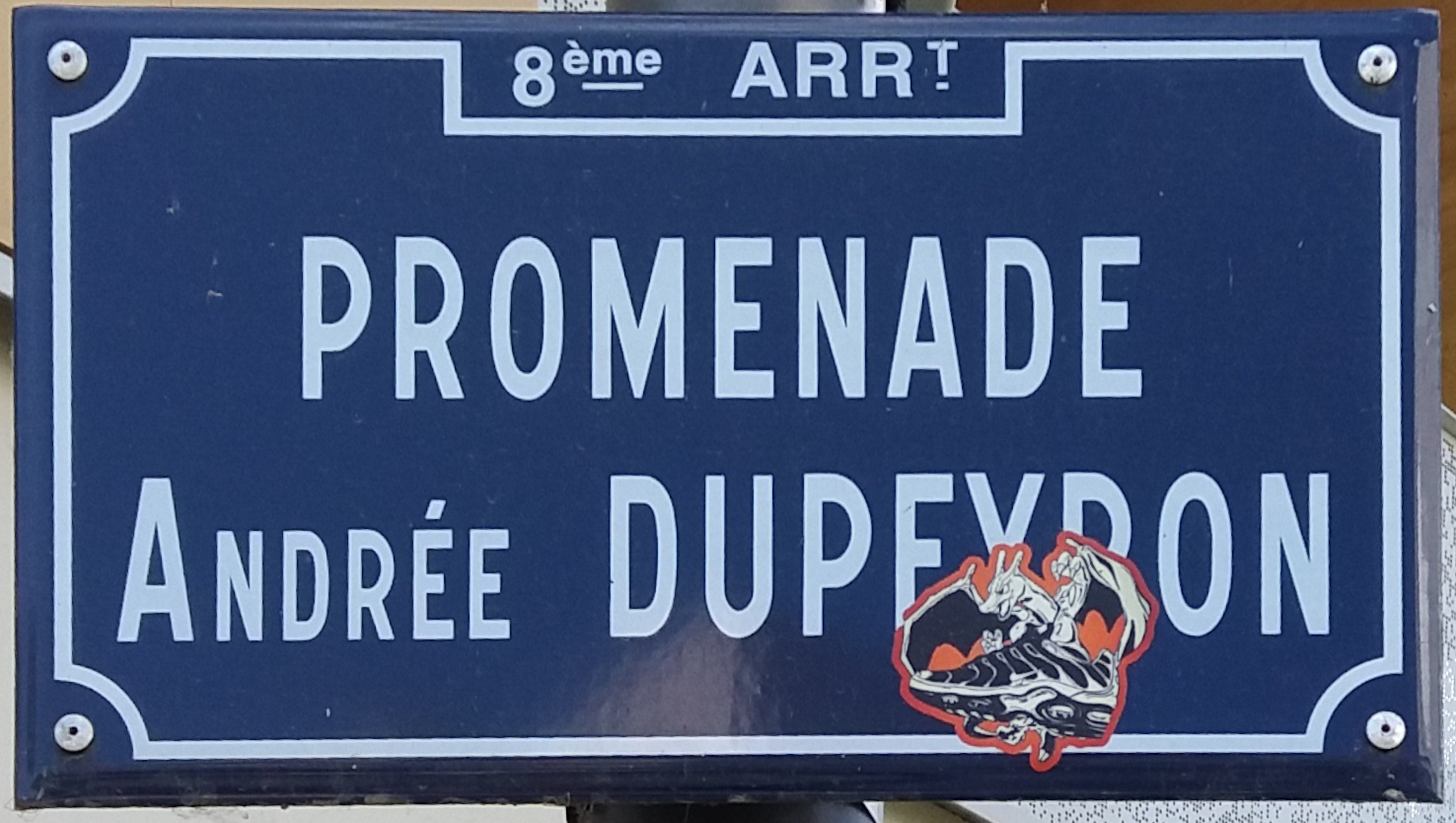
Lyon 8e - Promenade Andrée Dupeyron - Plaque (retouchée)

Promenade Andrée Dupeyron, a road in Lyon, is named in her honour.

A roundabout on Simone Veil boulevard in Mont-de-Marsan was named after Andrée Dupeyron in 2019, alongside two other roundabouts named for fellow women pilots Elisabeth Boselli and Adrienne Bolland.
