= Claire Roman =

French aviator

Claire Roman (born Claire-Henrietta Emilia Chambaud) (25 March 1906 – 8 August 1941) was a French aviator. In the 1930s she participated in speed races and broke world records for altitude and speed, and completed a long-distance flight to India. During World War II Roman served in the French Air Force and was captured by the Germans. She escaped and continued to fly until her death in 1941 as a passenger on a civilian flight which crashed in bad weather.

== Early years ==
Claire-Henrietta Emilia Chambaud was born in Mulhouse, Grand Est, France on 25 March 1906, Louise (née Schwartz) and Paul Chambaud, an industrialist. Her maternal uncle Henri Schwartz ran a woollen mill in Mulhouse but was murdered in front of his factory, after which her father took it over. She was sent to England at the age of 16 to learn the English language, and on her return to France studied philosophy at the Sorbonne University. She also studied nursing, graduating in 1927.

== Adult life ==
In 1929 Roman married Serge Roman, a veteran of World War I. He committed suicide in March 1932, and Roman joined the International Red Cross Movement as a nurse. She was assigned to Meknes, Morocco, where she became fascinated with aviation, and in November 1932 she earned her pilot's licence.

== Flying career ==
The following year she returned to Paris to live, and joined flying clubs and learnt to fly other aircraft such as the Caudron C272, the Morane-Saulnier and the Potez 43. In 1934 she went to England and learnt night flying. The following year she competed in the inaugural Hélène Boucher Cup, flying a SFCA Maillet 20, finishing second behind Maryse Hilsz and ahead of Yvonne Jourjon in third place. In 1936 she was also second, behind Hilsz, in that year's cup race.

In December 1937, Roman broke the international women's altitude record by flying to an altitude of 6,782 metres. The following day she also broke the world women's speed record by reaching a speed of 245 km/h. The same year, she completed a long-distance flight from Paris to Pondicherry, India with her friend Alix Lucas-Naudin.

== Second World War ==
At the outbreak of World War II, Roman volunteered to join the French Air Force. In September 1939, she and three other pilots, Maryse Hilsz, Maryse Bastié and Paulette Bray-Bouquet were requisitioned to ferry planes to the front for the Air Force.

In June 1940 Guy La Chambre signed a government decree permitting women pilots to join the French Air Force as an auxiliary pilot, and Roman was one of the first to sign up.

She was responsible for evacuating aircraft from behind German lines, and while performing this work was captured by the Germans in Brittany. She escaped to Bordeaux and resumed her duties there.

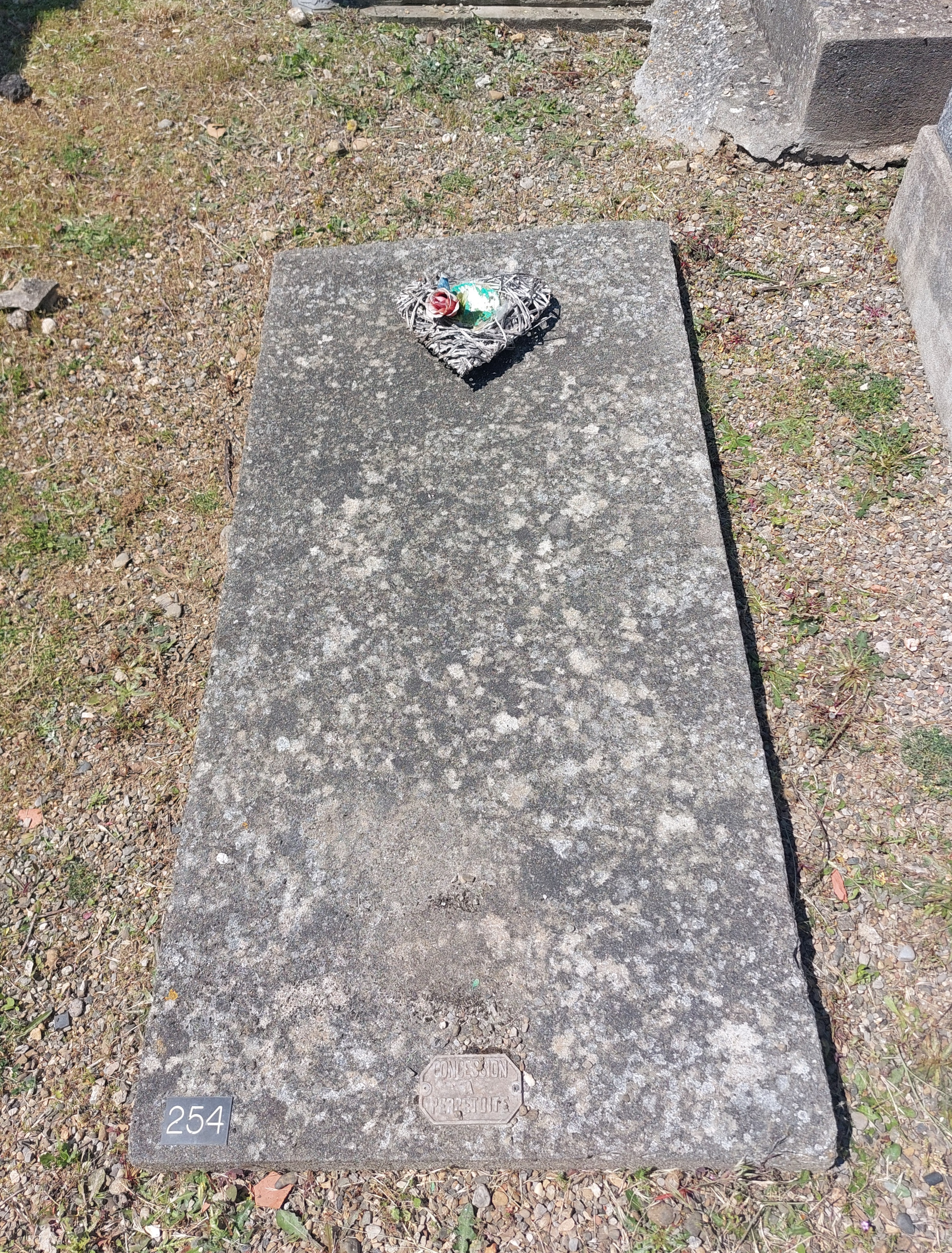
Gravestone of Claire Roman in the Cimetière Saint-Vincent in Carcassonne

In August 1941 Roman's mother fell ill in Pau, in the Pyrénées-Atlantiques region, and Roman travelled as a passenger in a civilian aircraft to visit her. The plane crashed in the mountains of the Lapradelle-Puilaurens area in bad weather, and Roman was killed, aged 35.

== Commemoration ==
In 2017, an exhibition on Roman's life and achievements was opened at an aeronautical museum in Blagnac, including items found in June 2016 at the site of the crash which killed Roman in 1941.
