= Marie-Louise Paris =

Founder of the EPF École d'ingénieurs (1889–1969)

- Mademoiselle Paris
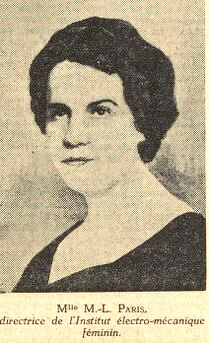
- Excelsior newspaper 2 July 1935
- Born: 20 October 1889; Besançon
- Died: 28 April 1969 (aged 79); Sceaux

Marie-Louise Paris (20 October 1889–28 April 1969), known as Mademoiselle Paris was a French engineer who founded the Institut électro-mécanique féminin (the Women's Electro-mechanical Institute) in 1925, which became the École Polytechnique Féminine (Women's Polytechnic) and is now the EPF School of Engineering. In 2026 she was named as one of the 72 women to have their names engraved on the Eiffel Tower.

== Biography ==
Marie-Louise Paris was born in Besançon in 20 October 1889 as the oldest of a family of six children. Although her father died while she was young she managed to complete a bachelor's degree in science at the Sorbonne in Paris. She followed her sister Hélène there and graduated as an engineer in 1921 from the School of Mechanics and Electricity. They both then graduated in 1922 from the Grenoble Institute of Technology under the supervision of Louis Barbillion.

Hélène Paris married and remained in Grenoble but Marie-Louise Paris returned to the city of Paris where she spent time working on the installation of the signaling service for Laon station. Paris associated with people from the colleges, engineers and scientists such as Gabriel Koenigs, the professor at the faculty of sciences in Paris, Paul Langevin, the director of the l'École centrale, Léon Guillet, Léon Eyrolles, director of the School of Public Works, Paul Appell, rector of the l'Académie de Paris, and Edouard Branly. With their association and support, Marie-Louise Paris was able to legitimise the creation of a tertiary level college reserved for women.

== Founding a school ==
Based on her own experiences in Grenoble, where there were only four women in a class of 605 students, Paris set about developing a college for women. In 1925, she arranged for the amphitheater of the Conservatoire national des arts et métiers (CNAM) to be used to house the l'Institut électro-mécanique féminin (Women's Electro-Mechanical Institute). The Institute opened to students on 4 November 1925. Initially, Paris and two teachers provided all the teaching in the school. Gabriel Koenigs taught technical drawing and mechanics. Marie-Louise Paris was invited to the 7th Congress of Industrial Chemistry to discuss women's access to industrial careers as a result of her innovations.

In 1933, Paris changed the name of the school to the École Polytechnique Féminine (Women's Polytechnic College) and the length of the course was extended from two to three years. In the following years, the school left the CNAM and was based in the lycees of La Fontaine, Jules-Ferry and Janson de Sailly until 1956 when Paris bought a building for the school in Sceaux. She lived on site. Paris designated pilots Hélène Boucher and Maryse Bastié were patrons of the school and later pilot and aircraft designer Henri Farman became a sponsor.

== Personal life ==
Paris learned to fly in a Caudron at Guyancourt aerodrome. She designed a prototype private plane which she displayed at an aviation show in 1936. She died of diabetes in her home at the school on 28 April 1969.

== Legacy ==
One of the buildings of the current EPF School of Engineering bears her name and there is a statue of her on the school campus. In Grenoble, a tram station which was renamed Marie-Louise Paris on 2 September 2019.

In 2026, Marie-Louise Paris was announced as one of 72 historical women in STEM whose names were proposed to be added to the 72 men already celebrated on the Eiffel Tower. The plan was conceived by a student and tour guide named Bernard Rigaud and the list was announced by the Mayor of Paris, Anne Hidalgo following the recommendations of a committee led by Isabelle Vauglin of Femmes et Sciences and Jean-François Martins, representing the operating company which runs the Eiffel Tower.
