= Sonia de Borodesky =

French writer

Sonia de Borodesky (sometimes spelled "Borodaewsky"; 21 August 1926 – 4 February 1999) was a Vietnamese-born French Resistance member during the Second World War and the first woman in France to become a professional mariner.

== Biography ==
She was born in Saigon. Her father's family, the Princes Borodesky, were Ukrainian nobility; he was an officer in the Imperial Russian Navy, who fled to Poland after the Russian Civil War, and then became a businessman in French Indochina, where he met and married Sonia's French mother.

Sonia de Borodesky joined, first, the Resistance, and then the First Army commanded by Jean de Lattre de Tassigny.

After the war, Borodesky married Fernand Vasseur, a French naval officer, and they had five children. Following their divorce, she became a "marin pêcheur", running her own trawler, the Voluntas Dei, and entered the École nationale de la Marine marchande, hitherto an all-male preserve. In doing so, she defeated the Loi Colbert, a 17th-century law that prohibited women from going on board ship, achieving a formal victory by a ruling of January 1963. She acquired two further fishing vessels, the Rodolphe Maryse and the Tantaé

in 1972, she married Amédée Delouteau, a fisherman and former Resistance member. Delouteau had an artificial leg, resulting in his being nicknamed "patte d'alu" (aluminium leg).

Sonia de Borodesky wrote several autobiographical articles. Her novel, La Houle, published by Julliard, Paris, in 1959, was translated into English as The surge of the sea (Robert Hale, 1961) and into Portuguese as A Vaga (Portugalia editora, 1961). The book won the Prix Maryse Bastié.
