= Château de la Guignardière =

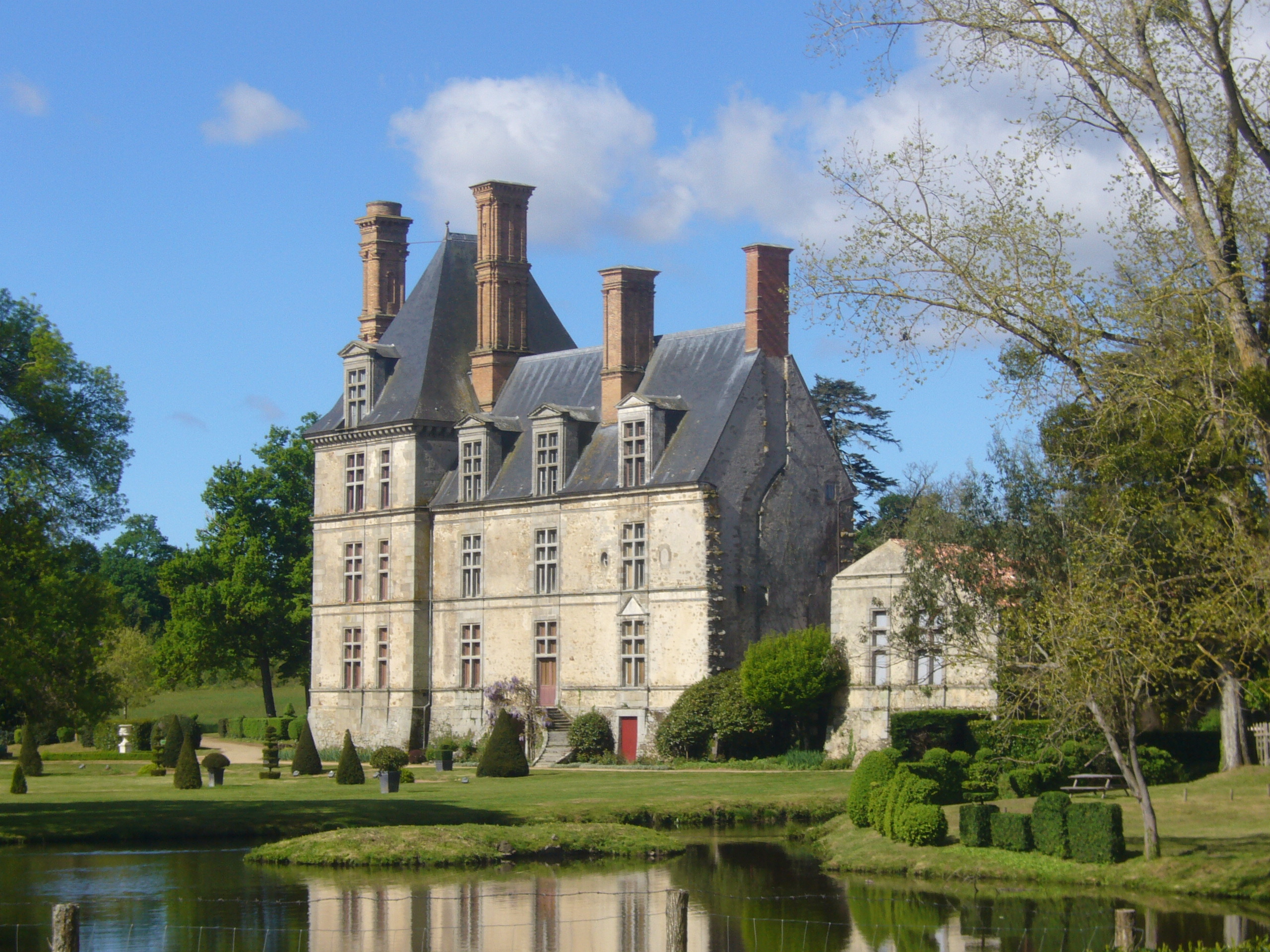

- Location within France
- 46.474°N 1.51°W
- Location: Avrillé, Vendée, France

History
- Built: 1555
- Built for: Jean Girard

Site notes
- Architectural style: French Renaissance

Monument historique
- Designated: 28 December 1978
- Reference no.: PA00110021

The Château de la Guignardière (French pronunciation: [ʃato də la ɡiɲaʁdjɛʁ]) is a 16th-century château located outside Avrillé, in the Vendée department, western France. It was begun in 1555, but was never completed. The building and park are open to the public.

== History ==
The château was begun in around 1555 for Jean Girard, panetier, or breadmaster, to King Henri II. It was planned as a symmetrical building, flanked by tall wings. However, in 1563, Girard was assassinated, and the building site was abandoned. The master masons, who had been imported from Paris by Girard, dispersed across the local area, influencing the designs of several buildings in the area.

Further building was not carried out until the 18th century, when Sylvestre, Count of Chaffault, attempted to complete it. Ionic pilasters were added to the principal windows, surmounted by a pediment inscribed with the Count's armorial bearings and the date 1773. Gardens were laid out, and the large pond excavated. However, the Count, a royalist, was forced to flee the country following the arrest of Louis XVI during the French Revolution. During his absence, a republican mob plundered the château, defacing the armorial bearings, and killing the Count's children.

By the early 19th century the château was owned by the Marquis de Saint Denis, a keen agricultural improver. He transformed the gardens, and planted numerous exotic trees, including Magnolia, Swamp Cypress, Zelkova and California Redwood. His successor Henri Luce de Tremont also hoped to complete the château, but instead he chose to move the curved perron stair from the proposed central bay of the garden facade, to the actual central bay. From 1920, the statesman Georges Clemenceau rented a house, known as la bicoque, ("the shack") on the estate. He became friends with the owner, Amedée Luce de Tremont, and was regularly entertained in the dining room of the château. La bicoque is now a state property, and is open to the public as the Maison de Georges Clemenceau. The château remains privately owned, and is now open to the public. It has been classed as a monument historique since 1978.

== Architecture ==
The château is an example of French Renaissance architecture. It comprises a three-bay section of three storeys, the proposed central block, and a tall wing of four storeys. The steeply-sloping slate roofs are supported on the original oak timbers, felled on the estate and dated by dendrochronology to 1556. The roofs are topped by very tall red-brick chimneys. Each window has a mullion and two transoms, made of granite, as are other decorative features. The interiors include large granite fireplaces, probably modelled on published designs by the Italian architect Sebastiano Serlio.

== Parc des Aventuriers ==
The 86-hectare (210-acre) gardens of the château have been developed as the Parc des Aventuriers, a children's adventure trail and treasure hunt, based on the history of world exploration. Within the park are a number of prehistoric menhirs, as well as more recent garden features.
