= SECAT VI La Mouette =

General information
- Type: Two seat tourer
- National origin: France
- Manufacturer: SECAT

History
- First flight: Before December 1938

The S.E.C.A.T.-VI La Mouette or S.E.C.A.T. 60T La Mouette (French: The Seagull) was a French two seat tourer built shortly before the outbreak of World War II.

== Design ==
SECAT (Société d'Etudes et de Construction d'Avions de Tourisme) were established in Boulogne in 1938. During that year they produced the Type VI, a low powered, high wing cabin monoplane with side-by-side seating for two.

Its one piece cantilever wing had spruce plywood box spars and ribs and was okoumé plywood covered. It was attached to the upper fuselage longerons at six points and had a 4 m (13 ft 1 in) centre section of constant chord and thickness. Beyond, the wing thinned from its underside, creating positive dihedral and became semi-elliptical in plan. Long (2.8 m (9 ft 2 in), more than 60% of the half-span) ailerons, unusually mounted inboard and gently decreasing in chord outboard, produced an overall wing plan close to the ideal ellipse.

Like the wing, the rectangular section fuselage had a wooden frame and was ply covered. It had a 45 kW (60 hp), six cylinder, inverted, air cooled, Train 6T inline engine in the nose, driving a two blade propeller and fed from a 55 L (12 imp gal; 15 US gal) tank in the wing. The two side-by-side seats, provided with dual control, were in an enclosed cabin under the wing leading edge with glazing ahead, in the two side doors sides and above, with a panel in the wing centre section. The fuselage tapered to the rear to a tall vertical tail which had a straight edged fin and a straight edged, round topped balanced rudder which reached down to the keel. The curved edged tailplane, mounted low on the fuselage, carried unbalanced elevators cut away centrally for rudder movement. Like the rest of the aircraft the empennage was wood framed and ply covered.

La Mouette had a steel tube tailskid undercarriage with a track of 1.90 m (6 ft 3 in). The mainwheels, enclosed by fairings were on a split axle from the fuselage centre, joined through rubber shock absorbers to faired-in V-struts from the lower fuselage longerons.

== Development ==
The date of the first flight of the S.E.C.A.T. VI is not known. It first came to public attention in December 1938 with an attempt on the world distance record for aircraft with engines of less than 2.0 L (120 cu in) capacity, which ended with a mechanical failure. It gained its Certificate of Airworthiness (CoA) in June 1939.

By July, production of a series of five was under way, though it is not known how many were completed. Airframe no.2, initially registered F-W134, became F-PAAM on receiving its CoA and survived the war. No. 3, F-PEAB, was registered post-war as a SECAT S.4 La Mouette and the post-war SECAT S.5 was a development. Both the S.5 and the SECAT RG-75 were very similar to the S.4 apart from having Régnier 4D.2 56 kW (75 hp) engines.

== Specifications ==
Data from Les Ailes 28 June 1939

General characteristics

- Crew: Pilot
- Capacity: One passenger
- Length: 5.5 m (18 ft 1 in)
- Wingspan: 9.0 m (29 ft 6 in)
- Height: 2.2 m (7 ft 3 in)
- Wing area: 14 m^{2} (150 sq ft)
- Empty weight: 330 kg (728 lb)
- Gross weight: 550 kg (1,213 lb)
- Fuel capacity: 55 L (12 imp gal; 15 US gal)
- Powerplant: 1 × Train 6T inverted, air cooled, 6 cylinder inline, 45 kW (60 hp) nominal CV
- Propellers: 2-bladed Merville

Performance

- Maximum speed: 150 km/h (93 mph, 81 kn)
- Cruise speed: 140 km/h (87 mph, 76 kn)
- Range: 450 km (280 mi, 240 nmi) at cruising speed
- Service ceiling: 3,500 m (11,500 ft) practical
- Rate of climb: 4.2 m/s (830 ft/min) initial
