= EPF Engineering School =

EPF logo

EPF Engineering School (EPF École d'ingénieurs), formally known as École polytechnique féminine (EPF), is one of 204 French state accredited engineering schools awarding engineering degrees. When founded in 1925, it was the first educational institution in France to train women engineers. It counts many exceptional women amongst its alumnae including some among the 72 women scientists to be named on the Eiffel Tower.

== History ==
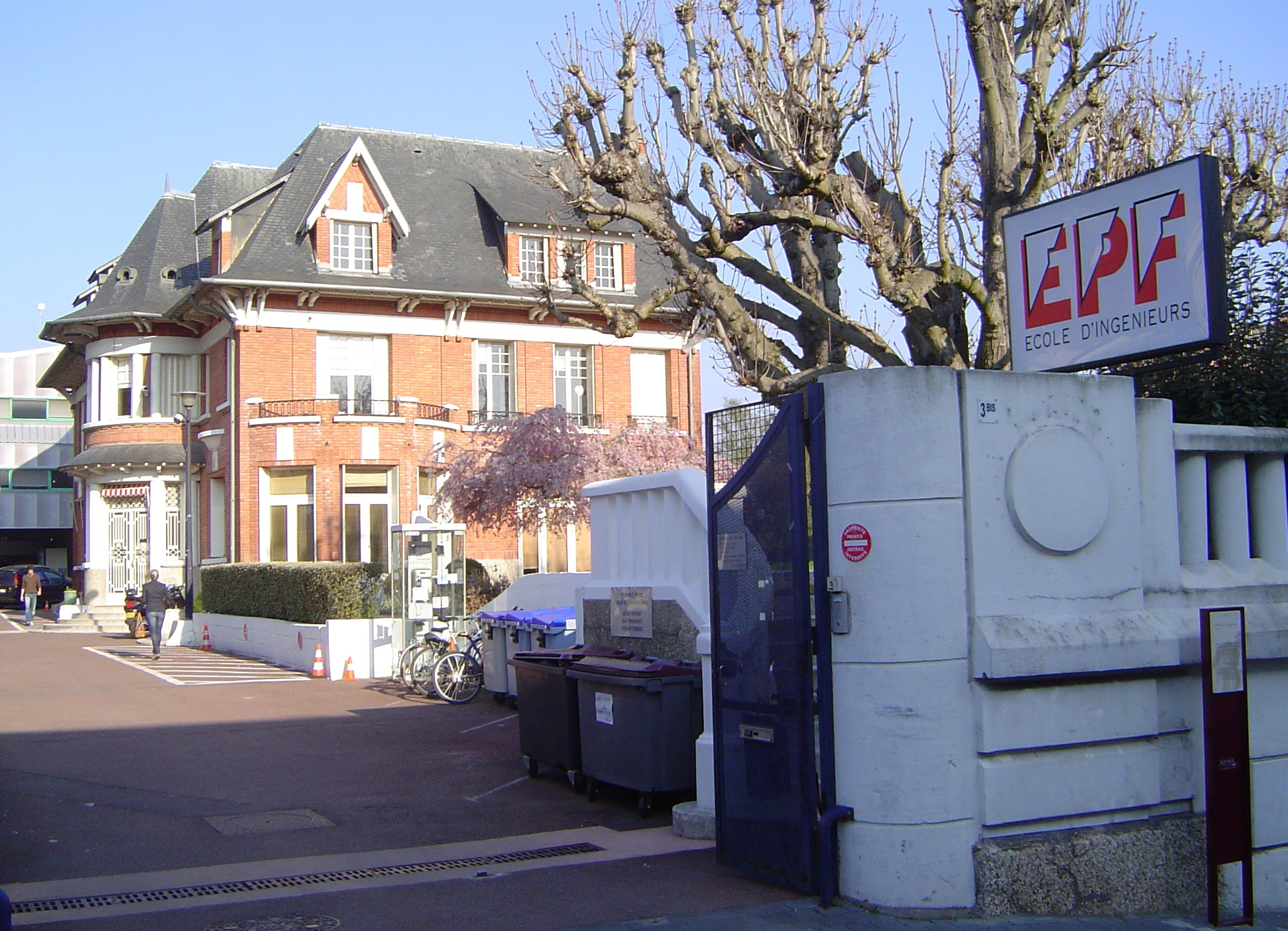
The original building in Sceaux

In 1925, the school, then called the Institut électromécanique féminin (IEF), was founded by the engineer Marie-Louise Paris in order to train young women for a degree in electromechanical engineering. The offerings included a short programme preparing them for positions as draughtswomen and assistant engineers. In 1933, the IEF became the École polytechnique féminine (EPF) or Women's Polytechnic School, moving from two to three years of study and adding an aeronautics department. In 1938, the school was authorised to award a degree in engineering. In 1943, it was recognized by the French State. In 1956, the school moved to Sceaux in the suburbs south of Paris.

In 1964, 45% of women who obtained an egineering degree had graduated from IEF or EPF. In 1976, EPF became a member of the Conférence des grandes écoles (CGE). In 1991, the school became a recognised public-benefit foundation. In 1993, it joined the Union of Independent Grandes Écoles (UGE!). As more schools opened their doors to women wishing to study engineering, EPF became co-educational, changing its name from École polytechnique féminine to École d'ingénieurs or EPF Engineering School in 1989. It started to take in male students in 1994 but still has the highest percentage of female students of French engineering schools.

New campuses were established in 2010 and 2012 in Troyes and Montpelier, in 2022 in Cachan (Val-de-Marne) and in Saint-Nazaire (Loire Atlantique) in 2023. One was also established in Dakar, Senegal in 2023. The school is a member of the Conférence des directeurs des écoles françaises d'ingénieurs (CDEFI) and the Université de Champagne consortium. This institution trains students to be engineers in all sectors of industry at both degree and apprenticeship level and helps with internships.

== Alumni ==
The founder of EPF herself and some of the alumni below featured in the list of 72 women scientists put forward for inclusion on the Eiffel Tower.

- Marie-Louise Paris (1889–1969), French engineer who founded the l'Institut électro-mécanique féminin (now the EPF) in 1925
- Georgette Délibrias (1924–2015), French physicist who pioneered the technique of radiocarbon dating
- Colette Kreder (EPF 1957), French entrepreneur and feminist, co-founder of the Demain la Parité network and the Association of Femmes et Sciences, director of the school from 1980 to 1994
- Andrée Hoppilliard (1909–1995), French aeronautical engineer who helped design light aircraft for the Gaucher company
- Martine Rottier (EPF 1979), French judoka, world champion in 1982 and double European champion in 1975 and 1976, ten times French champion in the under 61 kg category, knight of the national order of Merit .
- Nelly Trumel (non-graduate), French painter and libertarian feminist.
- Marie-Anne Clair (EPF 1982), French engineer at the National Centre for Space Studies and later director of the Guiana Space Centre .
- Aude Bono (EPF 1985), French politician and physicist, Member of Parliament for Aisne .
- Isabelle Mashola (EPF 1988), French businesswoman specializing in information technology, co-founder and manager of the startup Isahit in the field of social entrepreneurship.
- Astrid Guyart (EPF 2006), French Olympic fencer ( foil ), aerospace engineer and children's author .

== Books ==
- Maryse Barbance, De l'École polytechnique féminine à l'EPF école d'ingénieures 1925-2005, 80 ISBN 978-2-212-11716-5
