= Georgette Délibrias =

French scientist (1924–2015)

- Born: 15 August 1924; Paris, France
- Died: 29 April 2015 (aged 90); Fontenay-lès-Briis
- Education: Ecole Polytechnique Féminine de Paris
- Known for: Radiocarbon dating
- Scientific career
- Fields: Nuclear physics
- Workplaces: Commissariat à l’Energie Atomique (CEA)

Georgette Délibrias (15 August 1924 – 29 April 2015) was a French physicist. She pioneered and publicized the new technique of radiocarbon dating and contributed to French nuclear research through the Commissariat à l'énergie atomique (CEA). She had a related interest in archaeology which led to her applying radiocarbon dating in Brazil to demonstrate that the country was populated some 32,000 years ago, rather than only 13,000 as previously believed.

== Early life and education ==
Délibrias was born in the 14th arrondissement of Paris on 15 August 1924. She studied at the École Polytechnique Féminine (EPF) in Paris, where she graduated as a physicist in 1946.

== Career ==
Following her graduation, she was recruited by the Commissariat à l'énergie atomique et aux énergies alternatives (CEA) where she made her career. While working on the divergence testing of Zoé, France's first nuclear reactor in 1948, she developed neutron detectors that were constructed using boron trifluoride. She moved on from looking at alpha aerosols with Jacques Labeyrie to gain an early interest in the ability of using carbon 14 to achieve the dating of ancient objects. They achieved the first published example of radiocarbon dating at the CEA.

She headed the ß-laboratory at Gif-sur-Yvette which was established by the CEA and the CNRS in 1961. It was dedicated to the emerging technology of radiocarbon dating which would in time deal with 8,000 different samples, covering geologic, marine and archaeological research. She took an early interest in dating sea level variations, developing small counters to date the various steps of the last deglaciation by examining the biological carbonate fraction in marine cores. This led to the first publication of the chronology of the North Atlantic deglaciation.

Her example led to the creation of several other laboratories that could exploit carbon-14 dating. These included the Senegalese lab in Dakkar created by Cheikh Anta Diop, Shawki Nakhla's facility in Egypt, J. M. Flexor in Brazil and O. Ramouni in Algeria. She coordinated the dating of over 8,000 samples in her laboratory, covering her research into geology, oceanography and archaeology. In connection with the dating of variations in sea level dating, she developed small counters able to date steps recorded in marine cores from the last deglaciation by measuring the biological carbonate fraction.

Délibras played a highly significant role in French nuclear research. In addition to her own achievements, she helped numerous young researchers with the development and testing of their hypotheses. As leader of an important radiocarbon laboratory, she was able to accumulate an extensive knowledge database which has continued to attract interest.

=== Interest in archaeology ===
Above all Délibrias was profoundly interested in archaeology, especially the environmental settings of hominids. In 1964, she reported on the results of wood dating from Angkot temples and in the 1990s published La préhistoire dans le monde. Collaboration with her colleague Nicole Petit-Maire on archaeology and environmental conditions revealed the existence of a much wetter period in the Sahara between 8000 and 4000 BC, which has since been firmly established.

In the early 1950s, given her interest in the New World, she began collaborating with the Brazilian archaeologist Niède Guidon. This soon led to her establishment of a coastal chronology as well as to the dating of the central regions of Brazil, showing that they were populated as early as 32,000 BC when it was believed that the oldest date was 13,000 years. She helped set up carbon-14 dating facilities in Brazil, Senegal, Egypt and Algeria. She is credited with making radiocarbon dating ubiquitous.

Délibrias died on 29 April 2015, aged 80, in Fontenay-lès-Briis in the Essonne department of northern France.

== Honors ==
In 2026, Délibrias was announced as one of 72 historical women in STEM whose names have been proposed to be added to the 72 men already celebrated on the Eiffel Tower. The plan was announced by the Mayor of Paris, Anne Hidalgo following the recommendations of a committee led by Isabelle Vauglin of Femmes et Sciences and Jean-François Martins, representing the operating company which runs the Eiffel Tower.

== Selected publications ==
Georgette Délibras published widely. Significant publications include:

- Premières datations absolues de trois gisements néolithiques cambodgiens
- Elements de chronologie des éruptions de la Chaîne des Puys
- La grotte de la Baume de Gonvillars
- La grotte de la Tuilerie à Gondenans-les Montby
- (1976) IXè Conférence Internationale du Radiocarbone et correction des dates 14. in collaboration with Jacques Évin, Jean Thommeret, Yolande Thommeret
- La lithostratigraphie des sediments hemipelagiques du delta profond du fleuve Congo et ses indications sur les paleoclimats de la fin du Quaternaire
- Gif Natural Radiocarbon Measurements IX
- Paléoenvironnements du Sahara: lacs holocènes à Taoudenni, Mali
- La préhistoire dans le monde
- Radiocarbon dating on Echo Micadas, LSCE, Gif-Sur-Yvette, France: New and Updated Chemical Procedures
