= Suzanne Melk =

French aviator

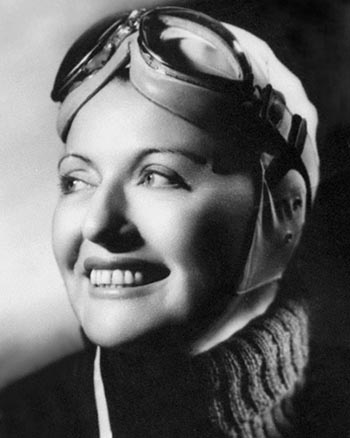
- Melk in 1950.
- Born: March 17, 1908; Navenne, France
- Died: February 4, 1951 (aged 42); Durham, North Carolina, U.S.
- Spouse: Jean Dreyfus (m. 1935—1950)
- Aviation career
- First flight: 7 June 1935 in a Hanriot HD.32
- Flight license: 1935 (powered); 1938 (gliders)

Suzanne Melk (March 17, 1908 — February 4, 1951) was a French pilot and female aviation pioneer. Melk received a pilot's license in 1935.

== Early life ==
Melk was born in Vesoul, Bourgogne-Franche-Comté, France. She grew up in both Navenne and Vesoul. Melk and her three siblings, a brother and two sisters grew up on a farm where their family made wine and grew tobacco. Melk worked at a local hardware store in her teens. Her hobbies at the time included playing the piano and making artwork.

At the age of 12 Melk grew fascinated with aviation after seeing biplanes flying near her childhood farm.

== Aviation career ==
Melk began flying in 1935 and earned her pilot's licence that same year. She trained on a repaired Hanriot HD.32 and in 1937 she passed her exam to become an instructor. After this Melk trained dozens more women to fly at a field near Orly Airport. During World War II Melk volunteered as an ambulance driver transporting injured members of the French Resistance.

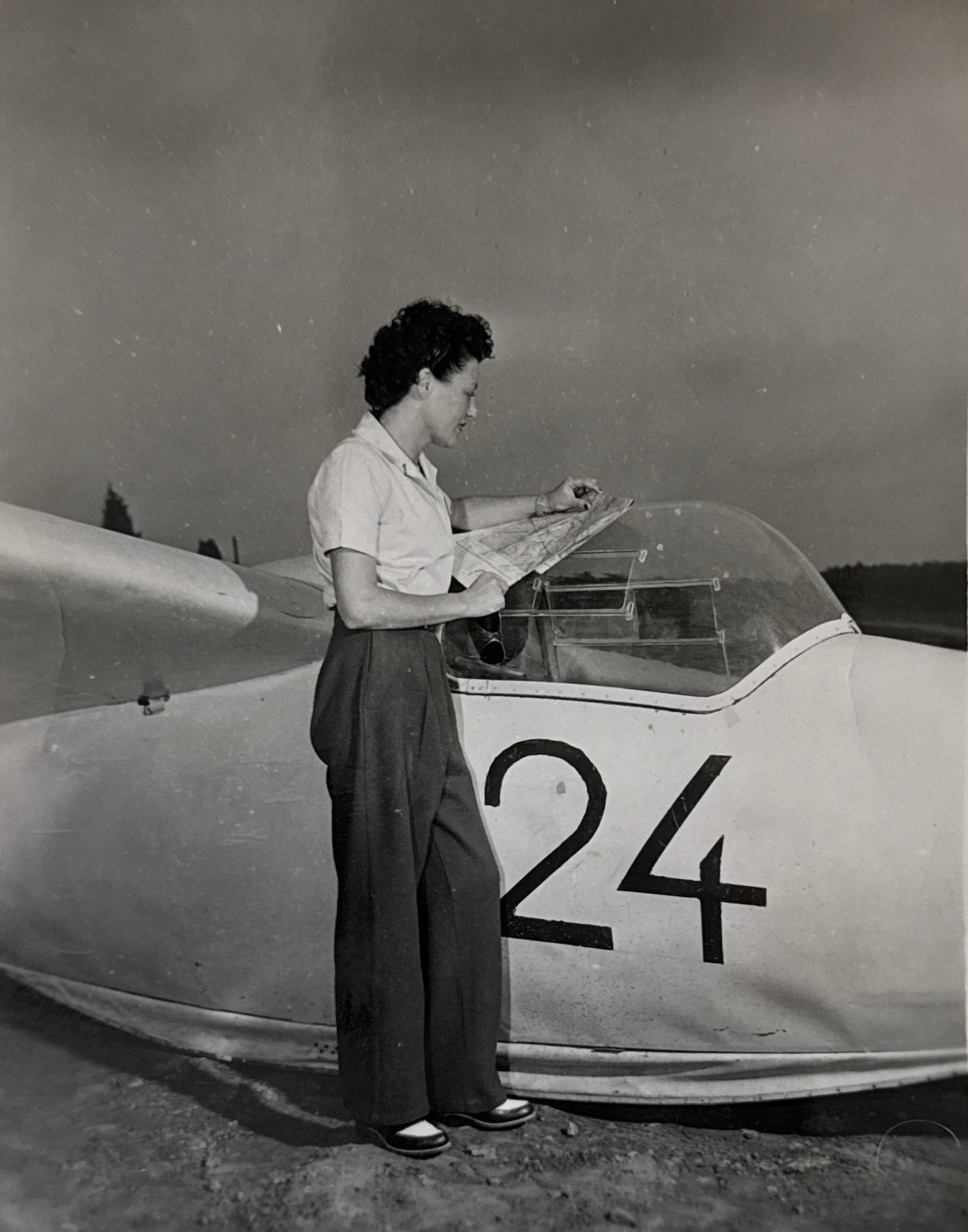
Suzanne Melk checking a map while statding next to her glider

Melk, along with Élisabeth Boselli, flew the Nord Pingouin and others after this Melk joined the French Air Force. She and Boselli were the only two women to ever fly the Dewoitine D.520. After flying fighters for a few years after the war, Melk grew more interested in gliders. In 1944 she received her glider license. In 1946 Melk began to be invited to European Gliding championships. On March 26, 1947, Melks won the European Gliding Duration championship with a flight of 16 hours and 3 minutes. Two days later she won the speed competition, reaching 311 mph. After competing in the European glider circuit Melk moved to the United States in July 1947 to compete in North America.

When Melk moved to the US to compete she was usually the only woman competing. In the final months of 1947, as Melk struggled to finish in the top ten at any gliding event, she had a breakthrough. At the 1948 Trophy of Sanford competition in Florida Melk scored 128 points over two days finishing second and winning a $4,000 cash prize.

== Death and legacy ==
Melk was in Durham, North Carolina for an event when she began feeling ill. She complained of a harsh pain in her stomach after a trip to the doctor's office Melk was told she was just having abdominal pain. On February 2 her pain increased and she was unable to walk. Later that day doctors determined that her kidneys were failing. Upon hearing the news a good friend donated blood and offered one of his kidneys; however, on February 4, 1951, Melk died in hospital. After an autopsy the cause of death was determined to be kidney failure.

== Awards and records ==
=== Records ===
National records:

- Longest Glider Flight — 16 hours, 43 minutes
- Highest altitude in a Glider — 3,950 m (12,959 ft) approved

World records:

- Highest Altitude in a Glider — 4,200 m (13,779 ft) not approved

International Honors

- FAI Gold Air Medal nominee

Domestic Honors

- Resistance Medal
- Order of Civil Merit
- National Order of Merit
- Michelin Cup nominee

== See also ==
- List of aviators
- List of women aviators
- The Ninety-Nines: International Organization of Women Pilots
- Women in aviation
