= Avrillé, Vendée =

Avrillé
- Commune
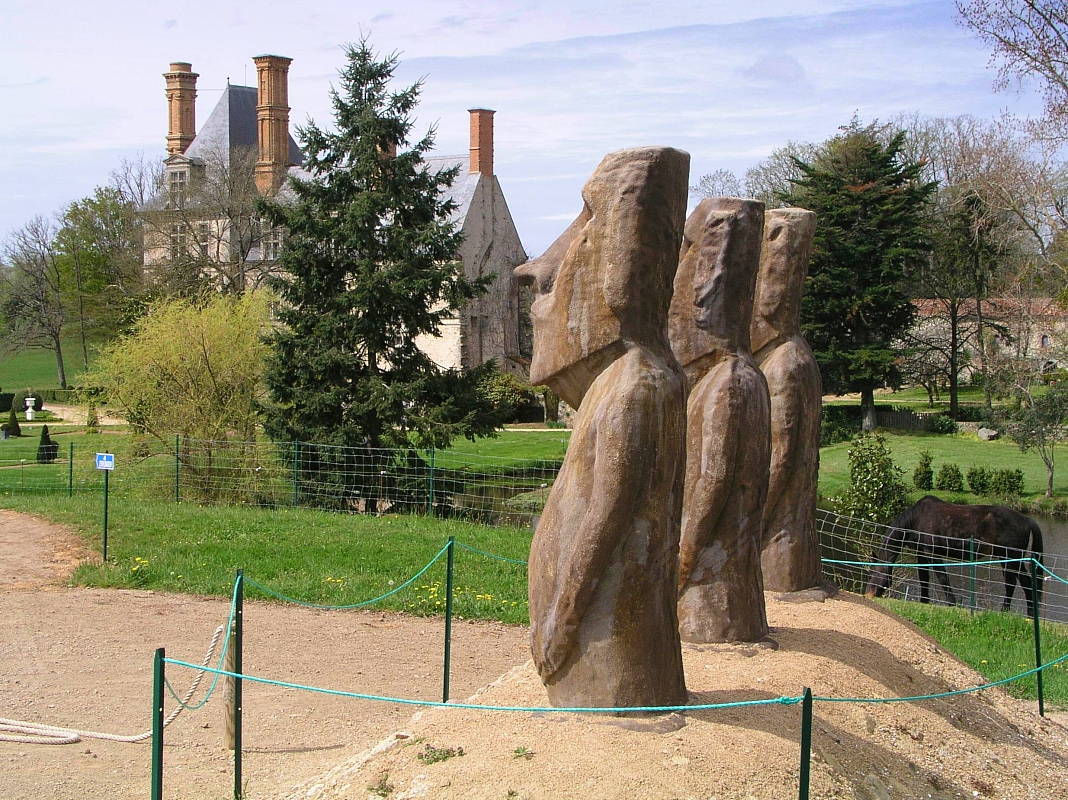
- Moai in the grounds of the Château de la Guignardière
- Location of Avrillé
- Location within France Location within Pays de la Loire
- Coordinates: 46°28′15″N 1°29′34″W
- Country: France
- Region: Pays de la Loire
- Department: Vendée
- Arrondissement: Les Sables-d'Olonne
- Canton: Talmont-Saint-Hilaire
- Intercommunality: Vendée Grand Littoral

Government
  - Mayor (2023–2026): Sylvie Verdon
- Area^{1}: 25.03 km^{2} (9.66 sq mi)
- Elevation: 50 m (160 ft)
- Highest elevation: 64 m (210 ft)
- Lowest elevation: 2 m (6.6 ft)
- Population (2023): 1,403
  - Density: 56.05/km^{2} (145.2/sq mi)
- Time zone: UTC+01:00 (CET)
  - Summer (DST): UTC+02:00 (CEST)
- INSEE/Postal code: 85010 /85440
- ^{1} French Land Register data, which excludes lakes, ponds, glaciers > 1 km^{2} (0.386 sq mi or 247 acres) and river estuaries.

Avrillé (French pronunciation: [avʁije]) is a commune in the Vendée department in the Pays de la Loire region in western France.

The 16th-century Château de la Guignardière is located just outside the town.

== See also ==
- Communes of the Vendée department
