= Maryse Hilsz =

French aviator

Marie-Antoinette "Maryse" Hilsz
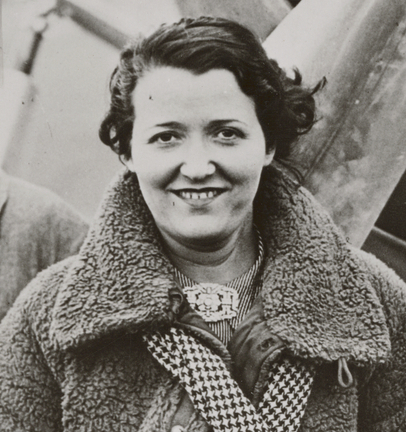
- Born: March 7, 1901; Levallois-Perret
- Died: January 30, 1946 (aged 44) outside Bourg-en-Bresse

Maryse Hilsz (7 March 1901 – 30 January 1946) was a French aviator known for high altitude and endurance flights. She served with the French Resistance during World War II and died in an air crash in 1946.

== Early life ==
Marie-Antoinette Hilsz was born on 7 March 1901 in Levallois-Perret and was known as Maryse. Her parents came from Alsace, her father worked as a dyer and her mother as a linen maid. She had to end her education early in 1916 after her father died in an accident. Hilsz went to work with her mother as a milliner in a dressmaking workshop to help support her two siblings.

After the end of the First World War, she explored airfields and attended airshows as civilian flying restarted. Parachute jumps were the big attraction at the meetings, and the parachutists were very well paid for risky work. She was inspired to get a pilot's licence, but flying and training was very expensive and her family could not afford the fees. In 1924, she entered a parachute jumping competition, even though she had never been in a plane before.

== Flying career ==
Following her first jump, aged 21, Hilsz took up exhibition parachuting and stunt performing on behalf of the Société pour le développement de l'aviation (making more than 112 jumps, including twenty double jumps). She stood on wings of flying planes as well as making jumps. She suffered two parachuting incidents: hanging from a roof by her parachute, and later spent two hours suspended by her braces from the top of a tree until someone could unhook her. These jumps for public entertainment helped to finance the training she needed to earn her pilot's licence, which was officially awarded on 21 April 1930.

In 1933 she shared the Fédération Aéronautique Internationale "Woman of the Year Award" with Amelia Earhart, and was the winner of the Harmon Trophy the same year. She had only been flying since 1930.

She established a new women's altitude record of 14,309 m (46,946 ft) on June 23, 1936. In 1936 she won the Hélène Boucher Cup flying a Breguet 270 Series.

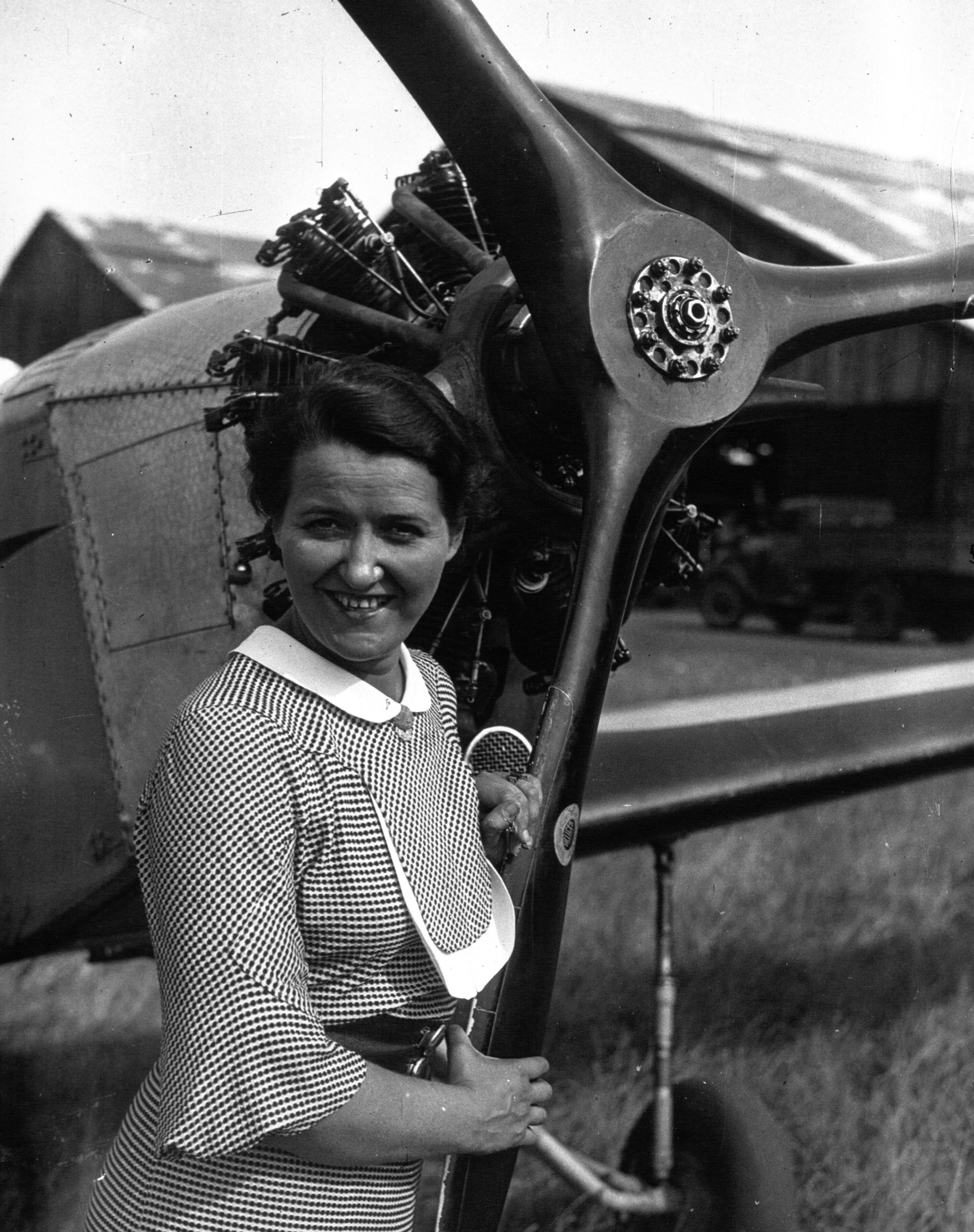
Maryse Hilsz with her Mauboussin M.122 in 1935

In September 1939, she and three other pilots, Maryse Bastié, Claire Roman and Paulette Bray-Bouquet were requisitioned to ferry planes to the front for the French Air Force.

== Death and legacy ==
She and three other crew members died in an air crash of their Siebel Si 204 at Bourg-en-Bresse on 30 January 1946.

== Notable flights ==
Date	Record
September 9, 1931	Completed long distance flight of Paris - Saigon - Paris
August 19, 1932	Set new women's altitude record at 10,000 m (33,000 ft)
April 28, 1934	Flight between Paris - Tokyo - Paris over 30,000 km (19,000 mi) distance in a Breguet.
June 17, 1934	Set new women's altitude record at 11,800 m (38,700 ft)
June 23, 1936	Set new women's fixed-wing aircraft altitude record at 14,309 m (46,946 ft) in a Potez 506
December 23, 1937	Set new Paris - Saigon time of four days
