= SECAT S-5 =

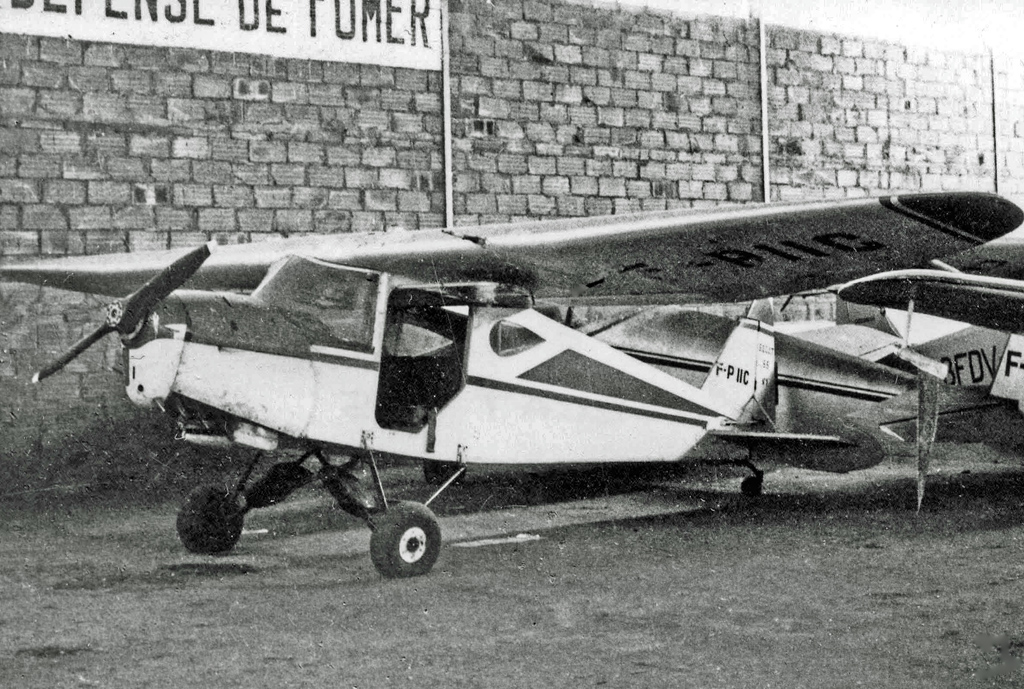
- The sole SECAT S-5 at Toussus-le-Noble Airport near Paris in 1967

General information
- Type: Training and touring
- National origin: France
- Manufacturer: Société d'Etudes et de Construction d'Avions de Tourisme
- Designer: Rémy Goucher
- Primary user: private pilots
- Number built: 1

History
- Introduction date: 1946
- First flight: 1946
- Developed from: SECAT S-4 Mouette

The SECAT S-5 was a light, high-wing, two-seat touring monoplane aircraft, designed and built by the Société d'Etudes et de Construction d'Avions de Tourisme in France shortly after the end of World War II. Only one example of the type was ever built, and it flew for a variety of private owners for several decades.

== Development ==
Société d'Etudes et de Construction d'Avions de Tourisme (SECAT) had been established in the late 1930s, and in 1938 had built the two-seat, high-wing S-4 Mouette, the development of which was interrupted by the hostilities.

== Design ==
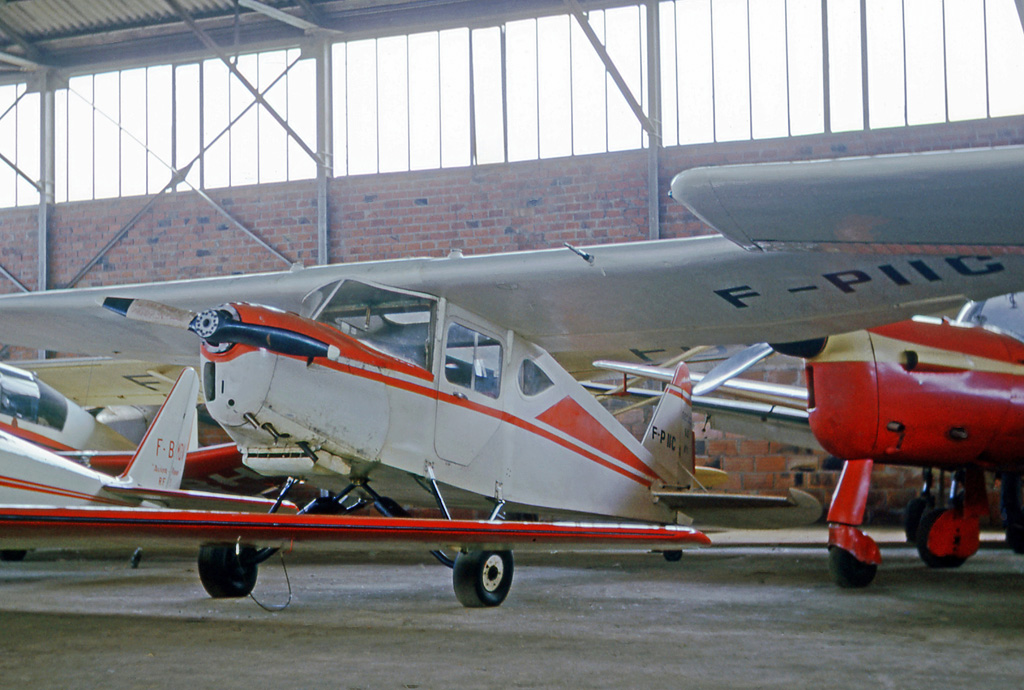
The SECAT S-5 in 1965 showing the unusual design of the split windscreen

Design work on light aircraft was resumed by SECAT in 1946, resulting in the SECAT S-5, the prototype of which was first flown in that year. The S-5 was based on the design of the S-4, and was of all-wooden construction and had side-by-side seating for two persons. The cantilever, elliptical high-set wing comprised a wooden box-spar, chordwise ribs and a stressed plywood skin. The trailing edge carried ailerons and flaps. The fuselage was a wooden semi-monocoque and dual controls were fitted. The windscreen was split. A large access door was provided on each side of the fuselage, and all fuel was carried in a 250 L (55 imp gal; 66 US gal) tank installed in the wing. After the prototype, no further examples of the type were completed.

== Operational history ==
The sole example of the SECAT S-5, registered F-PIIC, was initially operated from Toussus-le-Noble Airport, near Paris. By 1964, it was owned by M. Rene Dupuis, and it was hangared at Arras Roclincourt Airport. The aircraft was still extant in 1967; however, it was struck off the French civil aircraft register during the 1970s.

== Specifications ==
Data from The Aircraft of the World

General characteristics

- Crew: 1
- Capacity: 1 passenger or student pilot
- Length: 6.15 m (20 ft 2 in)
- Wingspan: 8.99 m (29 ft 6 in)
- Height: 2.11 m (6 ft 11 in)
- Empty weight: 350 kg (772 lb)
- Gross weight: 570 kg (1,257 lb)
- Fuel capacity: 250 L (55 imp gal; 66 US gal)
- Powerplant: 1 × Regnier 4D.2 four cylinder air cooled piston, 56 kW (75 hp)

Performance

- Maximum speed: 196 km/h (122 mph, 106 kn)
- Cruise speed: 150 km/h (93 mph, 81 kn)
- Range: 800 km (497 mi, 432 nmi)
- Service ceiling: 3,600 m (11,810 ft)
- Rate of climb: 3.0 m/s (590 ft/min)

== See also ==
Aircraft of comparable role, configuration, and era

- Piper J-3
