= Yermenonville =

- Commune
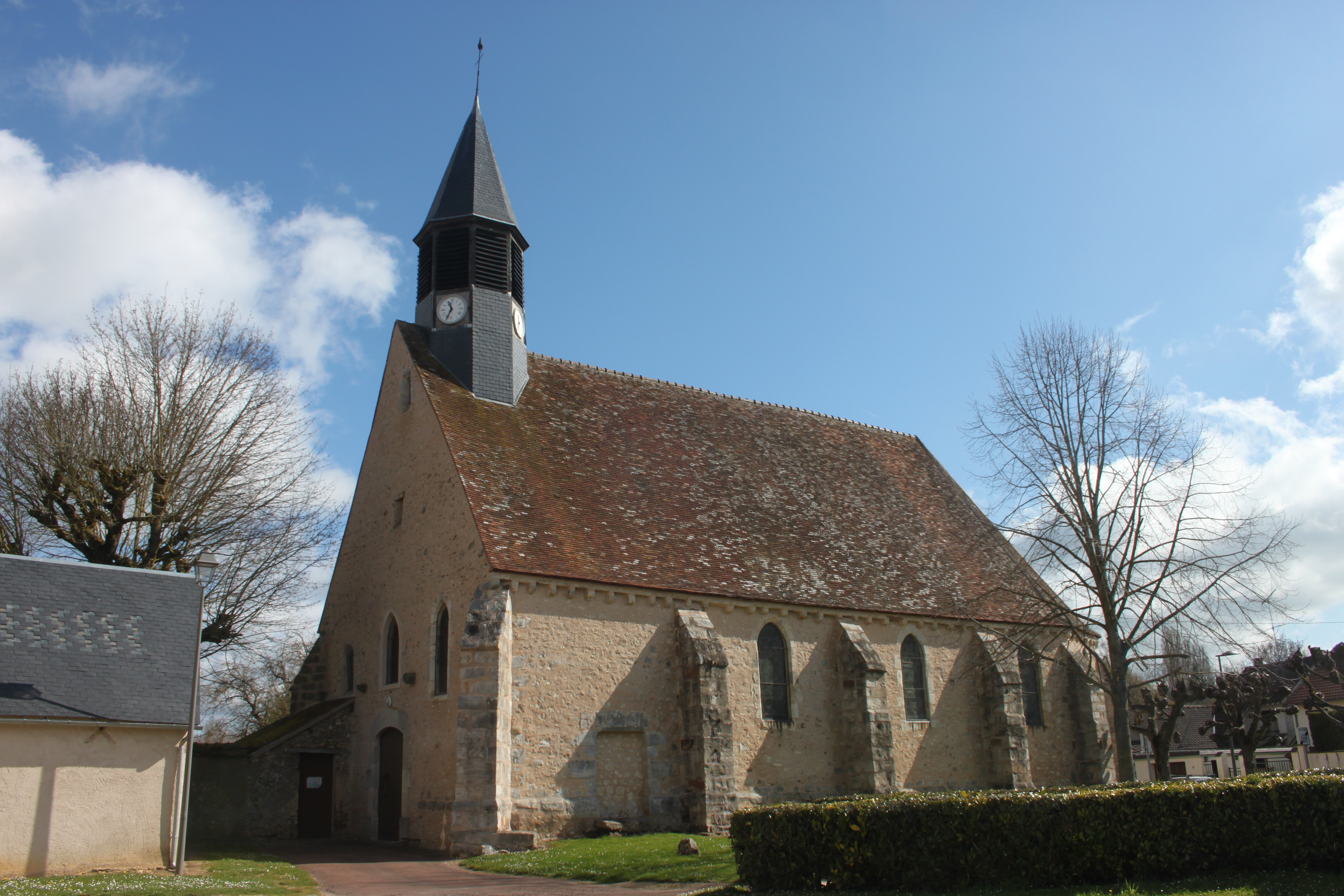
- The church in Yermenonville
- Location of Yermenonville
- Location within France Location within Centre-Val de Loire
- Coordinates: 48°33′25″N 1°37′15″E
- Country: France
- Region: Centre-Val de Loire
- Department: Eure-et-Loir
- Arrondissement: Chartres
- Canton: Auneau
- Intercommunality: Portes Euréliennes d'Île-de-France

Government
  - Mayor (2023–2026): Xavier Destouches
- Area^{1}: 5.04 km^{2} (1.95 sq mi)
- Elevation: 104 m (341 ft)
- Highest elevation: 154 m (505 ft)
- Lowest elevation: 102 m (335 ft)
- Population (2023): 621
  - Density: 123/km^{2} (319/sq mi)
- Time zone: UTC+01:00 (CET)
  - Summer (DST): UTC+02:00 (CEST)
- INSEE/Postal code: 28423 /28130
- ^{1} French Land Register data, which excludes lakes, ponds, glaciers > 1 km^{2} (0.386 sq mi or 247 acres) and river estuaries.

Yermenonville (French pronunciation: [jɛʁmənɔ̃vil]) is a commune in the Eure-et-Loir department in northern France.

== Population ==
Historical population
Year	Pop.	±% p.a.
1968	240	—
1975	262	+1.26%
1982	401	+6.27%
1990	492	+2.59%
1999	511	+0.42%
2007	606	+2.15%
2012	559	−1.60%
2017	597	+1.32%
2023	621	+0.66%
Source: INSEE

== See also ==
- Communes of the Eure-et-Loir department
