= Paulette Weber =

Belgian-French aviator and hot air balloonist

Paulette Bray-Bouquet Weber
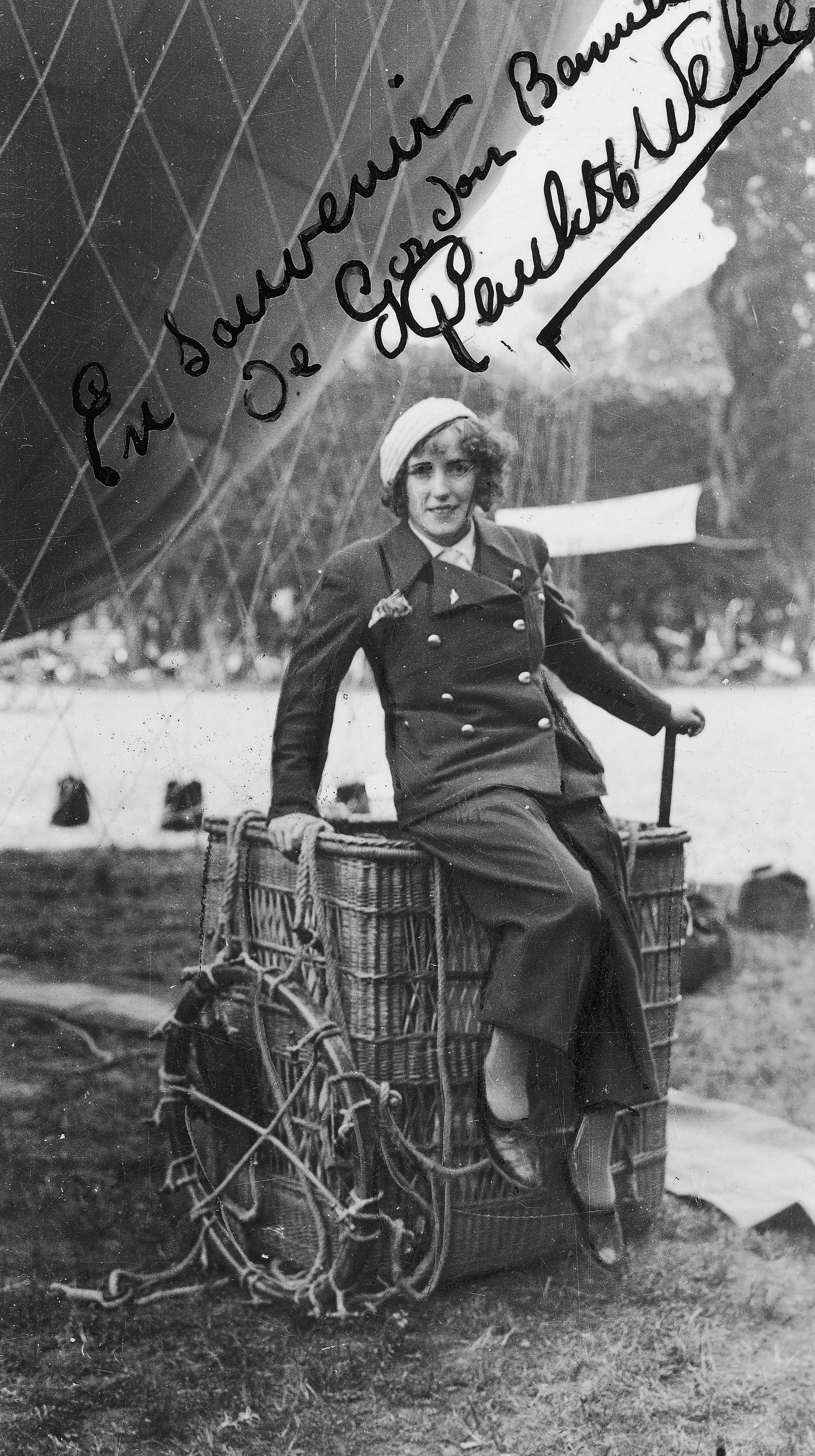
- Weber at the Gordon Bennett Cup race in Warsaw, 1934
- Born: 1901
- Died: October 1954; North Sea
- Citizenship: Belgium; France
- Occupation: Aviator

Paulette Bray-Bouquet Weber (1901 – October 1954) was a Belgian-French aviator who often piloted hot-air balloons.

== Career ==
A student of Georges Suire, Weber made her first flight in a hot-air balloon in 1928. In 1930 she gained her license as pilot, second-class, having completed 14 balloon ascents, including four solo and two at night.

On 30 December 1931 she left from Saint Cloud in the "Maison et Mallet" Trophy, competing for the distance, but because of the snow on her aircraft, weighing it down, she was forced to land in Châtillon-sur-Seine and abandon the race. She then returned to Paris by train. In 1931 she was documented in the magazine L'Aérophile, which classified her "among the pilots who 'really' carry out air travel". At that time she had made 28 ascents, including 22 solo and four at night, and had participated in the Juchmès and Mallet cups, but without victory. In 1934 she copiloted with Suire a test hot-air balloon before the Gordon Bennett Cup race in Warsaw to show the contestants how the wind blows. Two years later she came third at the Le Mans International Hot Air Balloon Cup, having travelled 250 km, and in November 1937 she won the "Aumont-Thiéville" cup with 242 km. In September 1939, she and three other pilots, Maryse Bastié, Maryse Hilsz and Claire Roman were requisitioned to ferry planes to the front for the French Air Force.

On 1 May 1946, in Paris at Place de la Concorde, demonstration flights were carried out in a balloon, with various pilots, including Paulette Weber, who was returning to pilot the balloon for the first time since 1939. On this occasion, the journalist Suzy Mathis published an article on the Weber on the central page of Aviation française, where they repurposed passages from a previous interview that Mathis had done with Weber for Les dimanches de la femme. It also summarized some of her records:

- Distance record (750 km) Bailleul—Regensburg
- Female distance record (440 km) Gennevilliers—Eifel
- Nord-Spherique Cup, with 2500 km in 4 ascents
- Planchon-Ramade Cup, 2nd place
- Alfred-Leblanc Cup, 2nd place

The interview ended with a Weber statement: "Balloon tourism is the king of tourism."

== Death ==
Paulette Weber died in October 1954, whilst making her 235th balloon ascent. The accident was caused by the progressive loss of hydrogen via a defect in the porous coating of her balloon, a common issue at the time. Despite having thrown all the ballast overboard, the balloon sank into the waters of the North Sea.

== Bibliography ==
- "L'Aérophile: technical and practical review of aerial locomotion". L'Aérophile. Vol. 46. 1938. p. 165.
- "Wings, aviation world and aviation world". Hebdomadaire. No. 1140. 6 December 1947.
- "France illustration". Vol. 5. 1949. p. 214.
- "Icare: magazine of the broken wings of Belgium". 1953.
- "La Conquéte de l'air". No. 48–49. 1953. p. 86.
