= Yvonne Jourjon =

French pilot and flight instructor

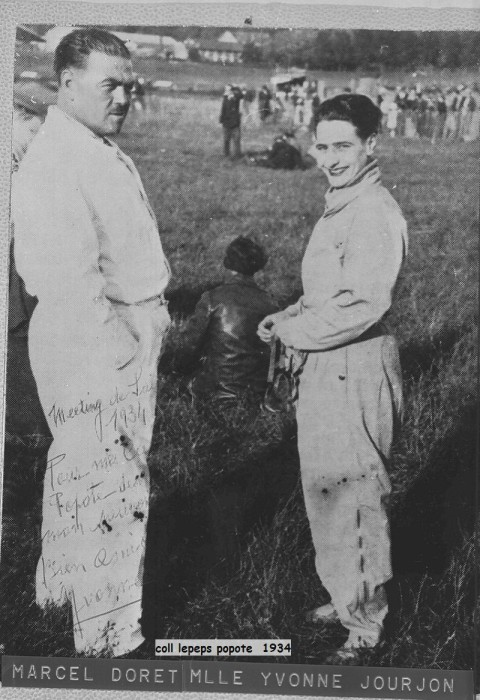
- Born: 13 September 1899; Besançon
- Died: 4 September 1985 (aged 85); Ivry-sur-Seine
- Occupation: Pilot
- Known for: First woman flight instructor in France

Yvonne Jourjon (13 September 1899 - 4 September 1985) was a pioneering French pilot and flight instructor. She was the first woman flight instructor in France.

== Early life ==
Yvonne Albine Jourjon was born in Besançon on 13 September 1889. In 1924, she obtained her parachuting licence and, in 1932, joined the Union des pilotes civils de France. The following year, she passed her aeroplane pilot's licence.

== Flying career ==
Jourjon initially learned parachuting, and received her parachuting certificate in 1924. In 1932, she joined the Union of Civil Pilots of France and in the following year earned her pilot licence.

On 24 September 1934, she flew with Madeleine Charnaux, who was attempting to break a women's altitude record flying a Miles Hawk with a 105 hp De Havilland Gipsy III engine. They succeeded, reaching 4,990 meters (16,371 feet) but the record only stood until 22 November when Marthe de Lacombe reached 5,632 metres in a Morane-Saulnier 341. In 1935, she won the Douze heures d'Angers with Marthe de Lacombe.

In 1936, she qualified as a flying instructor at the Aéro-club d'Ile-de-France.

In 1937, she beat the women's altitude record for light aircraft in a Farman Mosquito.

In 1945, she became second lieutenant in the air force on the base of Châteauroux, then on that of Kasba Tadla in Morocco.

At the end of World War II Jourjon was chosen by Charles Tillon, a French government minister, to form a corps of female military pilots in the French army.

In 1970, Jourjon was recognised by the International Aeronautical Federation for her contribution to the aviation industry.

Yvonne Jourjon died on 4 September 1985 in Ivry-sur-Seine.

== Commemoration ==
In 2010, the town of Avrillé, Vendée named a street after Jourjon.
