= Maryse Bastié =

French aviator

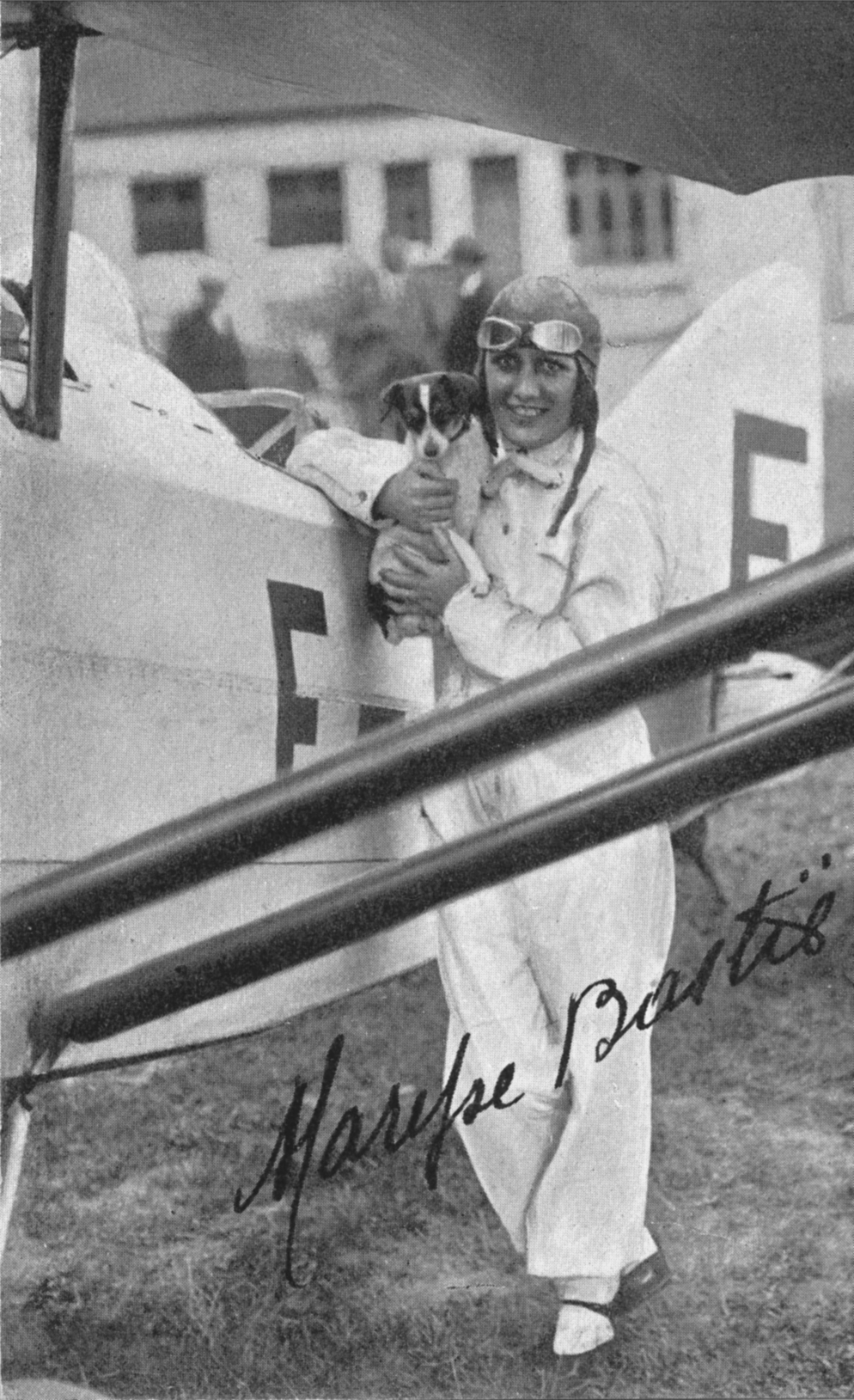
- Born: Marie-Louise Bombec; 27 February 1898; Limoges, Haute-Vienne;
- Died: 6 July 1952 (aged 54); Lyon
- Resting place: Cimetière du Montparnasse, Paris
- Occupation: Aviator
- Awards: Legion of Honour - Commander (1947)

Maryse Bastié (French pronunciation: [maʁiz bastje]; 27 February 1898 – 6 July 1952) was a French aviator who set several international records for female aviators during the 1930s.

== Early life ==
She was born Marie-Louise Bombec in Limoges, Haute-Vienne; Bastié's father died when she was eleven, and her family struggled to survive. As an adolescent she worked in a shoe factory, money was scarce and an early marriage that failed left her with a child, who died young, and limited means.

== Flying career ==
As a result of her marriage to Louis Bastié, a World War I pilot, she became fascinated by the new phenomenon of powered flight and was determined to become a pilot and to own her own plane. She obtained her license to fly and although her husband was killed in a plane crash (in 1926), Maryse Bastié began doing aerobatics to earn money to keep herself flying and in 1927 purchased her own aircraft, a Caudron C.109.

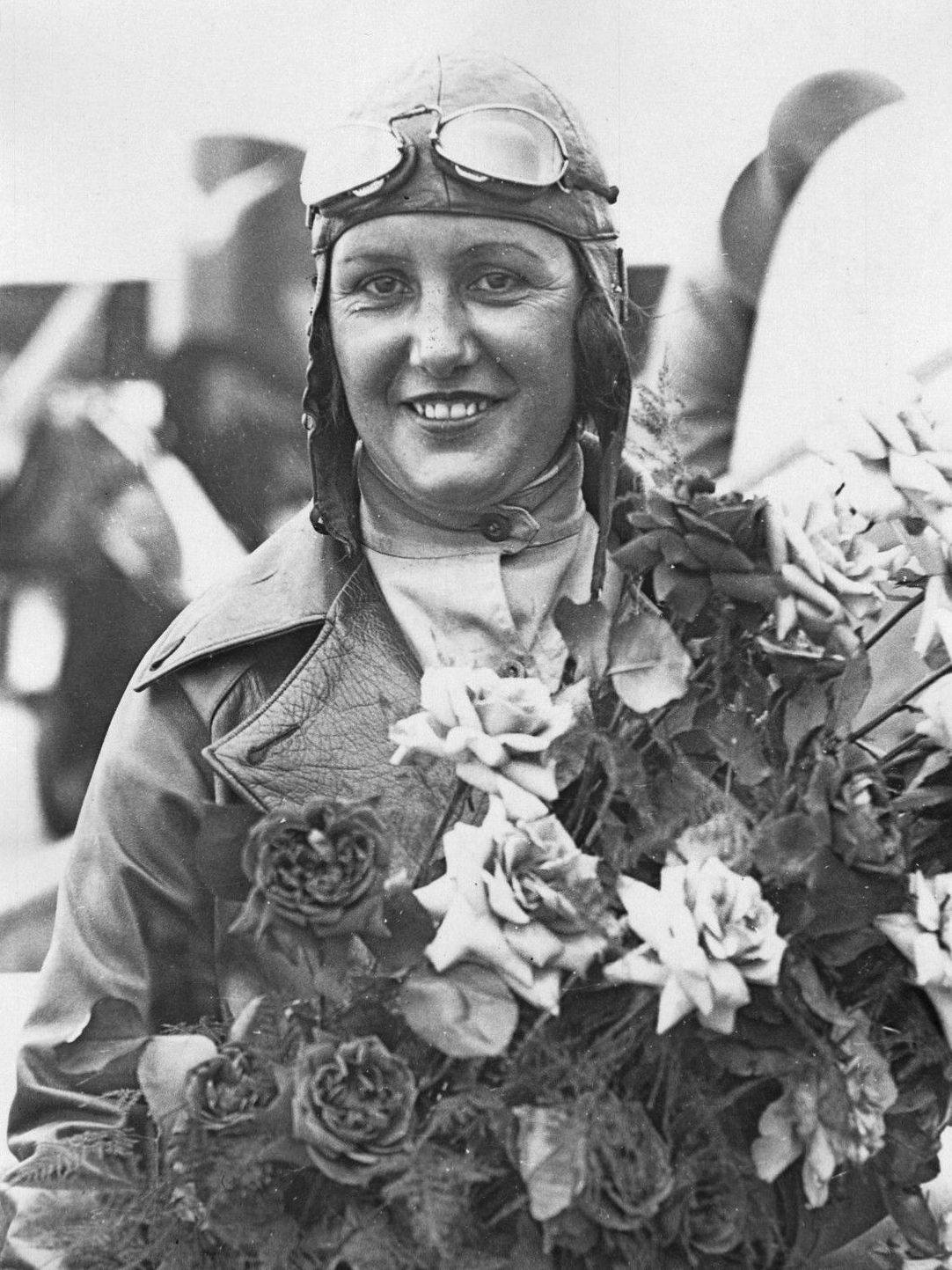
Maryse Bastié 1932b

Records set by Maryse Bastié in the 1930s included international records for women in duration flying, distance, and a record time for a solo flight across the South Atlantic. Her performances earned her the Harmon Trophy in 1931. In 1935 she founded her own flying school at Orly Airport.

Bastié served in the French Air Force, rising to the rank of Captain while logging more than 3,000 hours' flying time. In 1937, she published her story under the title Ailes ouvertes: carnet d'une aviatrice. In September 1939, she and three other pilots, Maryse Hilsz, Claire Roman and Paulette Bray-Bouquet were requisitioned to ferry planes to the front for the Air Force.

== Awards ==
In 1931, Bastié was awarded a Knight in France's Legion of Honour for her flight on 28 June 1931, a 2976 km journey from Le Bourget to Yurino (Russia) undertaken in 30 hours 30 minutes at an average speed of 97 km/h. In 1936, this was upgraded to the rank of officer for Bastié's flight aboard her Caudron 635 Simoun F-Anxo (30 December 1936), which broke the record for crossing the South Atlantic in 12 hours 5 minutes. In 1947, her rank was upgraded to that of commander, for her "exceptional war titles and acts of resistance".

== Death and burial ==
On 6 July 1952, following a conference in Lyon, Maryse Bastié was killed when her plane crashed during takeoff. She is buried in the Cimetière du Montparnasse in Paris.

== Posthumous honors ==
The "Lycée professionnel régional Maryse Bastié" in Hayange-Marspich, the "Lycée Maryse Bastié" in Limoges, and the "College Maryse Bastié" in Reims as well as in Vélizy-Villacoublay and Ingrandes-Le Fresne sur Loire are named in her memory. The Real Estate Services division of aircraft maker Bombardier Inc. named a street in her honor in Saint-Laurent, Quebec as did the French cities of Anglet, Bron, Haguenau, Châteaulin and Lyon.

In 1955, the Government of France honored Maryse Bastié with her image on an airmail postage stamp.

There is a memorial to Maryse Bastile in the west of Paris in a small park of the Boulevard du Garigliano M. Valin not far from the Seine.

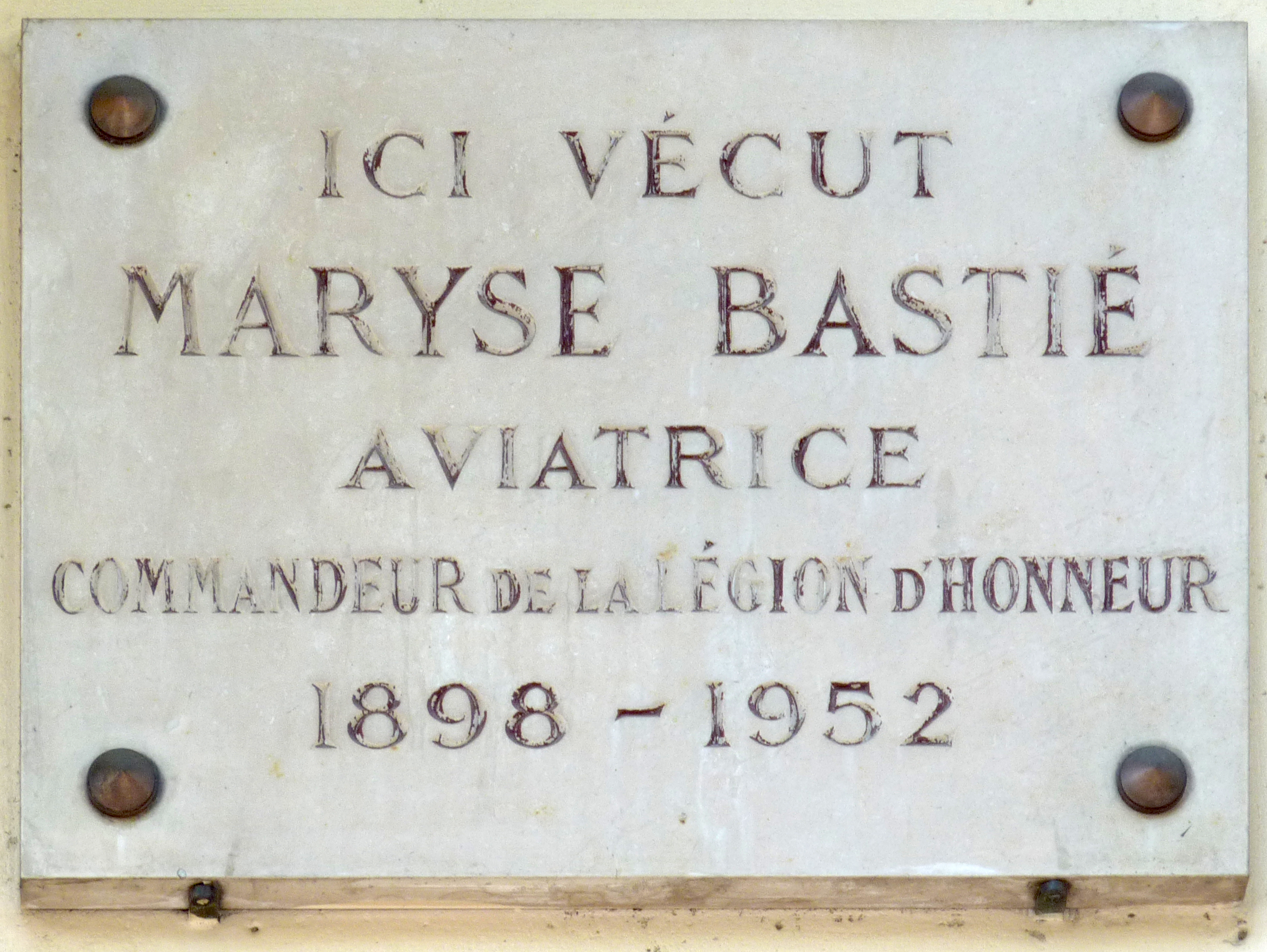
Paris Maryse Bastié122

A plaque commemorates her on the wall of her former home at 23 rue Froidevaux, Paris 14^{e}.

In 2025, French historic aircraft specialist Antoine Ros built and flew a replica of Maryse Bastié Caudron C.109 F-AHFE, which was used in 1929 by Maryse Bastié to set her duration record.

== See also ==
- Legion of Honour
- Legion of Honour Museum
- List of Legion of Honour recipients by name (B)
- Ribbons of the French military and civil awards
