= Hélène Boucher =

French pilot (1908–1934)

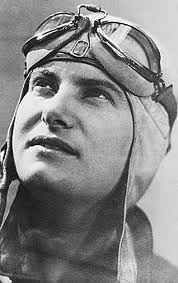
- Boucher in 1934
- Born: 23 May 1908; Paris, France
- Died: 30 November 1934 (aged 26); Guyancourt, France
- Cause of death: aircraft accident
- Resting place: Yermenonville cemetery

Hélène Boucher (French pronunciation: [elɛn buʃe]; 23 May 1908 — 30 November 1934) was a well-known French pilot in the early 1930s, when she set several women's world speed records and the all-comers record for 1,000 km (621 mi) in 1934. She was killed in an accident in the same year.

== Early life and education ==
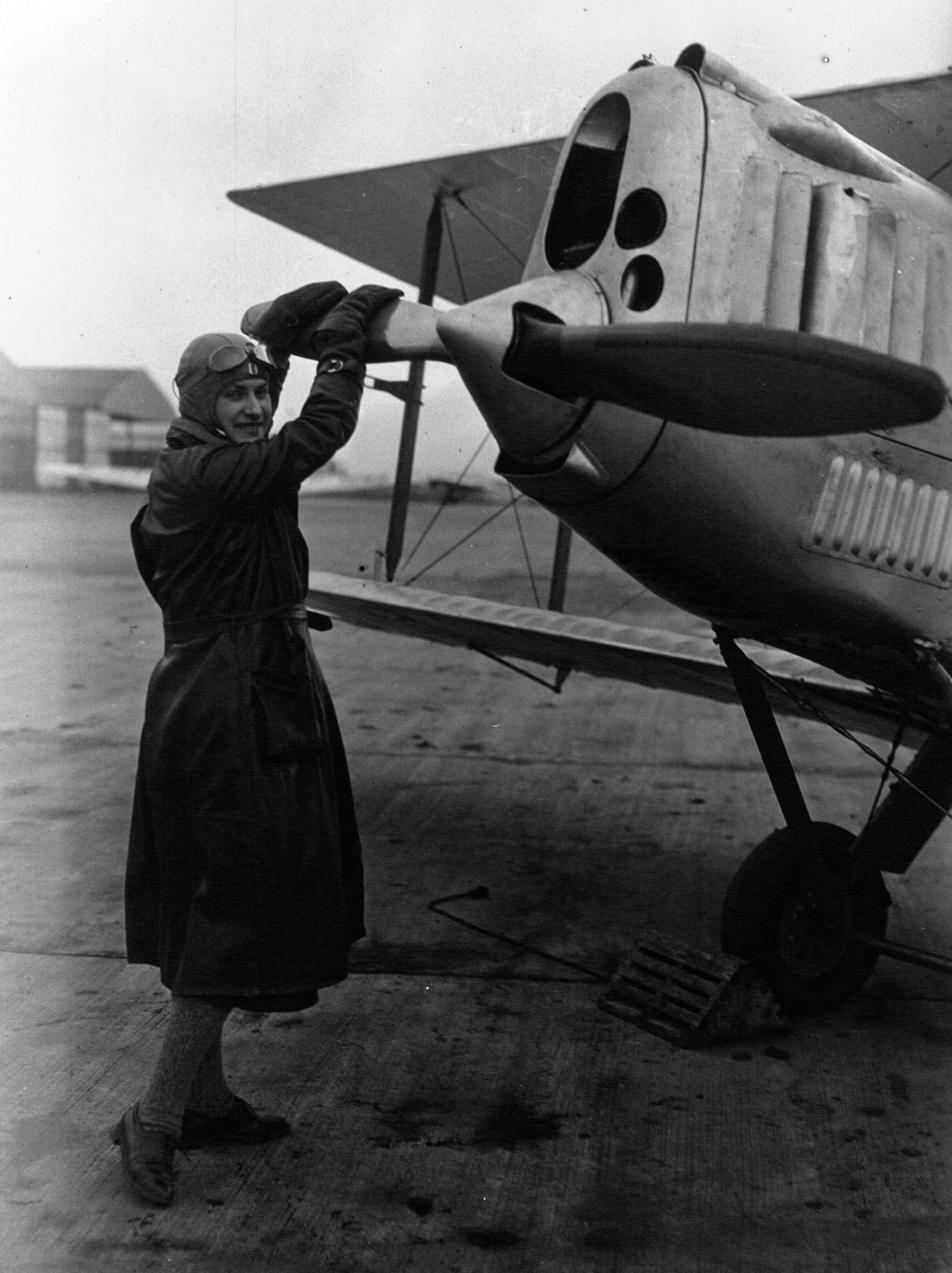
Boucher with her Cirrus-powered Avro Avian

Hélène Boucher was the daughter of a Parisian architect; after an ordinary schooling she experienced flight at Orly and then became the first pupil at the flying school run by Henri Fabos at Mont-de-Marsan. She rapidly obtained her brevet (no. 182) aged 23, bought a de Havilland Gypsy Moth and learned to navigate and perform aerobatics. In 1928 she designed the first flight jumpsuit with pockets for emergency tools.

== Flying career ==
Her great ability was recognised by Michel Detroyat who advised her to focus on aerobatics, his own speciality. Their performances drew in crowds to flight shows, for example at Villacoublay. and her skills gained her public transport brevet in June 1932. After attending a few aviation meetings, she sold the Moth and bought an Avro Avian, planning a flight to the Far East; in the event she got as far as Damascus and returned via North Africa, limited by financial difficulties.

In 1933, she flew with Edmée Jacob as a passenger in the Angers 12-hour race in one of the lowest-powered machines there, a 45 kW (60 hp) Salmson-engined Mauboussin-Zodiac 17; completing 1,645 km (1,022 mi) at an average speed of 137 km/h (85 mph) and came 14th. They were the only female team competing and received the prize of 3,000 francs set aside for an all-women team as well as 3,000 francs for position. The following year, on a contract with the Caudron company and in a faster Caudron Rafale she competed again, coming second.

During 1933 and 1934, she set several world records for women, set out below; exceptionally, she held the international (male or female) record for speed over 1,000 km (621 mi) in 1934. Most of these records were flown in Renault-powered Caudron aircraft, and in June 1934 the Renault company also took her temporarily under contract in order to promote their new Viva Grand Sport.

On 30 November 1934, she died aged 26 flying a Caudron C.430 Rafale near Versailles when the machine crashed into the woods of Guyancourt. Posthumously, she was immediately made a knight of the Légion d'honneur and was the first woman to lie in state at Les Invalides, where her obsequies were held. She is buried in Yermenonville cemetery.

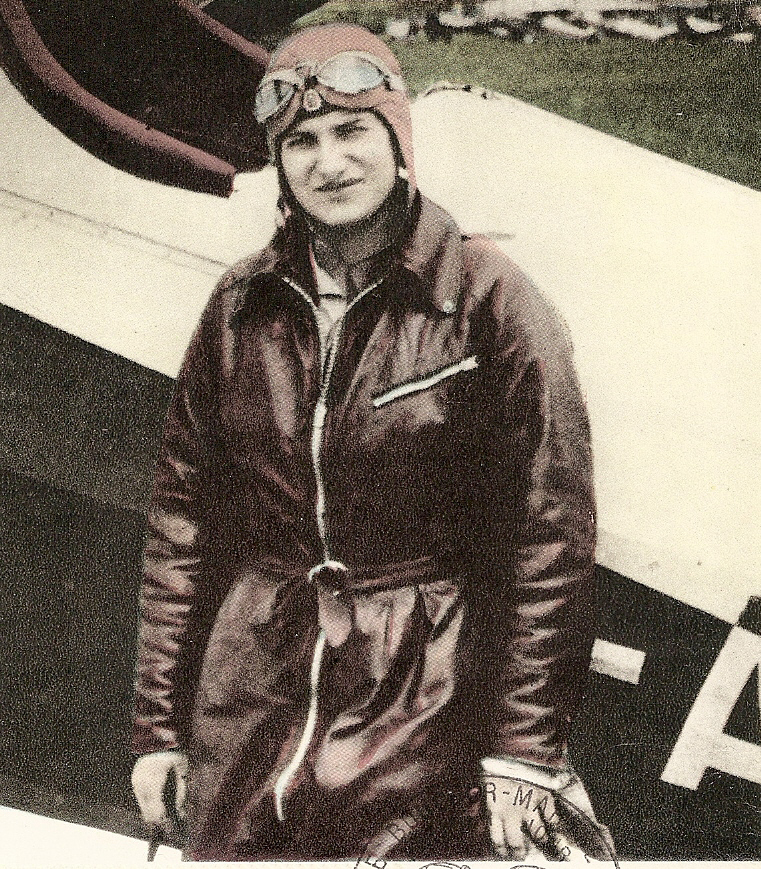
Hélène Boucher as a pilot

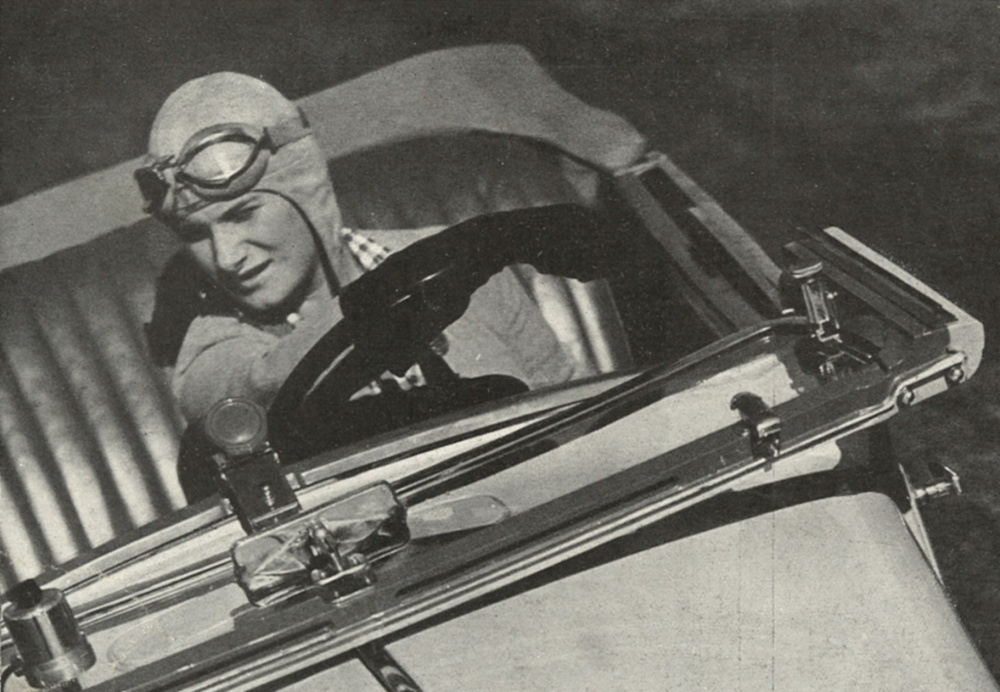
... and driver

== World records ==
On 2 August 1933, in a Mauboussin-Peyret Zodiac, she achieved a woman's altitude record of 5,900 m (19,357 ft).

On 8 July 1934 she set the "Light aircraft (Category 1)", speed record for distances over 1,000 km (621 mi) with a speed of 250.086 km/h (155.396 mph), flying the Caudron C.530 Rafale registered F-ANAO.

In 1934, in a Caudron C.450 she set two more records.

International speed over 1,000 km (621 mi) of 409.184 km/h (254.255 mph) on 8 August 1934 (also the Women's record over this distance) and on the same day speed over 100 km (62 mi) of 412.371 km/h (256.235 mph).

On 11 August 1934, she set a woman's speed record of 445.028 km/h (276.528 mph).

== Legacy ==
After her death several memorials of different kinds were set up. The first running of a competition for female pilots, the Boucher Cup, took place in 1935.

A brand new, art-deco styled, Girls High School (Lycée Hélène Boucher) built in 1935 in Paris (75 cours de Vincennes) was named after her as she was considered a model for future generations of "modernistic", forward-thinking girls. École Hélène Boucher in Mantes-la-Jolie is named after her.

There is a stone in the Guyancourt woods where the crash happened, a tomb monument at Yermenonville, and various squares and street names remember her.

== Literature ==
- Antoine Rédier: Hélène Boucher, jeune fille de France, Flammarion in 1935 with a preface by Victor Denain.
