= Acroterion =

Architectural ornament of a classical building

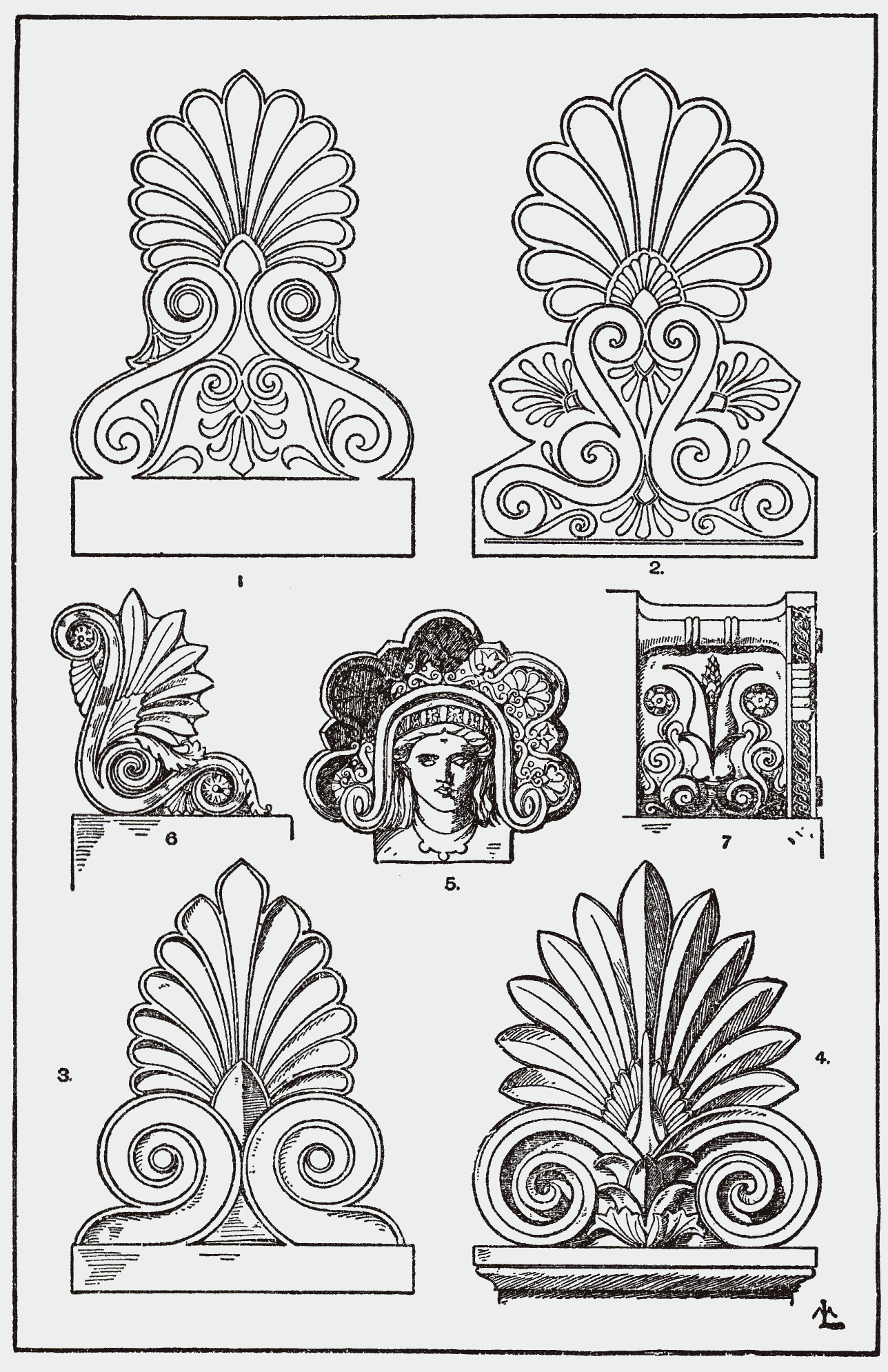
Examples of acroteria

An acroterion or acroterium (pl. akroteria) is an architectural ornament placed on a flat pedestal, the acroter or plinth, and mounted at the apex or corner of the pediment of a building in the classical style. An acroterion placed at the outer angles of the pediment is an acroterion angularium (angulārium means ‘at the corners’).

The acroterion may take a wide variety of forms, such as a statue, tripod, disc, urn, palmette or some other sculpted feature. Acroteria are also found in Gothic architecture. They are sometimes incorporated into furniture designs.

== Etymology ==
The word comes from the Greek akrōtḗrion (ἀκρωτήριον 'summit, extremity'), from the comparative form of the adjective ἄκρος, ("extreme", "endmost") + -τερος (comparative suffix) + -ιον (substantivizing neuter form of adjectival suffix -ιος). It was Latinized by the Romans as acroterium. Akroteria or Acroteria is the plural of both the original Greek and the Latin form.

According to Webb, during the Hellenistic period the winged victory or Nike figure was considered to be "the most appropriate motif for figured akroteria.”

== Gallery ==
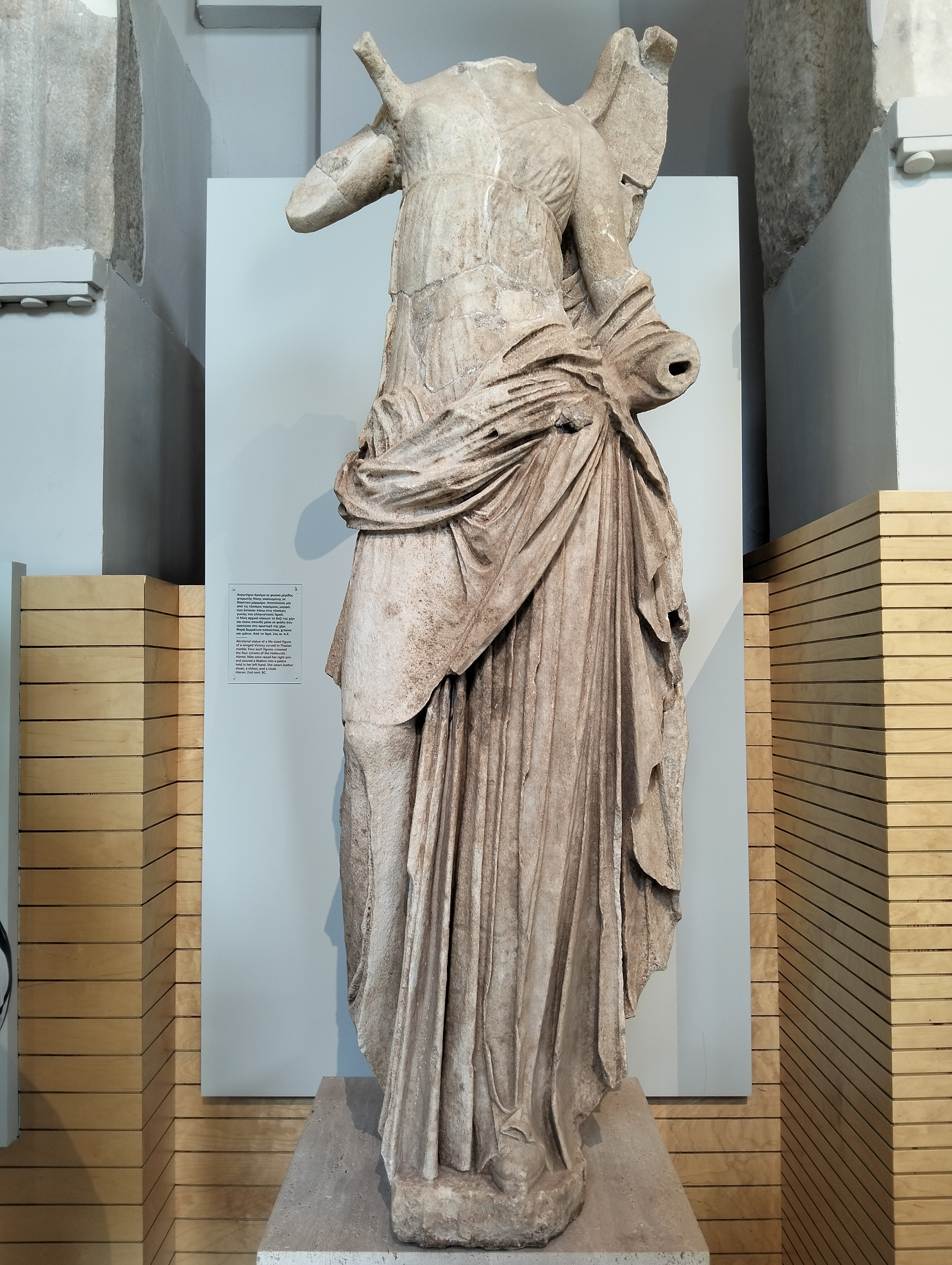
Ancient Greek marble acroterion in the form of Nike, Archaeological Museum of Samothrace, Samothrace, Greece

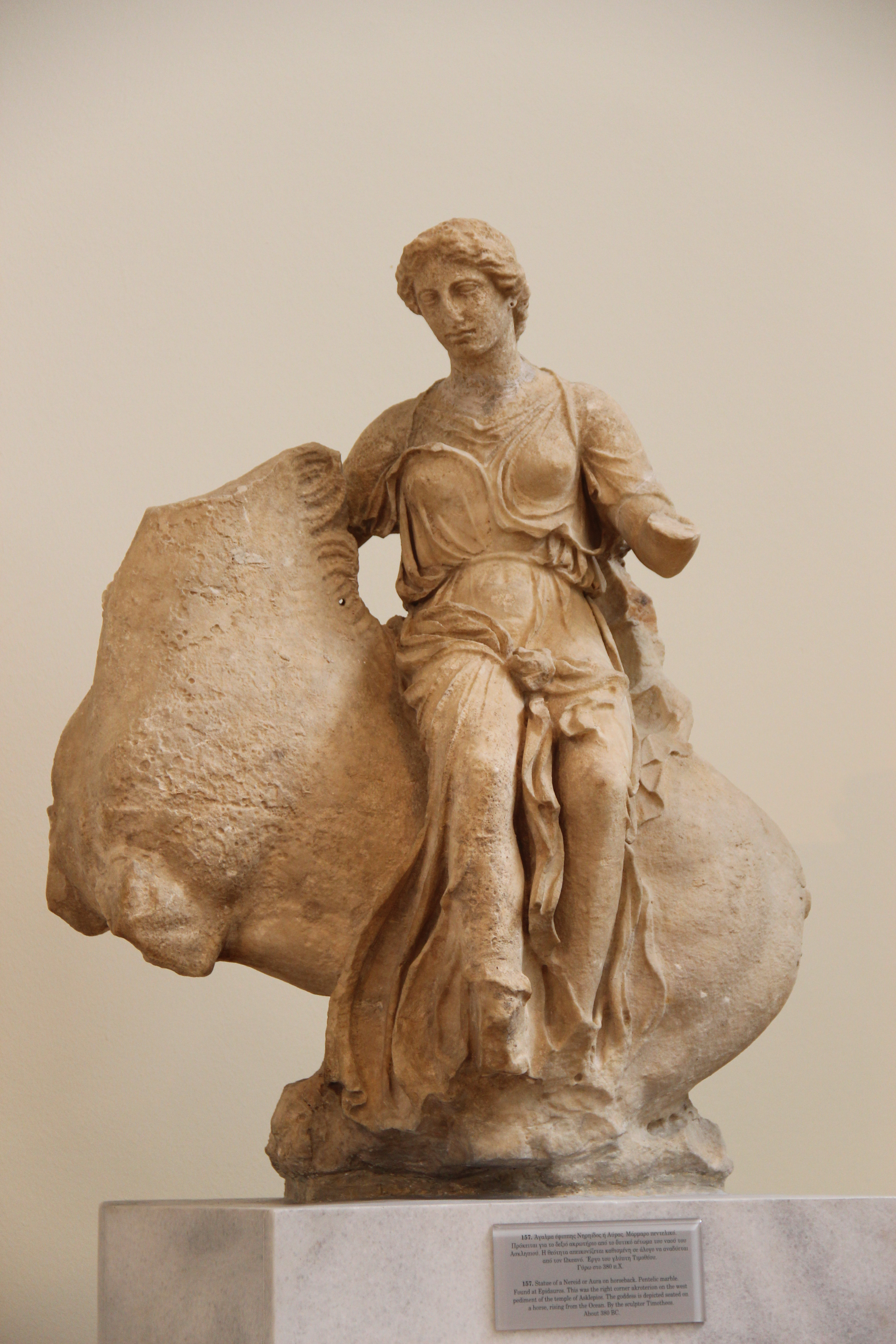
Ancient Greek acroterion of a Nereid on horseback, c.380 BC, marble, National Archaeological Museum, Athens

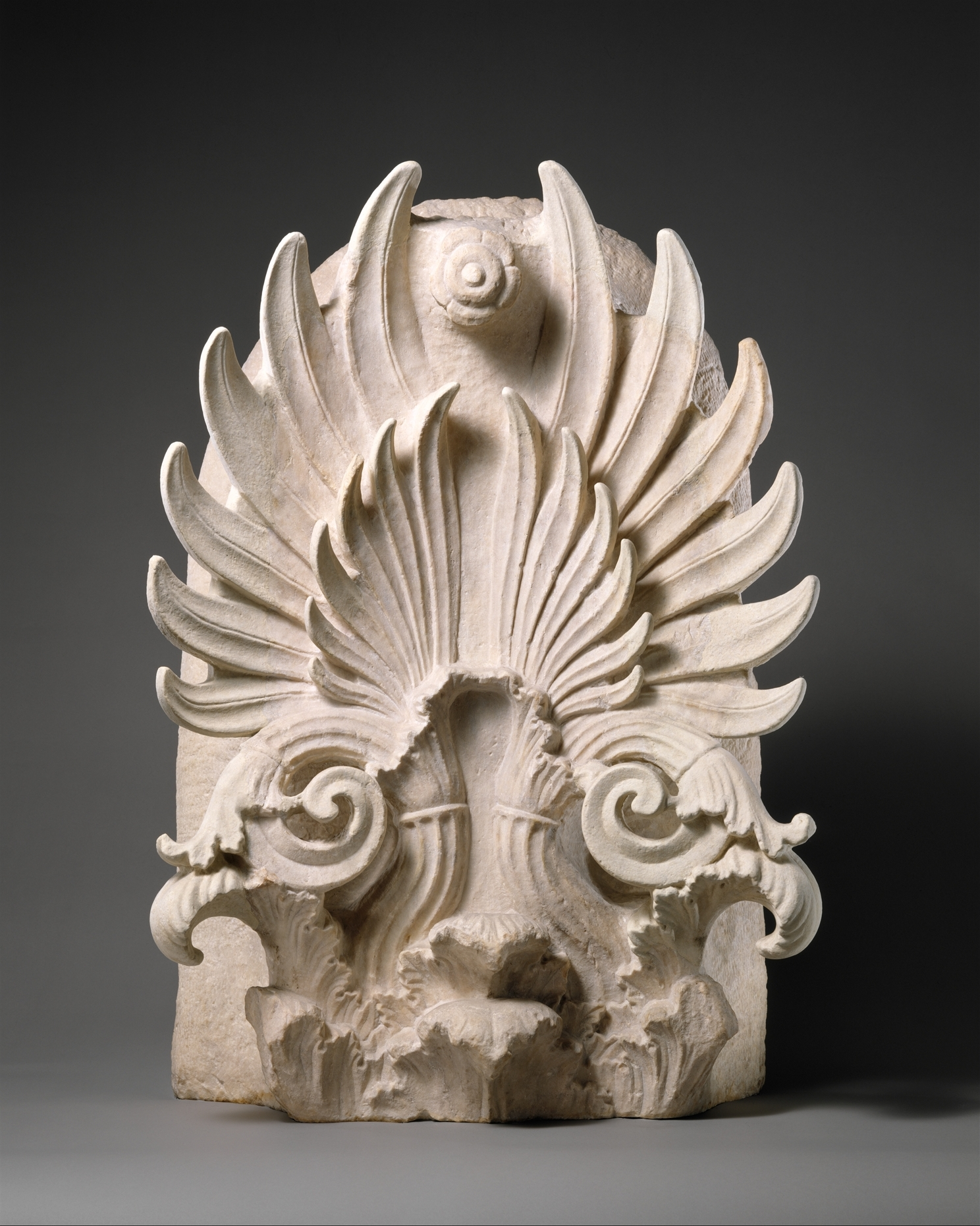
Ancient Greek akroterion, 350–325 BC, marble, Metropolitan Museum of Art, New York

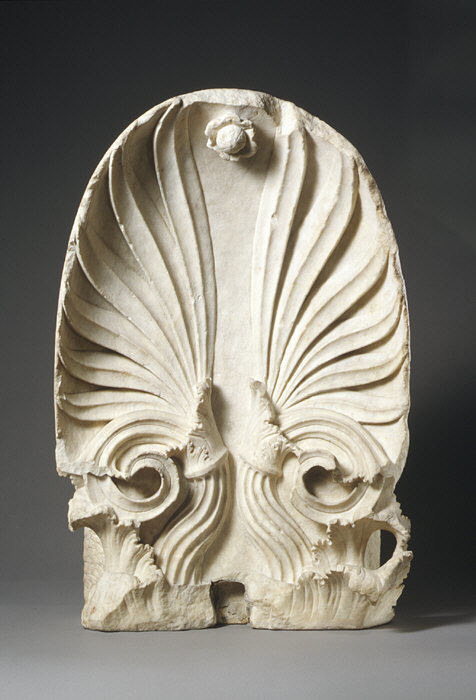
Akroterion of the grave monument of Timotheos and Nikon, 350–325 BC, marble, Metropolitan Museum of Art

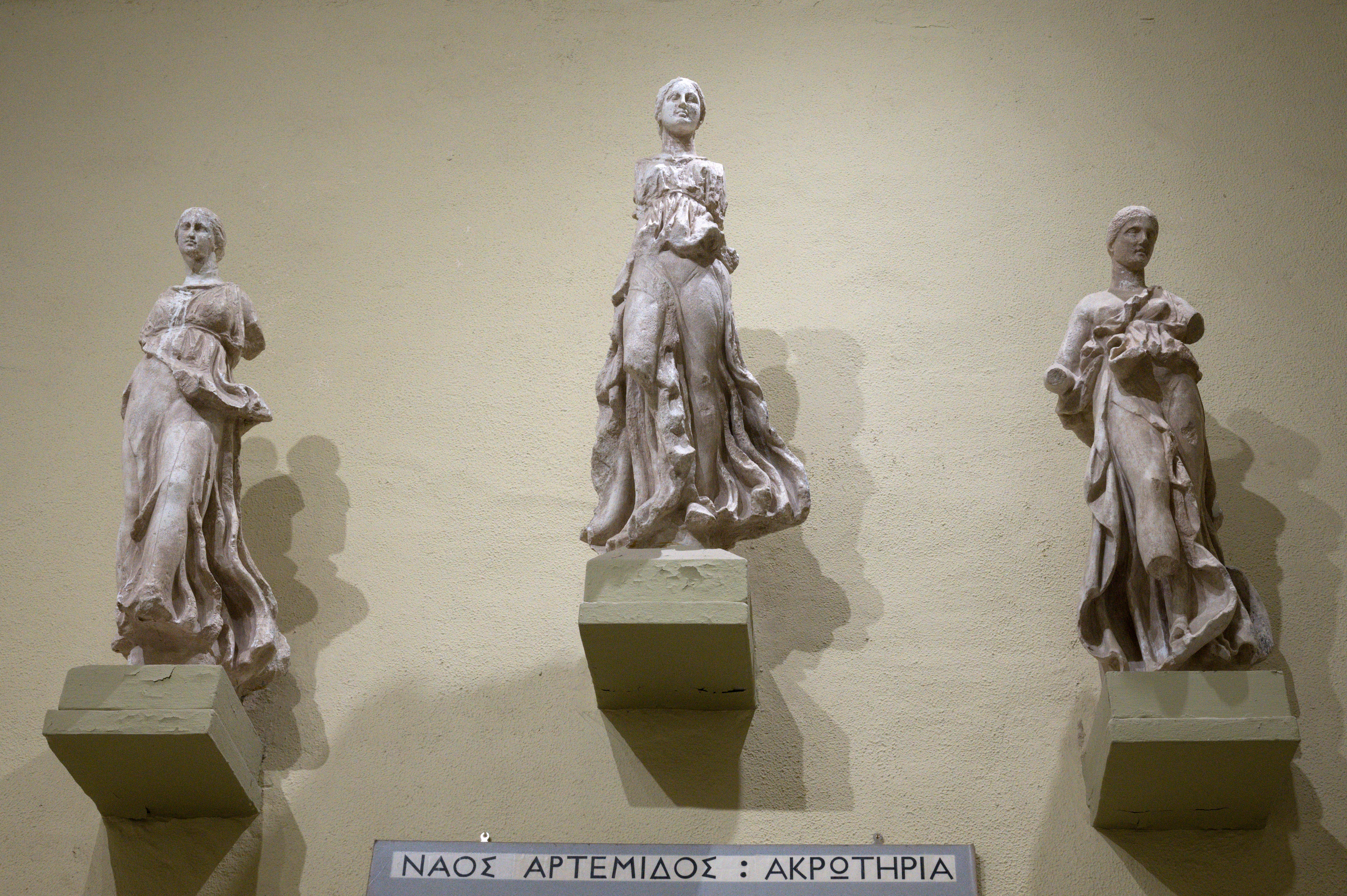
Ancient Greek acroteria from a temple of Artemis, 330-300 BC, marble, Archaeological Museum of Epidaurus, Epidaurus, Greece,

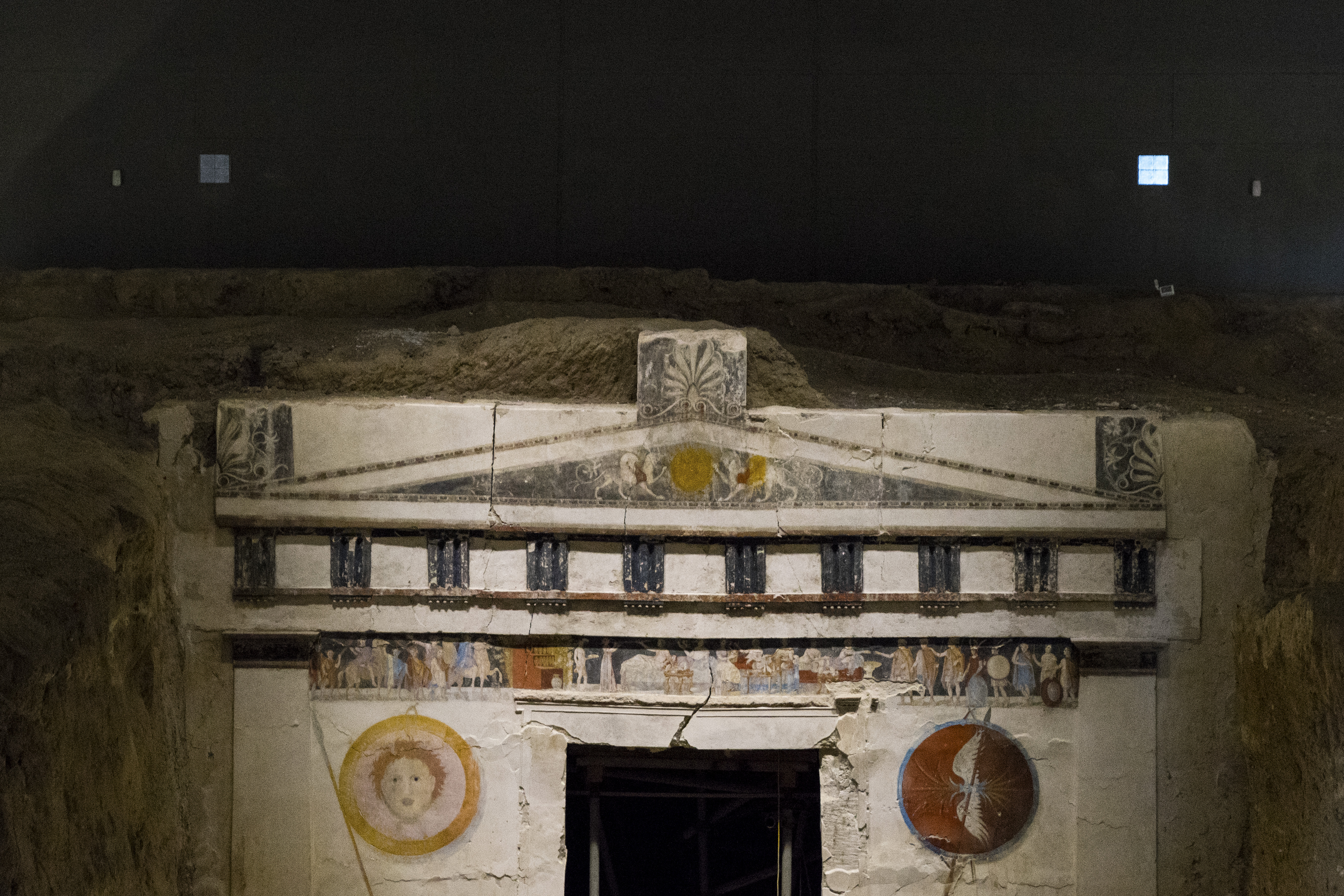
Ancient Greek acroteria of the Tomb III, Agios Athanasios, Greece, 325-300 BC

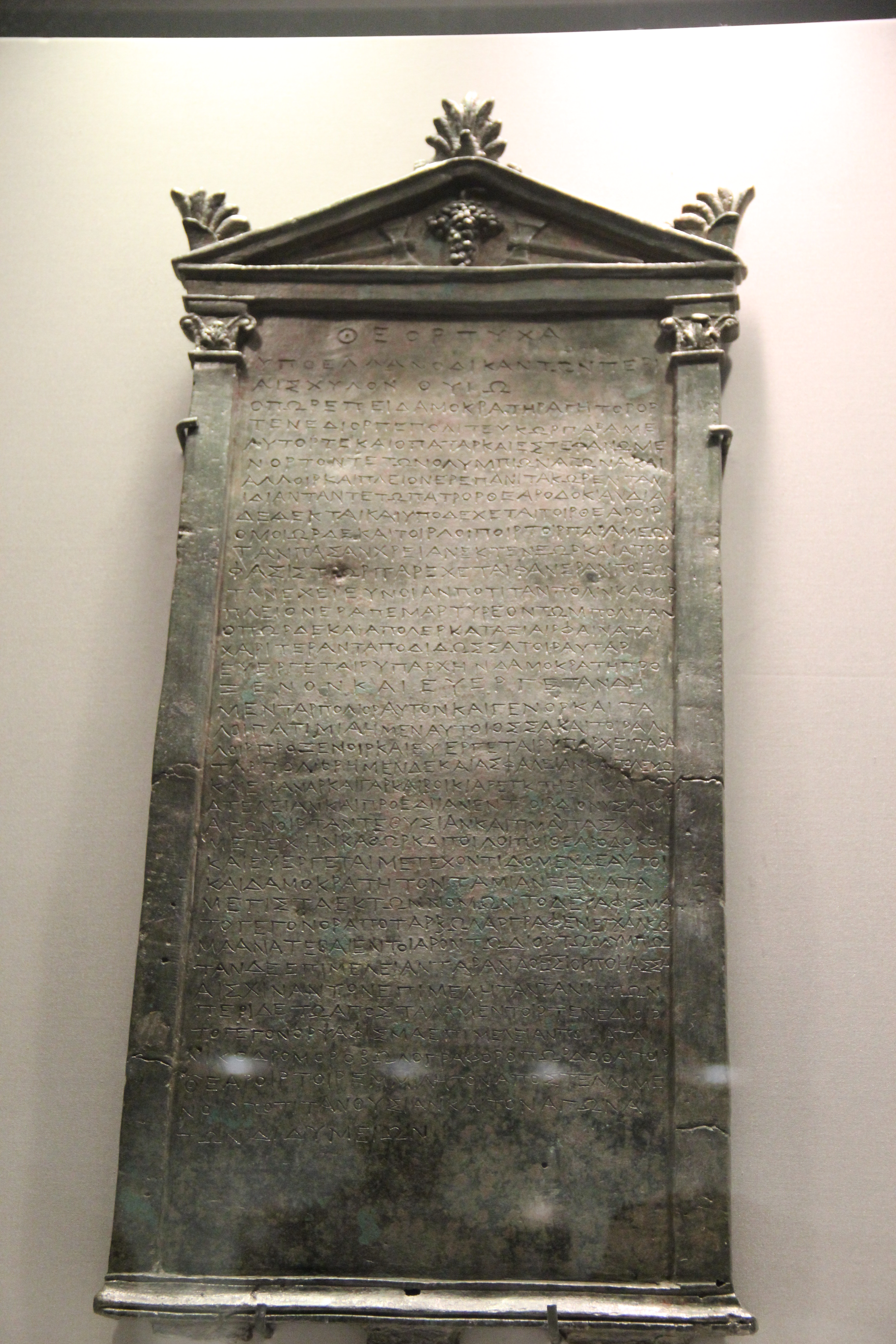
Simplified Ancient Greek acroteria of the pediment on an honorary decree, c.300-250 BC, bronze, National Archaeological Museum, Athens

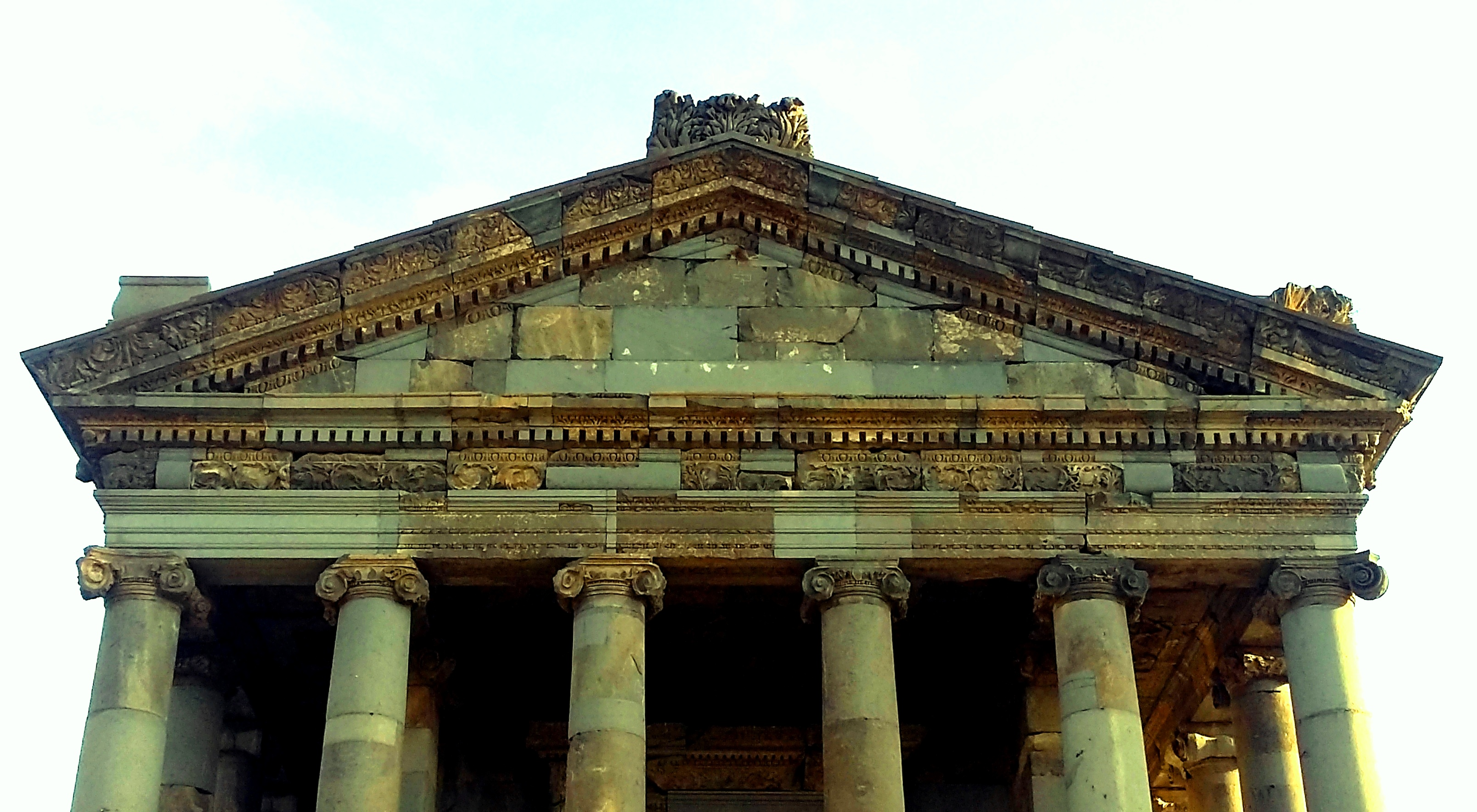
Roman acroteria of the Garni Temple, Garni, Armenia, 1st century BC

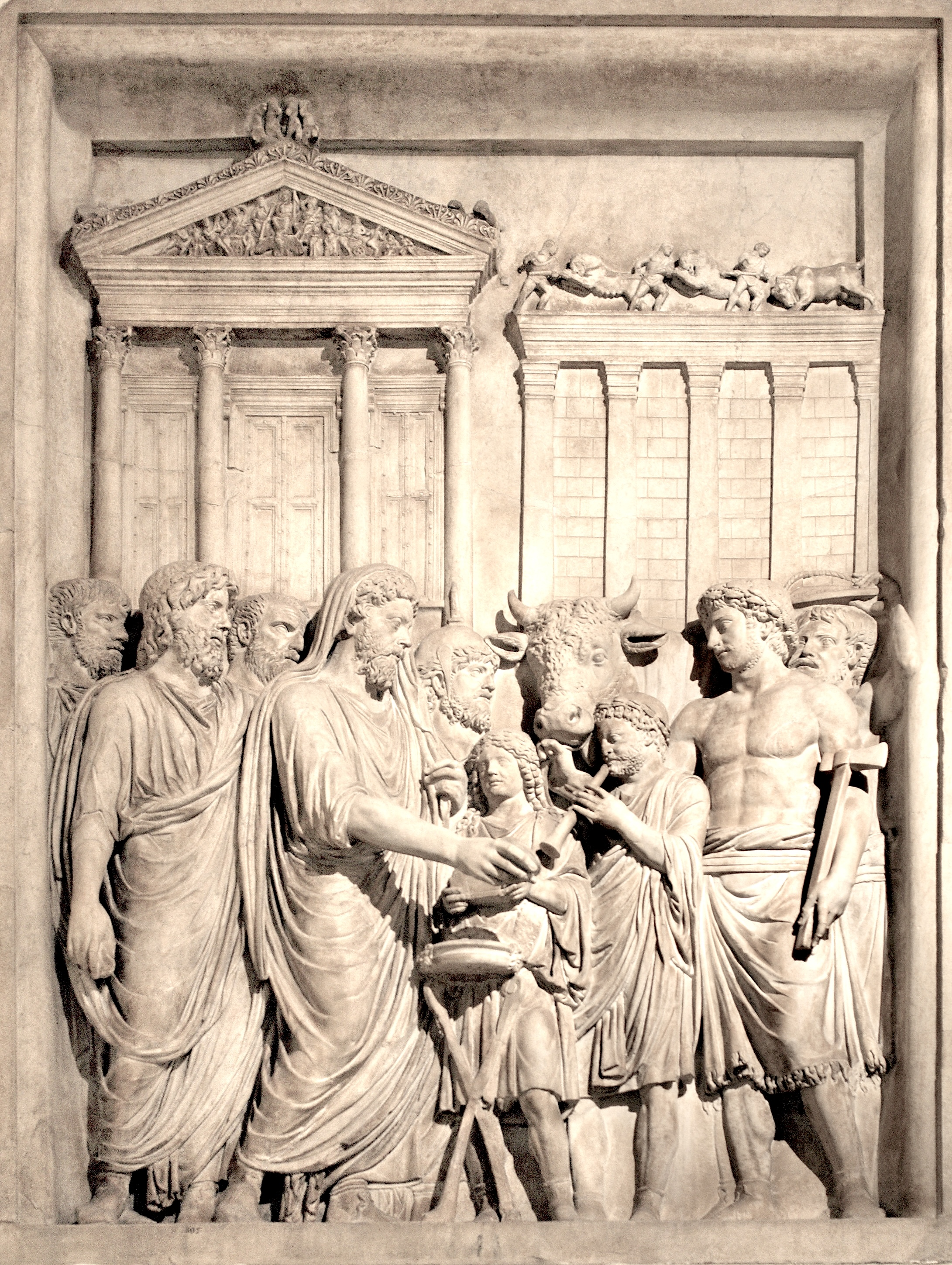
Roman acroteria atop the temple, depicted on a bas relief from the Arch of Marcus Aurelius, unknown architect, late 2nd century, Capitoline Museums Rome, Italy

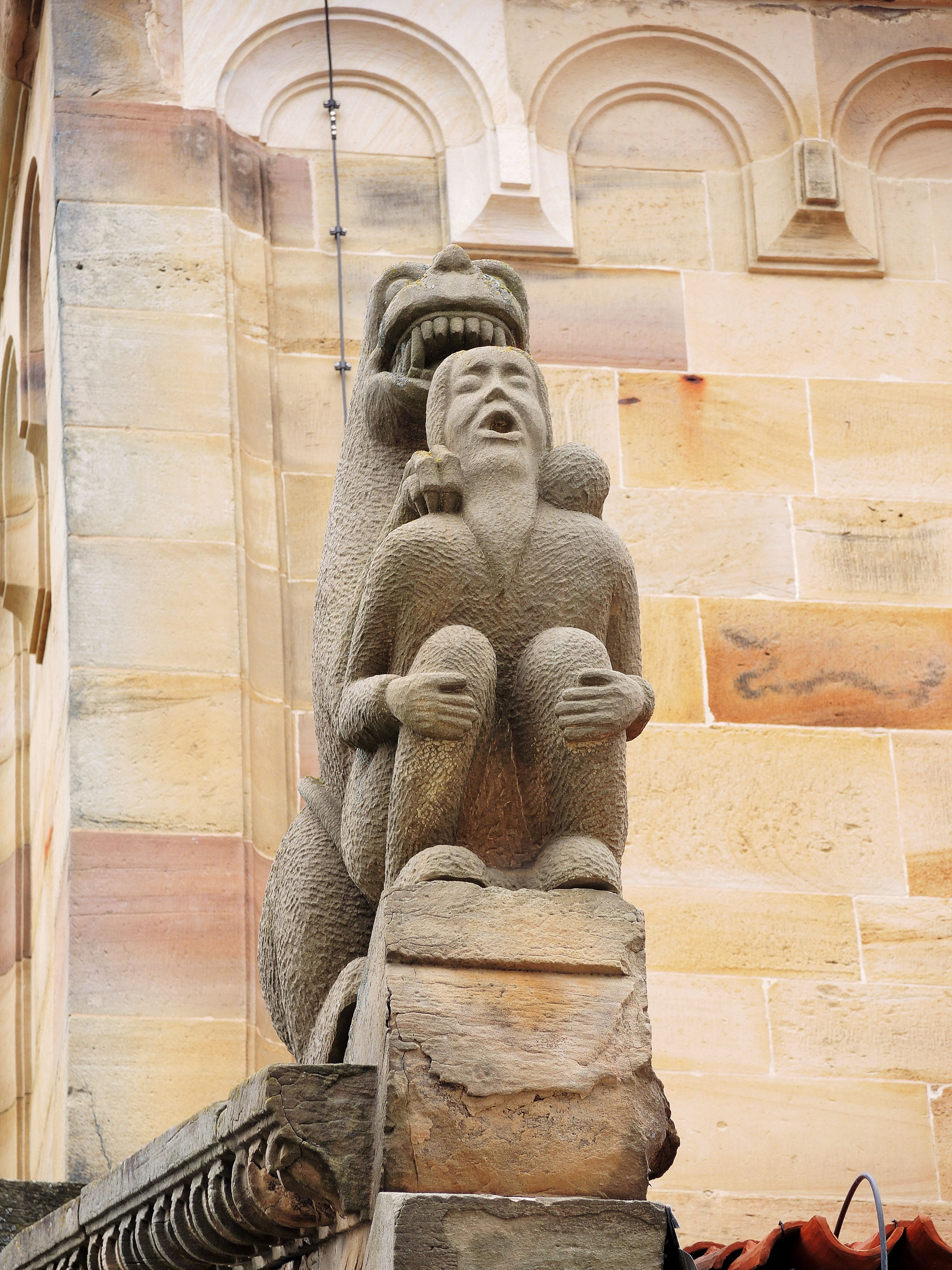
Romanesque acroterion of the Église Saints-Pierre-et-Paul de Rosheim, Rosheim, France, unknown sculptor or architect, c.1150

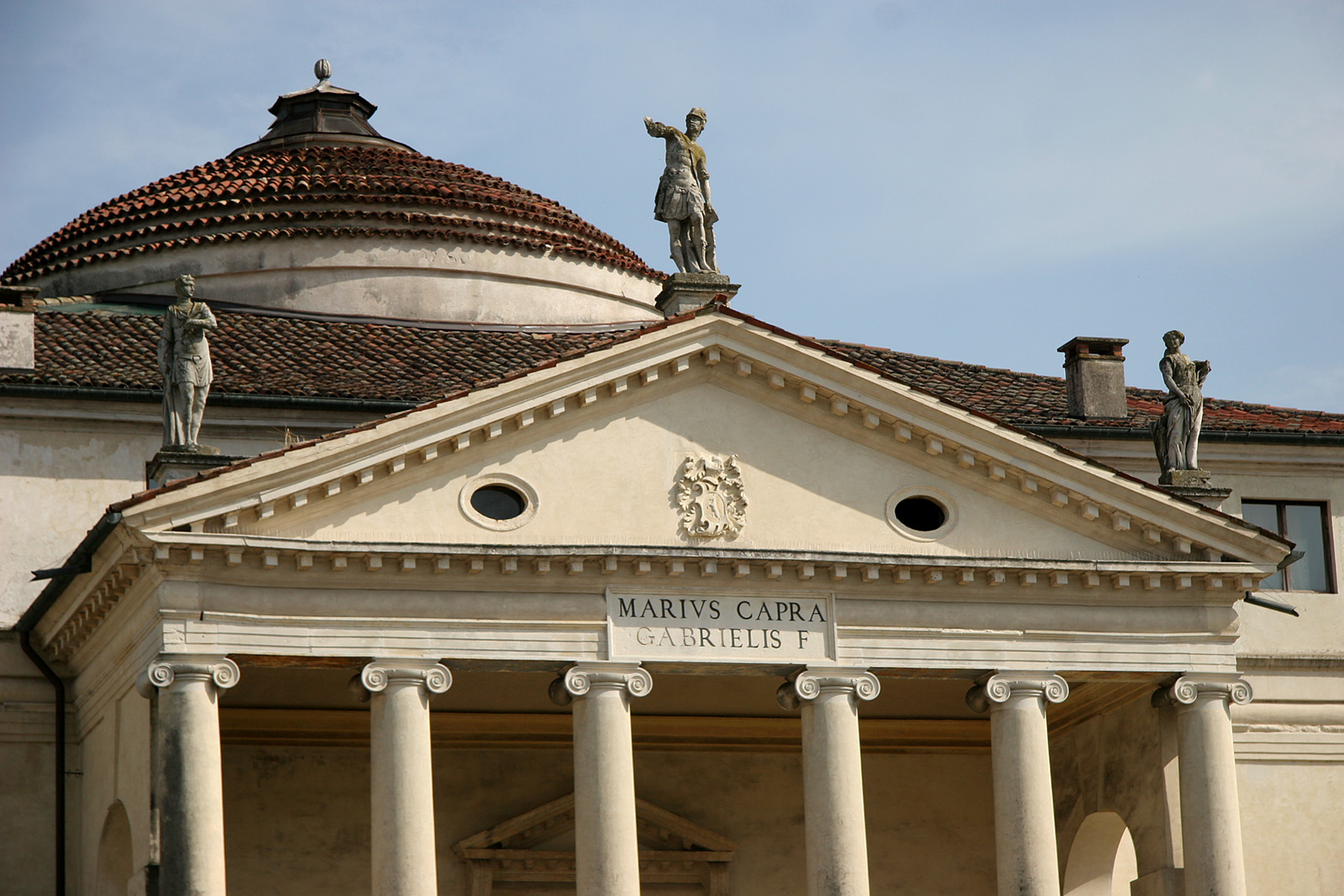
Renaissance acroteria of the Villa La Rotonda, outside Vicenza, Italy, designed by Andrea Palladio, 1566-1590s

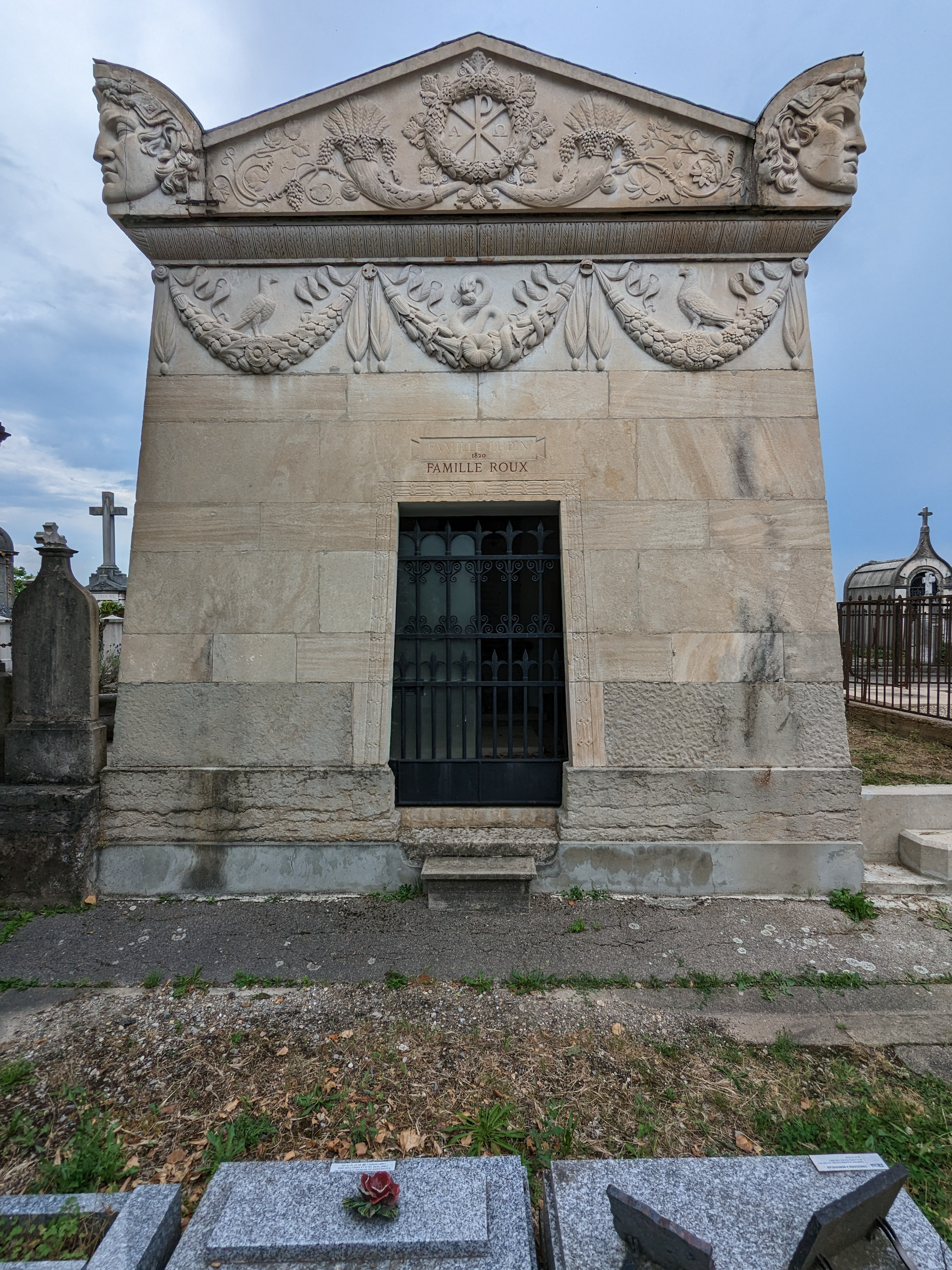
Neoclassical acroteria with mascarons on the Grave of Lupin-Roux family, Loyasse Cemetery, Lyon, sculpted by Pierre-Marie Prost, c.1830

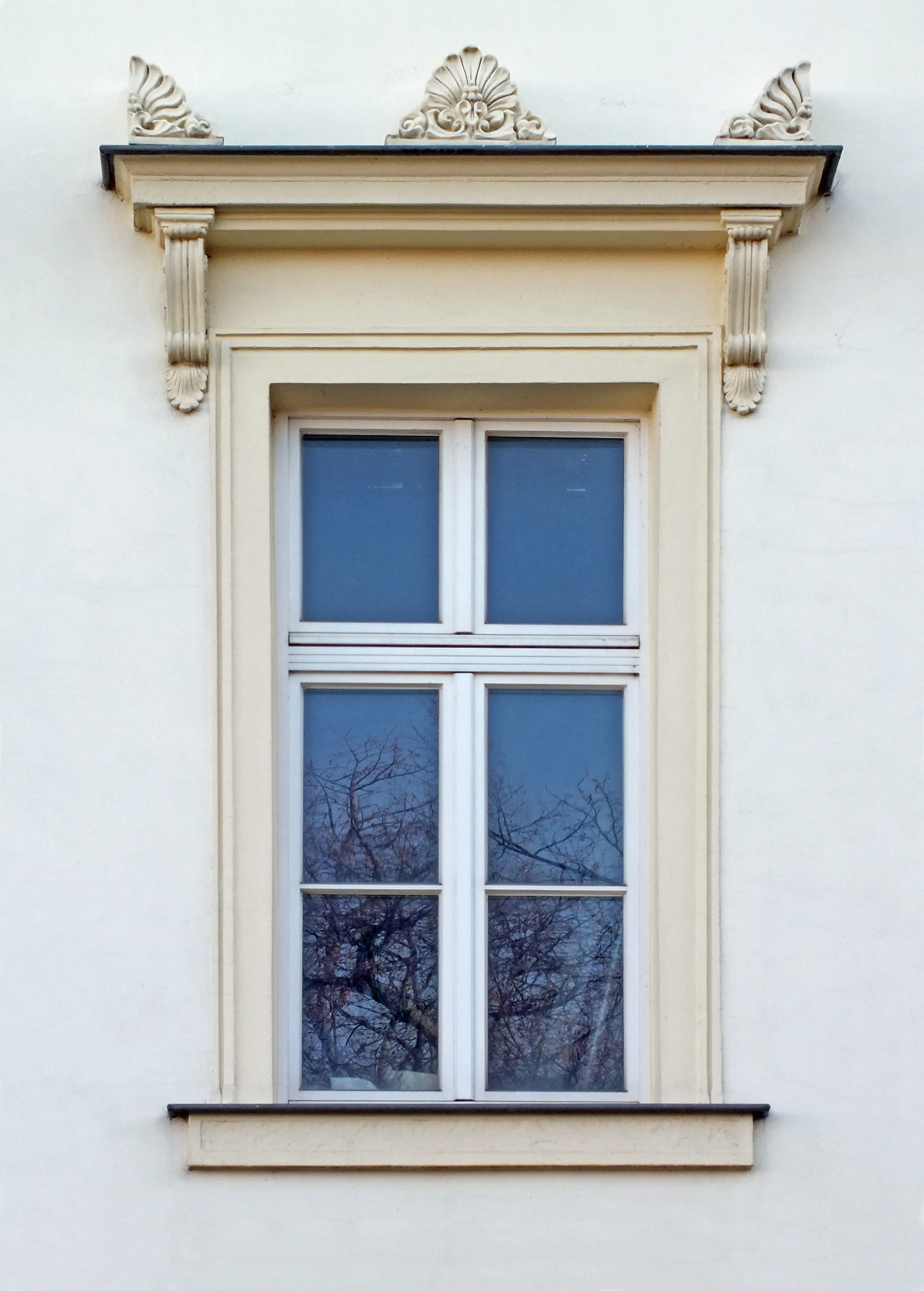
Neoclassical acroteria of a window of the Großer Blumenberg, Leipzig, Germany, designed by Albert Geutebrück mid-19th century

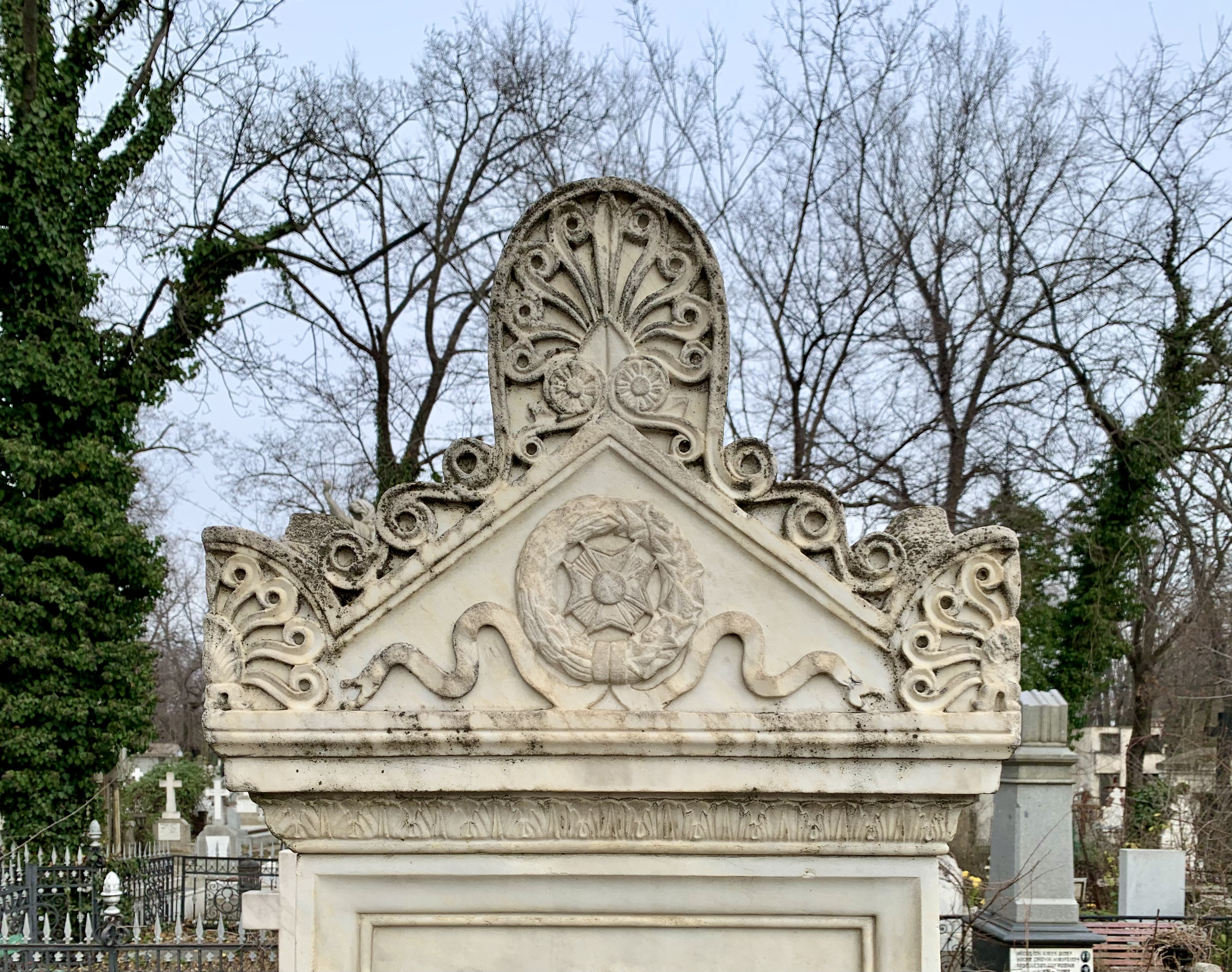
Neoclassical pediment with acroteria of the Grave of Alexandrina Grejdanescu and Barbu Grejdanescu, Bellu Cemetery, Bucharest, Romania, unknown architect or sculptor, c.1871

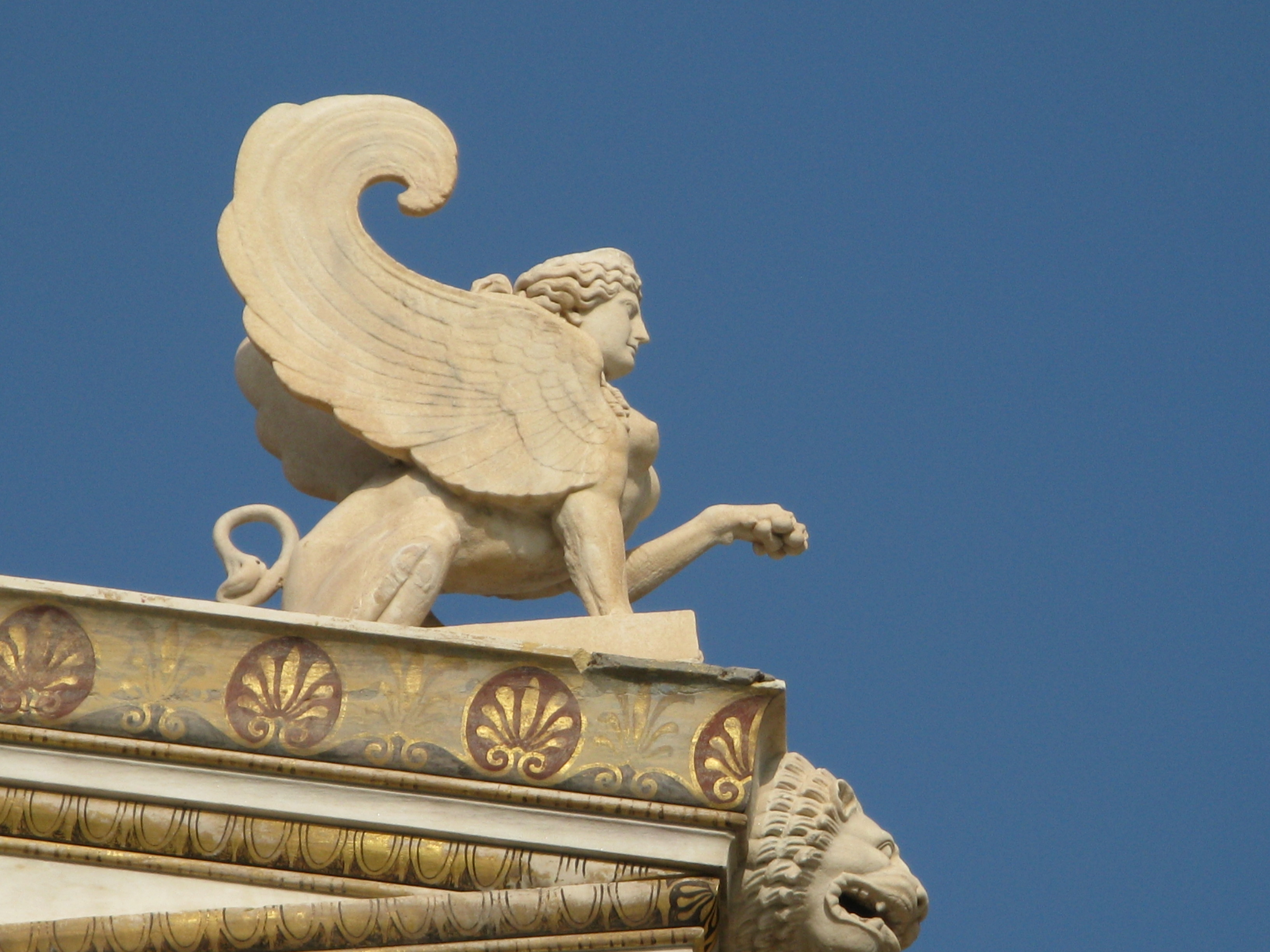
Greek Revival sphinx acroterion of the Academy of Athens, designed by Theophil Hansen, 1885

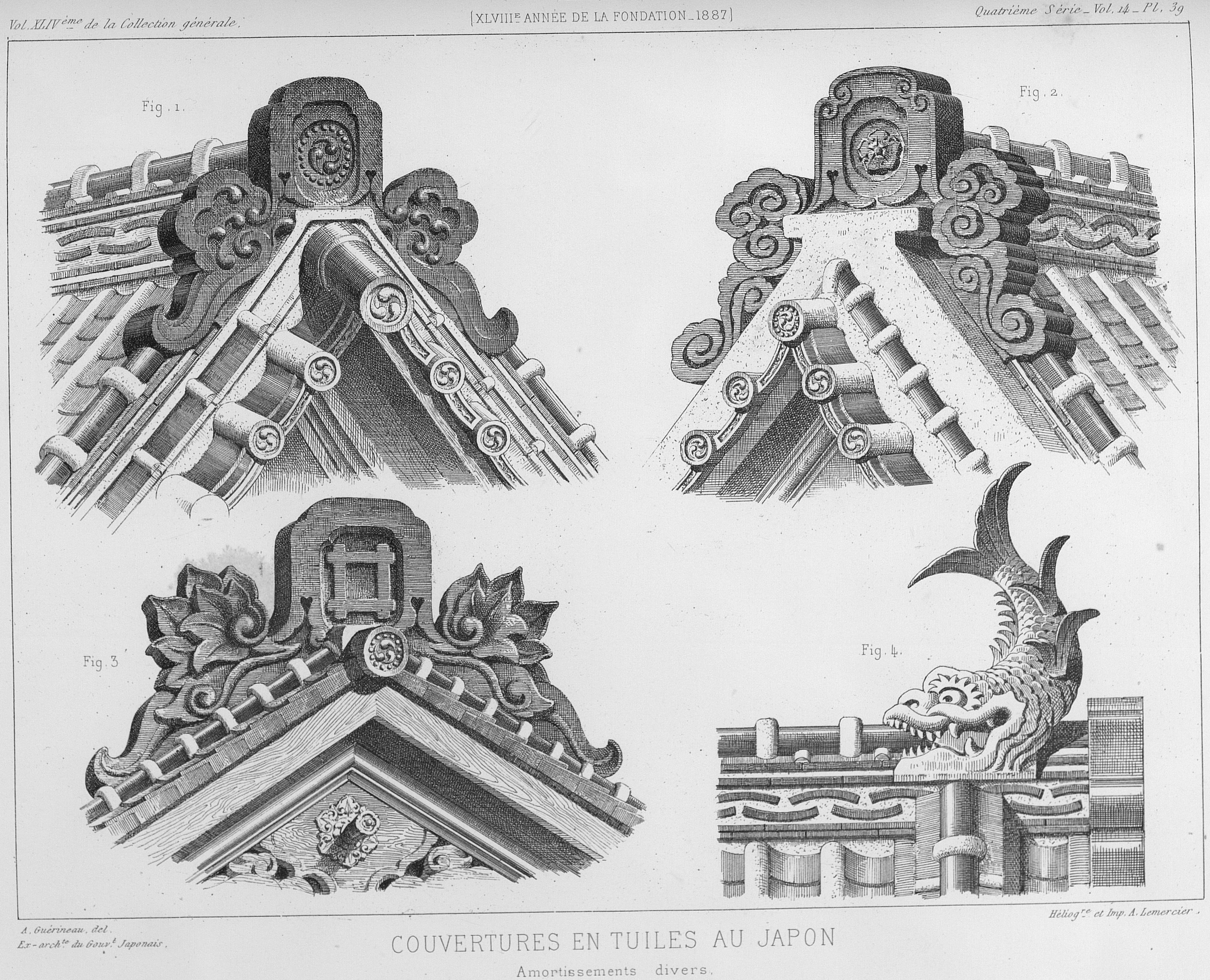
Japanese acroterion, illustrations by Abel Guérineau, 1887

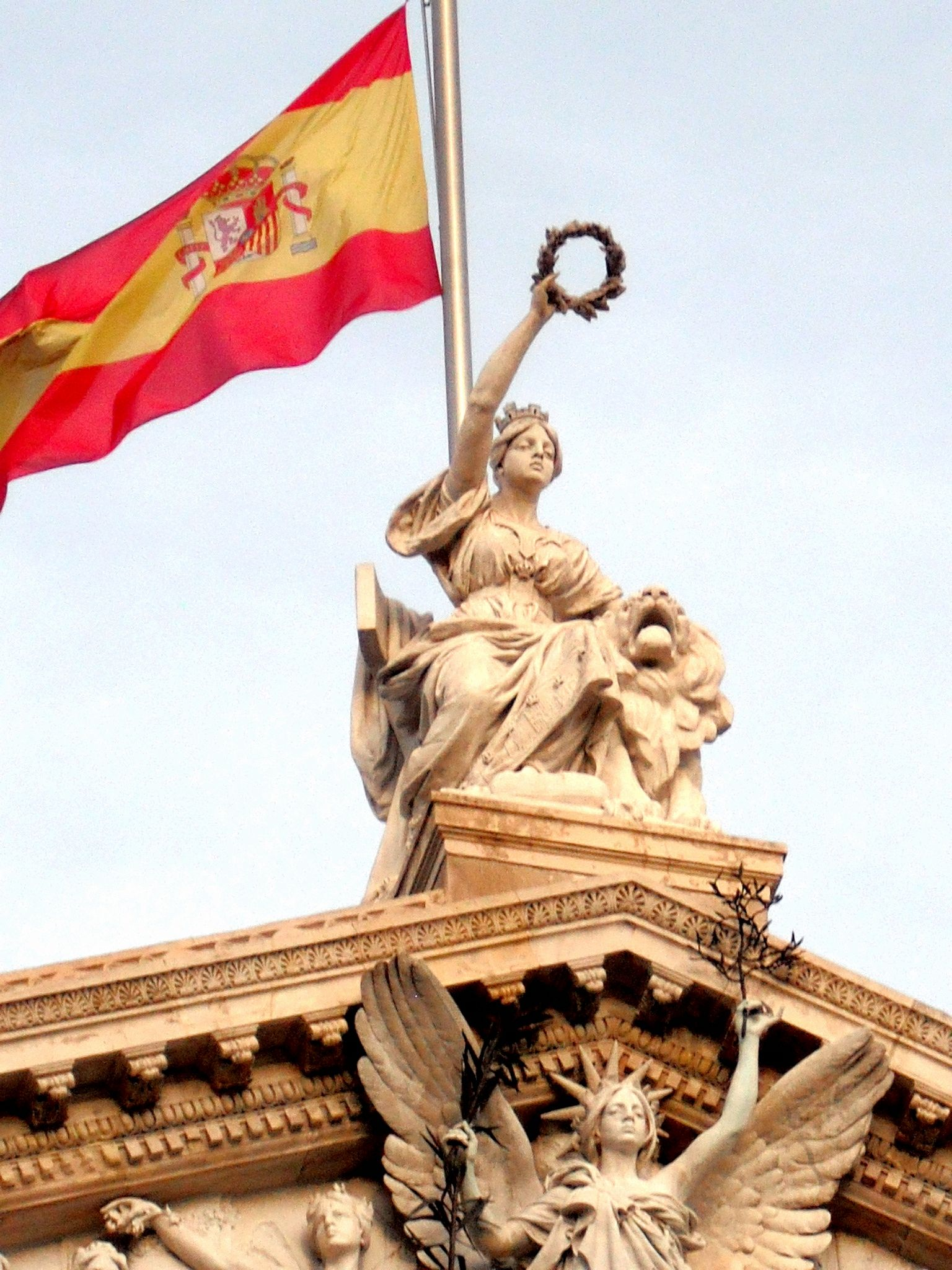
Neoclassical acroterion of Hispania on the Biblioteca Nacional de España, Madrid, by Agustí Querol, 1892–1903

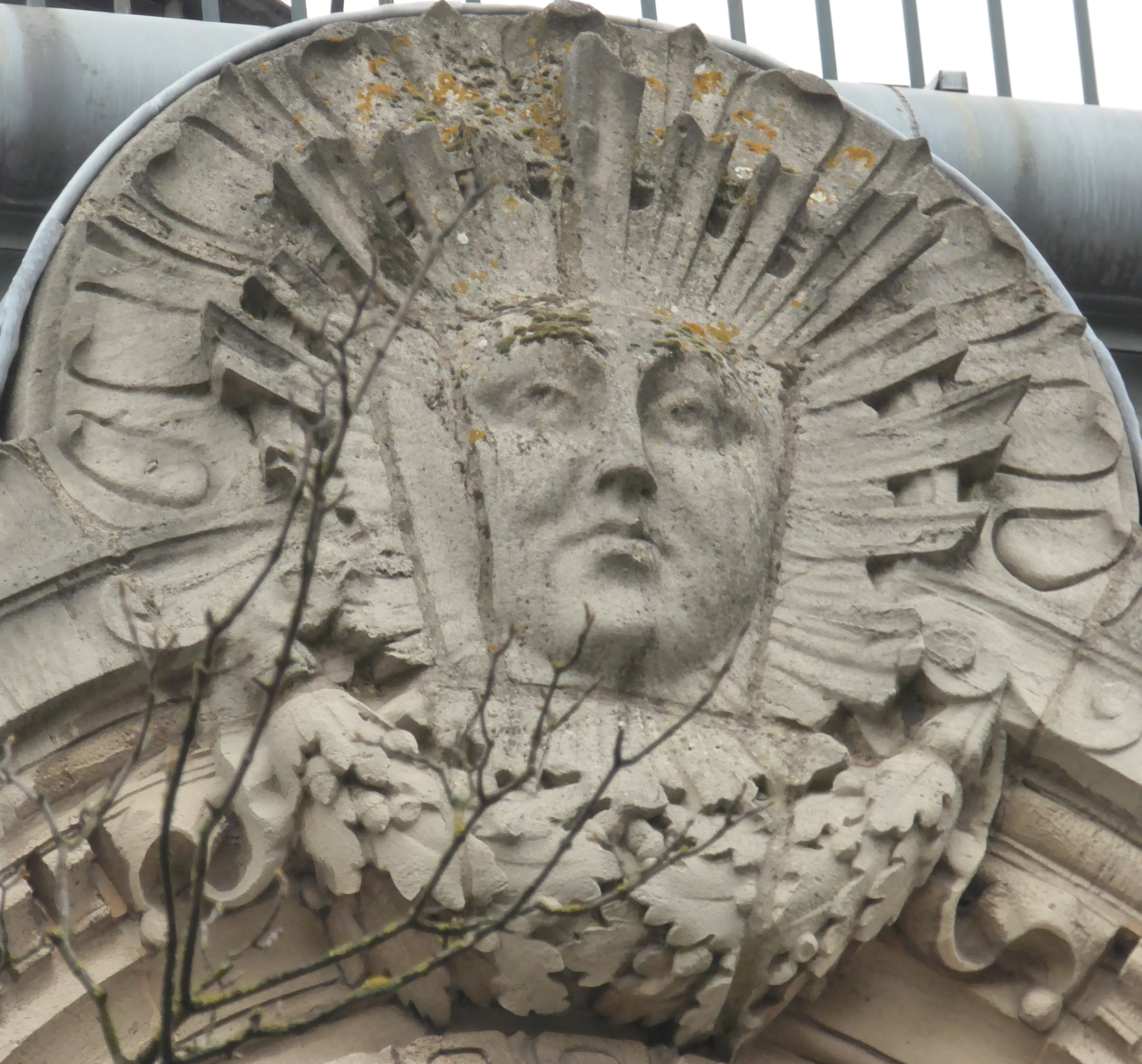
Beaux-Arts acroterion of the Collège Franklin (Boulevard Louis-XIV no. 5), Lille, France, unknown architect or sculptor, c.1900

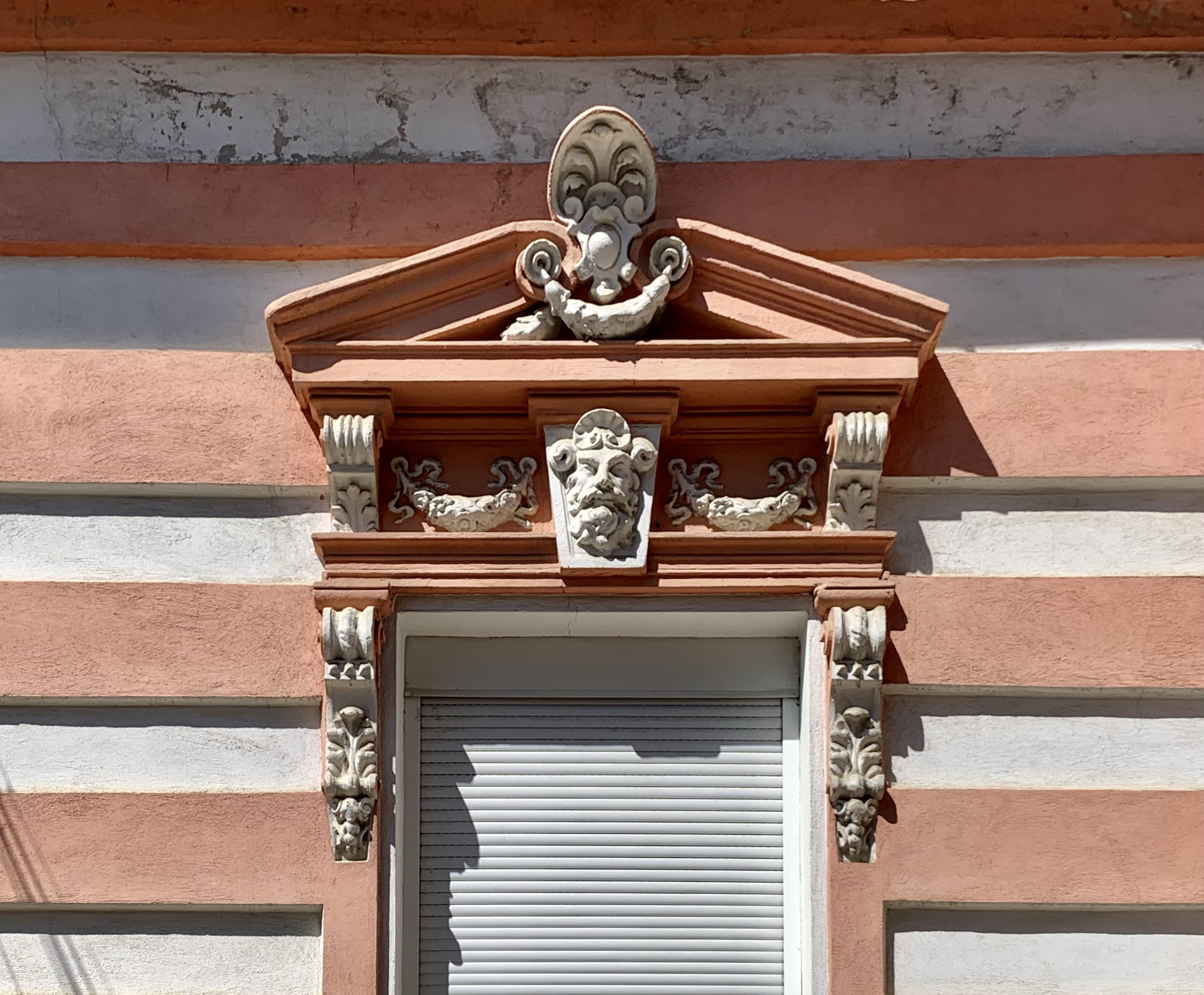
Beaux-Arts acroterion above a window of Strada Grigore Cobălcescu no. 14, Bucharest, unknown architect or sculptor, c.1900

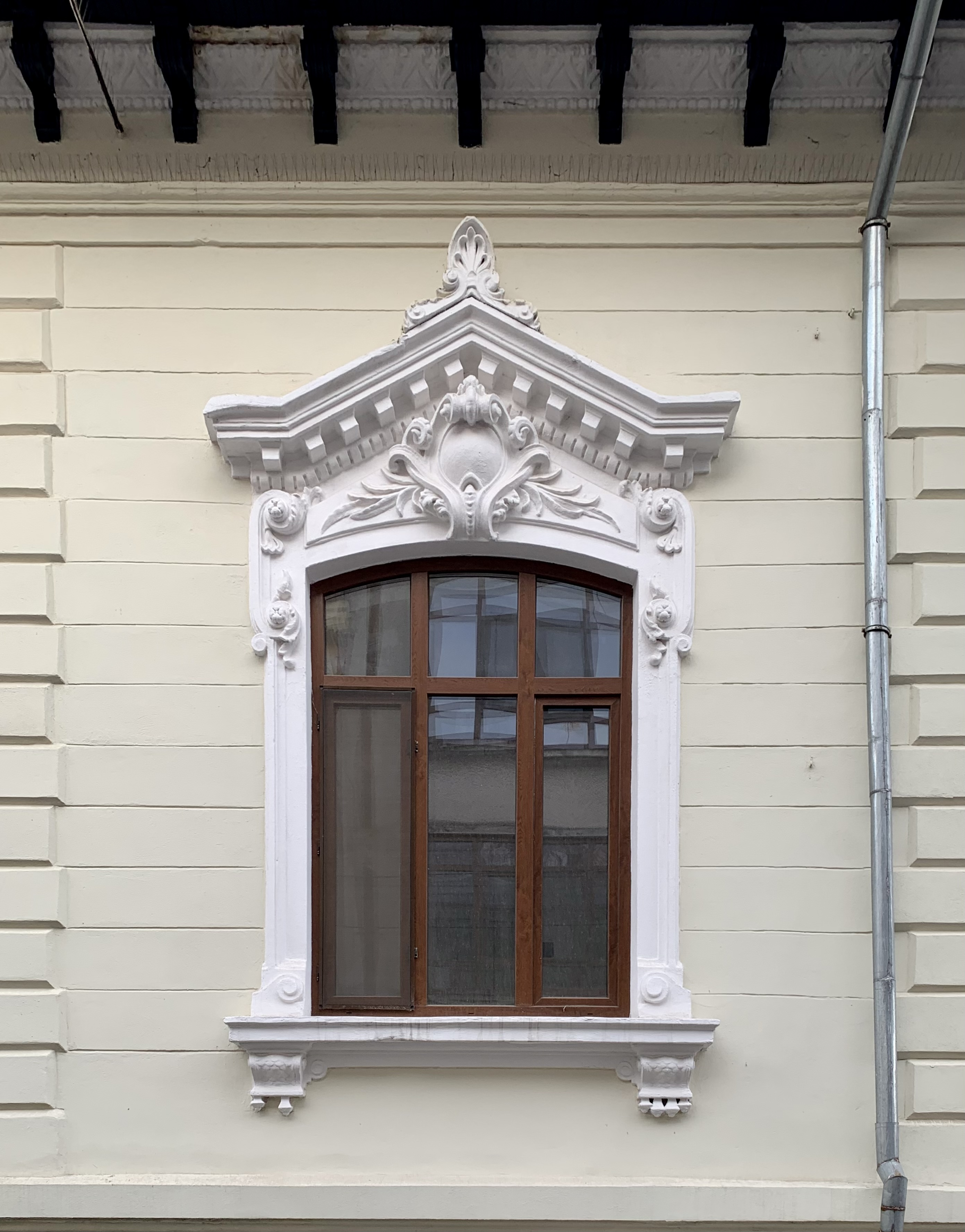
Beaux-Arts acroterion above a window of Strada Bocșa no. 2, Bucharest, unknown architect or sculptor, c.1900

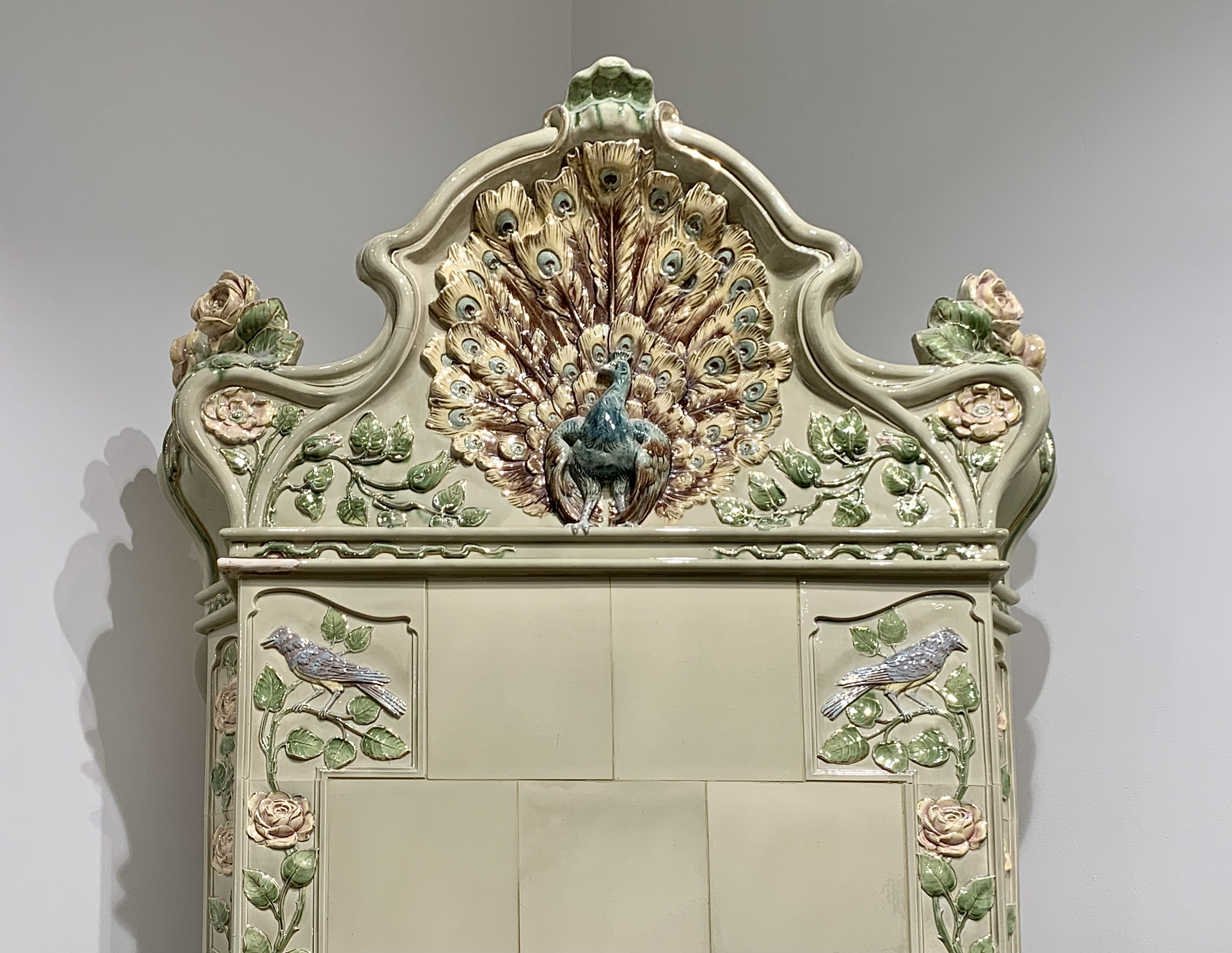
Art Nouveau acroterion of a stove in the Mița the Cyclist House (Strada Biserica Amzei no. 9), Bucharest, possibly designed by Nicolae C. Mihăescu, 1908

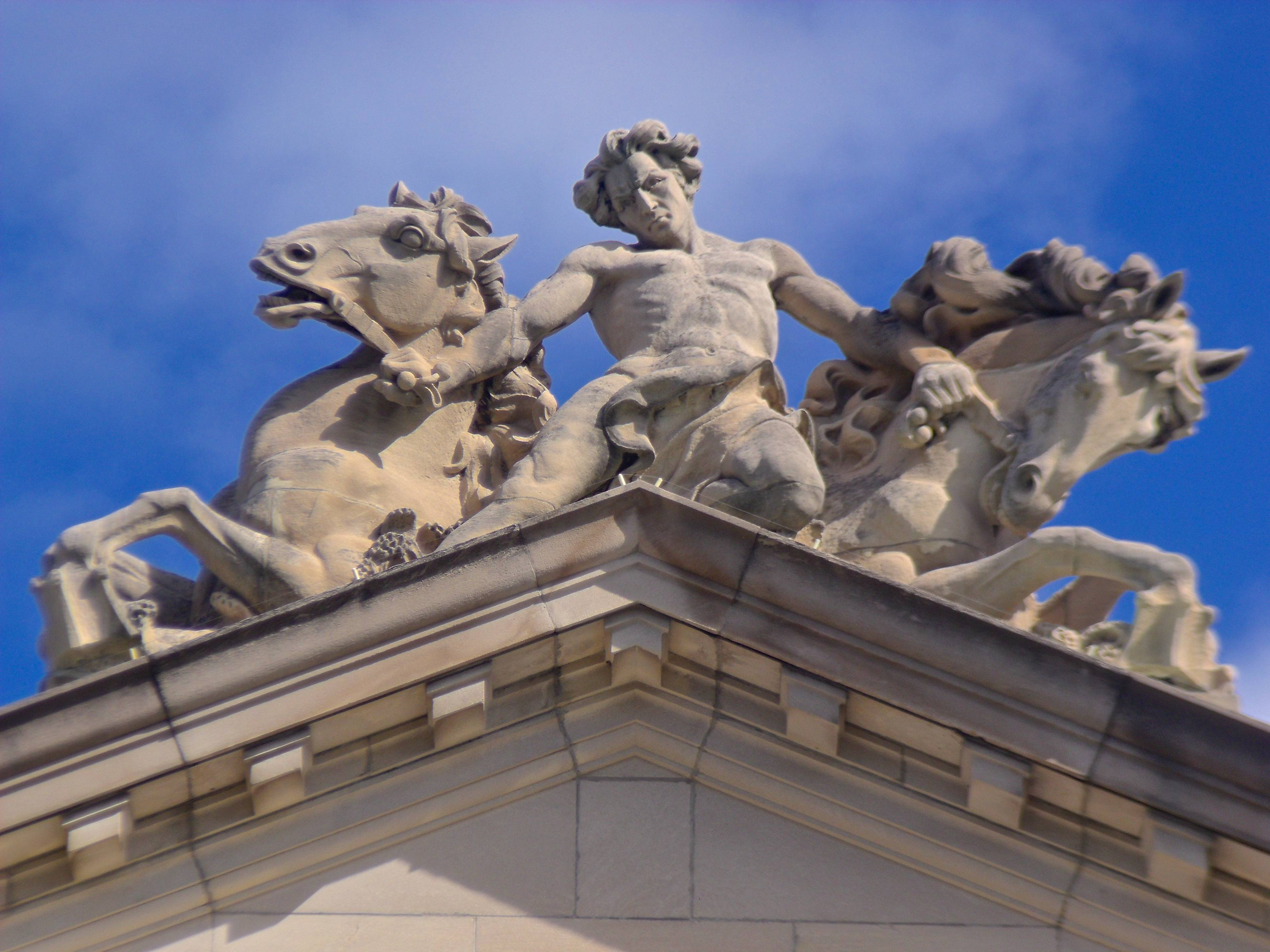
Beaux-Arts acroterion of the Maisonneuve Public Bath and Gymnasium, Montreal, Canada, by Arthur Dubord, 1916

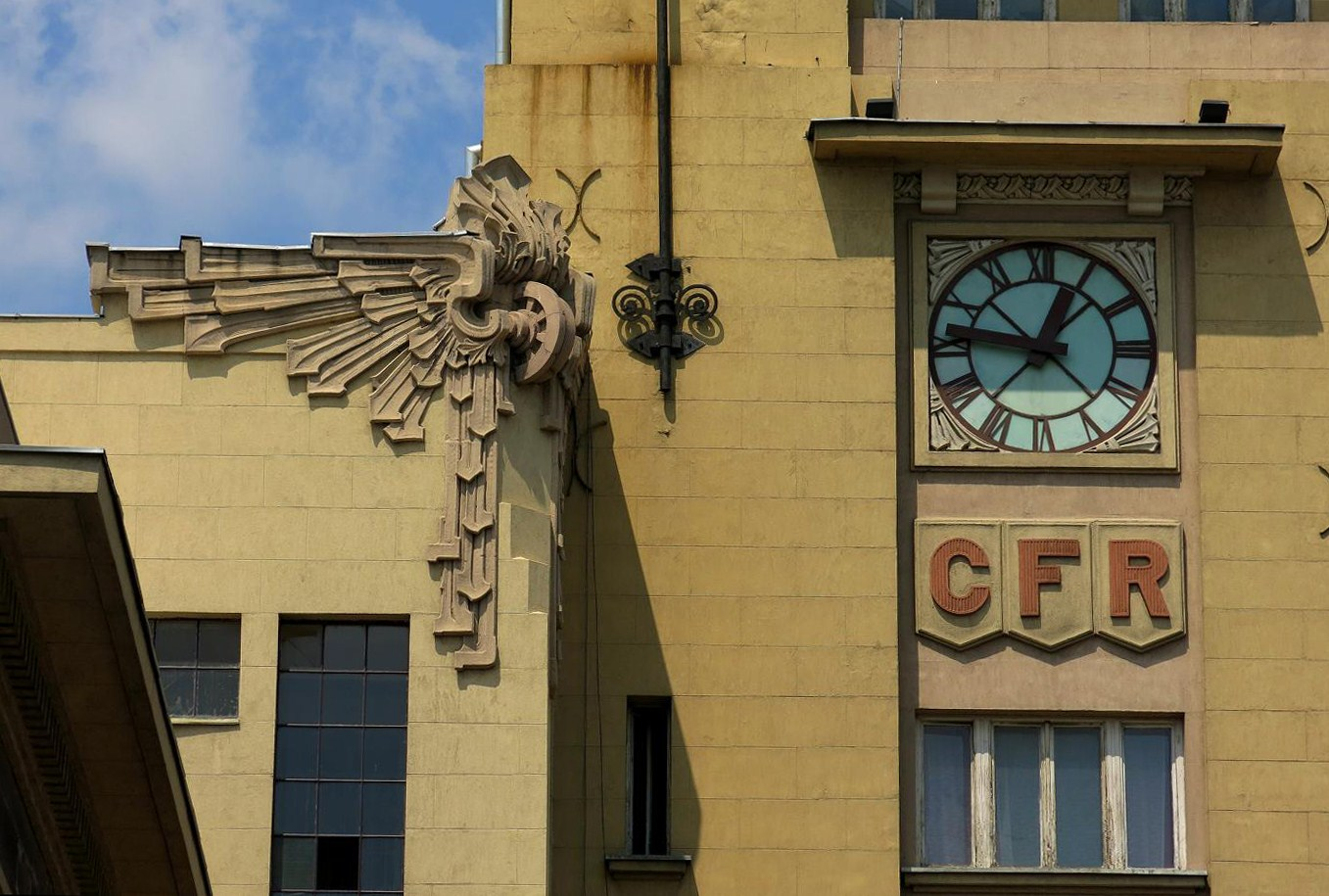
Art Deco acroterion of the Dinicu Golescu Entrance of the Northern Railway Station, Bucharest, designed by Victor Gh. Ștephănescu, 1935

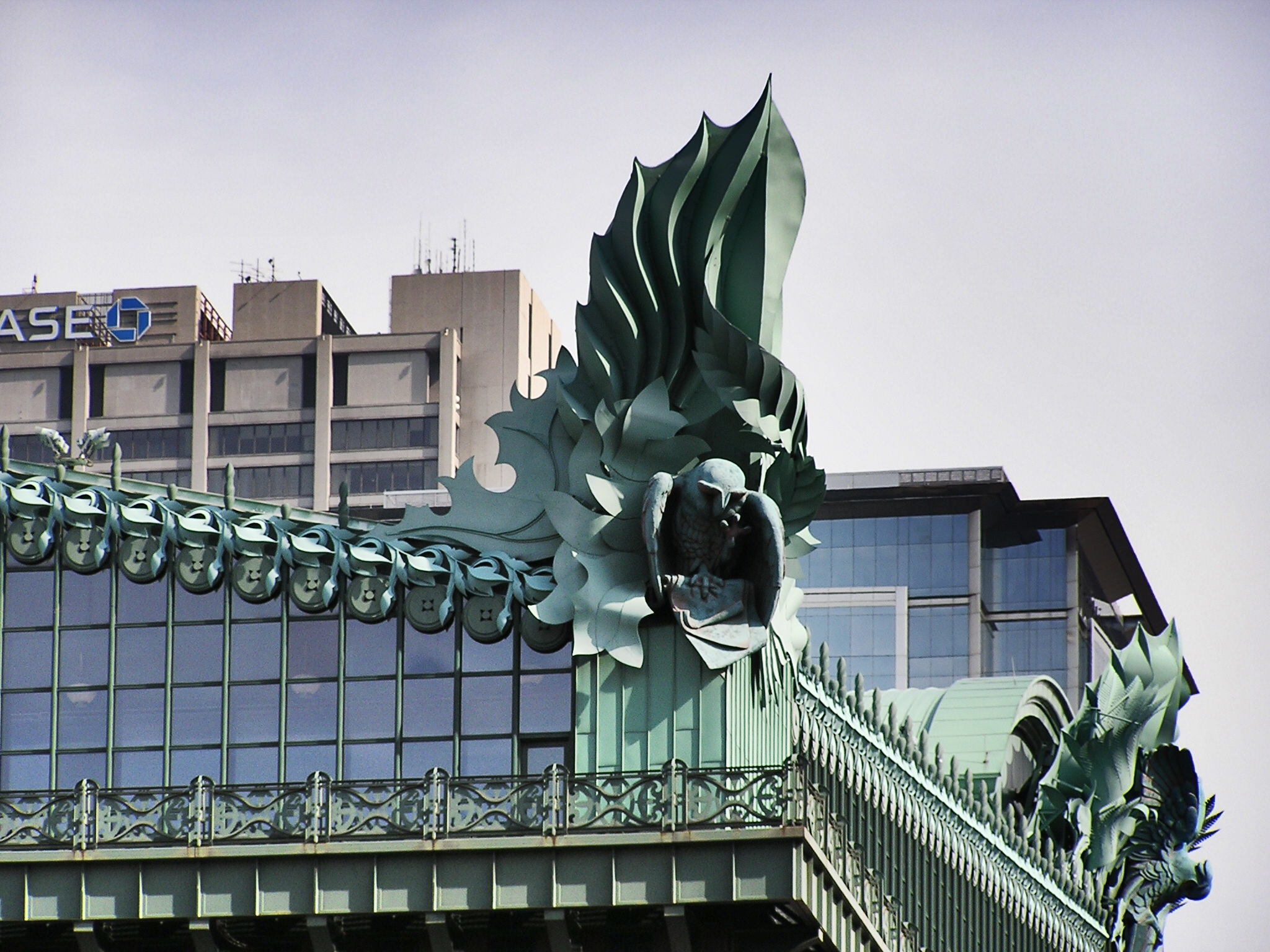
Postmodern acroterion of the Harold Washington Library, Chicago, by Hammond, Beeby & Babka, 1991

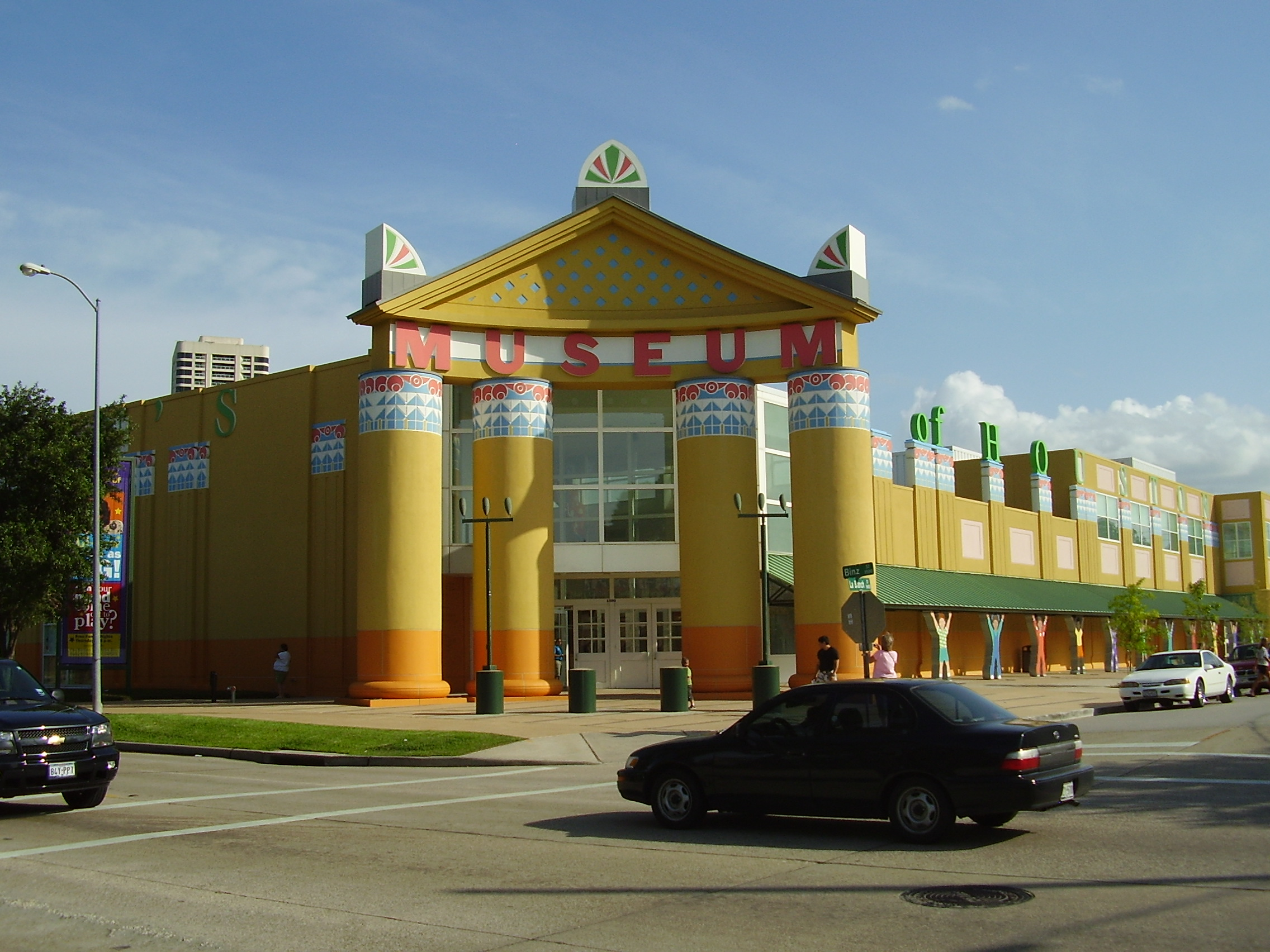
Postmodern acroteria on the pediment of the Children's Museum of Houston, Houston, US, by Robert Venturi, 1992

New Classical acroteria on the pediment of the Maitland Robinson Library, Downing College, Cambridge University, Cambridge, UK, by Quinlan Terry, 1992

== See also ==
- Antefix
- Finial
- List of classical architecture terms
