= Nicolas Charles Seringe =

French physician and botanist (1776–1858)

- Born: 2 December 1776; Longjumeau
- Died: 29 September 1858 (aged 81); 3rd arrondissement of Lyon
- Resting place: Loyasse Cemetery
- Occupation: Botanist
- Awards: Chevalier of the Legion of Honour (1855)

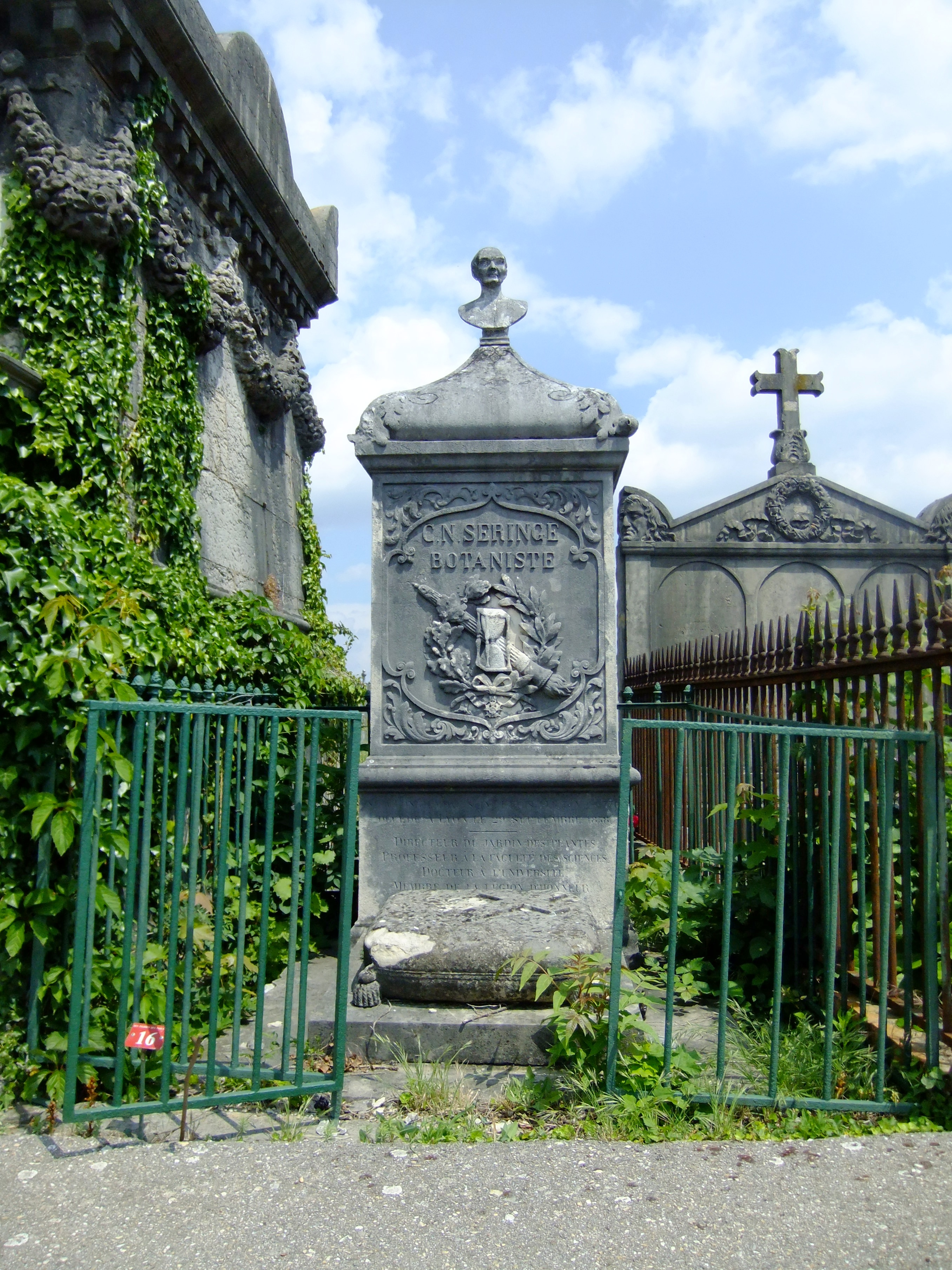
Seringe's grave at the Loyasse Cemetery

Nicolas Charles Seringe (3 December 1776 – 29 December 1858) was a French medical doctor and botanist.

== Biography ==
Seringe was born in Longjumeau. He studied medicine in Paris, and subsequently served as a military surgeon. In this role, he was involved in the German campaign under General Jean Victor Marie Moreau (1763–1813). Afterwards, he left the army and relocated to Bern, where he developed an interest in botany.

From 1801 to 1820, he taught classes in Bern. He started to edit exsiccatae and exsiccata-like works distributing dried specimens in sets, among others Saules de la Suisse (1805–1814), Collection des familles algues, champignons, hypoxylons, lichens (1809) and Exemplaires desséchés de la révision inédite du genre Salix (1824). Some of these series are mainly issued for educational purposes, for example the series Souvenir de la Suisse ou collection de plantes choisies des Alpes (~ 1825). One of his students was Ludwig Schaerer, who later became a pastor and lichenologist. Seringe followed with teaching similar duties in Geneva (1820–1830).

In 1830 he was named the director of the Jardin de Plantes de Lyon, and from 1834 he taught classes at the University of Lyon.

Among his written efforts were an 1815 monograph on willows native to Switzerland, a treatise on Swiss cereal grains titled "Monographie des céréales de la Suisse" (1818) and a work on cereal grains of Europe called "Descriptions et figures des céréales européennes" (1841).

The genus Seringia is named in his honor.

== Learned societies ==
- 1856–1858 : Académie d'agriculture de France
- 1842–1858 : Académie de Stanislas
- 1831–1858 : Académie des sciences, belles-lettres et arts de Lyon
- 1831–1858 : Société d'agriculture de Lyon
- 1844–1865 : Société d'émulation du Jura (corresponding member)
- 1822–1858 : Société de physique et d'histoire naturelle de Genève
- 1844–1858 : Société d’horticulture pratique du Rhône (founding member)
- 1829–1858 : Linnean Society of Lyon
- 1822–1858 : Linnean Society of Paris (corresponding member)

== See also ==
- Category:Taxa named by Nicolas Charles Seringe
