= Guillotière Cemetery =

Cemetery in Lyon, France

- Cimetière de La Guillotière nouveau; Cimetière de La Guillotière ancien
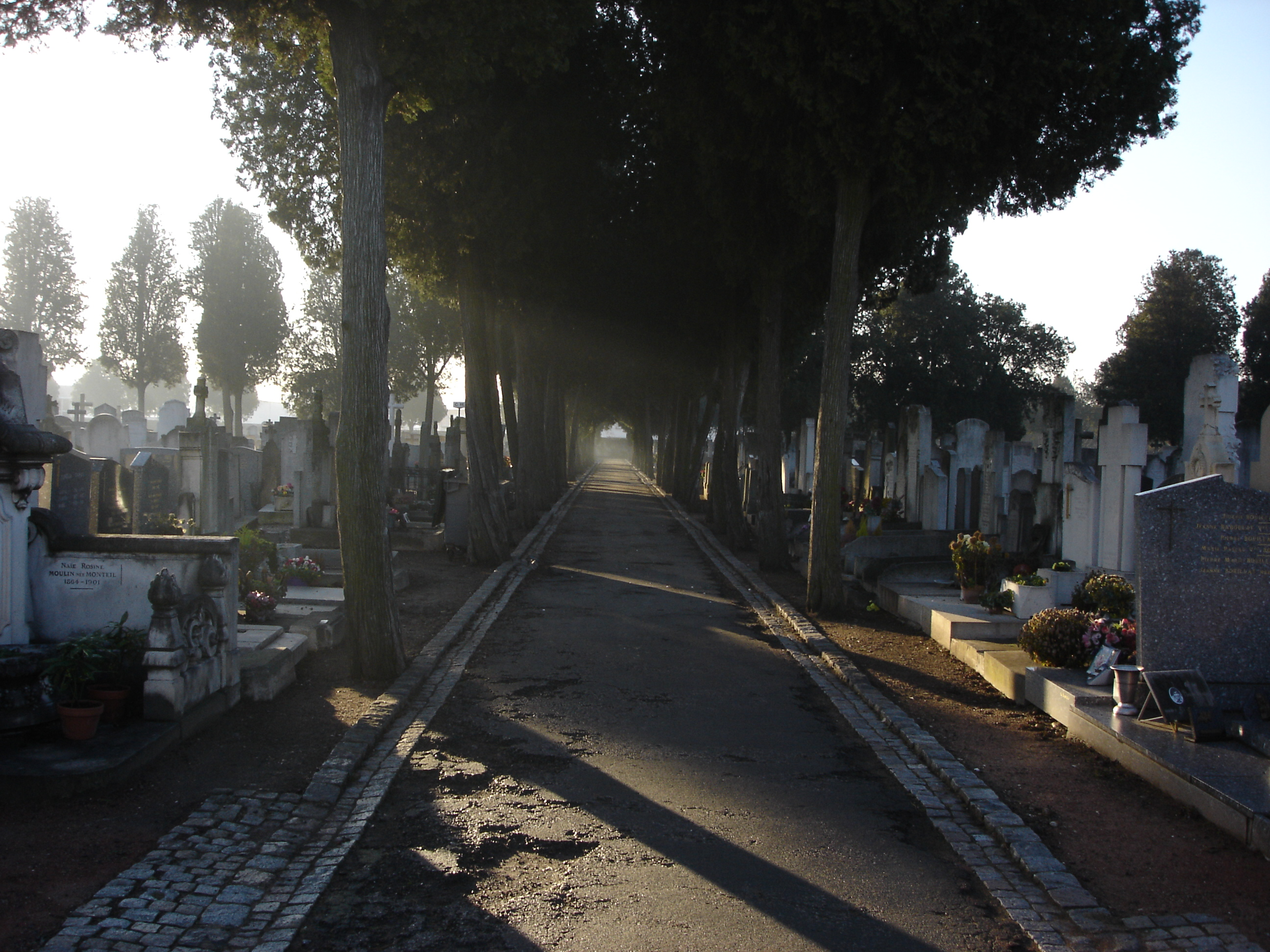
- Row number 3 in the new cemetery
- Interactive map of Guillotière Cemetery

Details
- Established: 1854 (New cemetery); 1822 (Old cemetery)
- Location: Lyon
- Country: France
- Coordinates: 45.7385°N 4.8569°E (New cemetery)
- Size: 18 hectares (44 acres) for the new cemetery
- No. of graves: 40,000
- Website: New cemetery; Old cemetery

Guillotière Cemetery is the name of two adjacent but associated cemeteries in Lyon, France. The two cemeteries are distinguished according to when they were built: the new cemetery (Cimetière de La Guillotière nouveau) was built in 1854 and the old cemetery (Cimetière de La Guillotière ancien) in 1822. They are situated in the La Guillotière neighborhood of the city, in the 7th and 8th arrondissements, just south of Parc Sergent Blandan. They were built to address the shortage of burial spaces in the city. The old cemetery is just north of the new cemetery, and the two are separated by Avenue Berthelot and the railroad tracks connecting Perrache and Part-Dieu railway stations. The new cemetery is the largest in Lyon at 18 hectares (44 acres).

== History ==
Before the end of the 17th century only small church cemeteries existed in Lyon. In 1695 a cemetery named "Cimitière de la Madeleine" was built to accommodate the dead from Hôtel-Dieu de Lyon. In 1807 Cimetière de Loyasse was built on Fourvière hill. These new cemeteries still did not provide enough space for the rapidly growing city, and Guillotière Cemetery was meant to alleviate the growing need for more burial spaces.

The development of Guillotière Cemetery had first been proposed on 1 March 1795 to be built at "Clos Macors", in the commune of La Guillotière, but the cemetery didn't open until 1822. When La Guillotière amalgamated with Lyon in 1852, it became the main cemetery in the city of Lyon. Despite the additional land, by 1854 the space again proved to be insufficient so the new cemetery was constructed to provide additional space for burials.

The cemetery sustained significant damage when it was mistakenly bombed by the American military during the Second World War on 26 May 1944. There is still visible damage on some of the graves at the south end of the new cemetery near rue Pierre Delore.

== Design ==
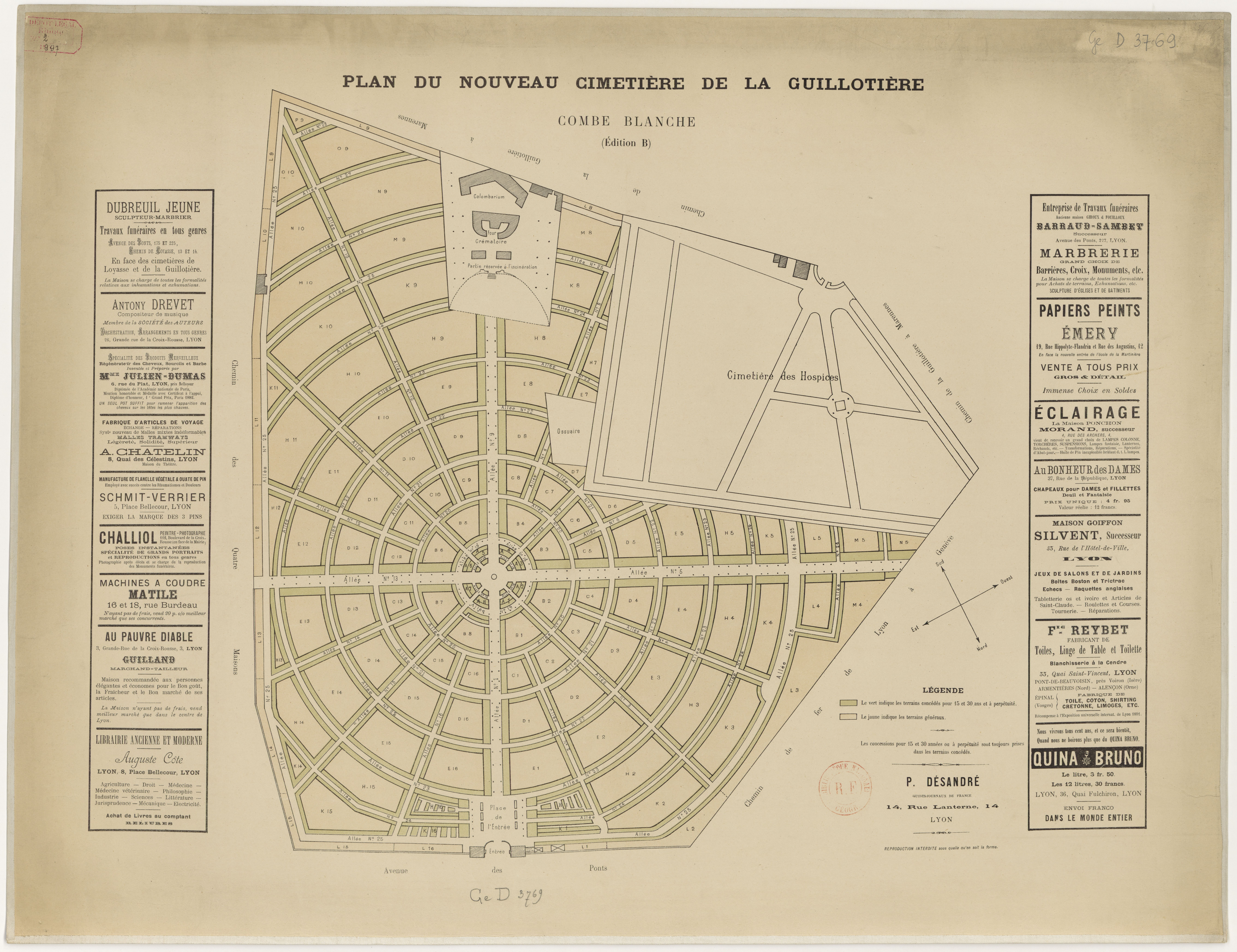
New cemetery blueprint

The new cemetery is organized in concentric circles, and is the largest in the city at 18 hectares (44 acres). As of 2018, the two cemeteries together contained around 40,000 tombs.

A square of child graves, that includes 80 mini crypts, was constructed in 2015 with support from the Hospices Civils de Lyon and the city of Lyon. This construction was to create space after a similar square built in 2009 reached its capacity. The 2015 construction encompasses an area of 450 square metres (4,800 sq ft) and cost around €25,000.

The two cemeteries are separated by Avenue Berthelot and the railroad tracks connecting Perrache and Part-Dieu railway stations.

== Notable interments ==
Several notable people are buried at the cemetery, including:

- Painter Louis-Hector Allemand, died 13 September 1886
- Automobile manufacturer Marius Berliet, died 17 April 1949
- Restaurateur and philanthropist Clotilde Bizolon, died 3 March 1940
- Pilot Élisabeth Boselli, died 25 November 2005
- Author Alphonse Bouvier, died 16 November 1931
- Politician Jules Brunard, died 25 July 1910
- Politician Jean Cagne, died 14 October 1958
- Architect Laurent de Dignoscyo, died 14 November 1876
- Checkers player René Fankhauser, died 30 March 1985
- Soldier Marius-Paul Faurax, died 19 September 1892
- Actor Georges Grey, died 2 April 1954
- Professor and Nobel Prize in Chemistry winner Victor Grignard, died 13 December 1935 (located in section H13)
- Politician Victor Lagrange, died 16 August 1894
- Cinématographe inventors Auguste and Louis Lumière, died 10 April 1954 and 6 June 1948 respectively (buried in location A6 in the new cemetery)
- Pilot and founding director of Air France Henri Lumière, died 4 October 1971
- Henri Malartre Automobile Museum founder Henri Malartre
- Television host Jacques Martin, died 2007
- General officer Benoît Meunier, died 4 January 1845
- Radio and television host Max Meynier, died 23 May 2006
- French ophthalmologist Ferdinand Monoyer, died 11 July 1912
- Inventor Jean-Claude Pompeïen-Piraud, died 24 January 1907
- Circus family Rancy (Cirque Rancy)
- Sculptor François Félix Roubaud, died 13 December 1876
- Free French Air Forces pilot Antoine Rousselot, died 22 May 1999
- Sculptor Jean Verschneider, died 1943
- Self-proclaimed prophet Eugène Vintras, died 7 December 1875

== Gallery ==
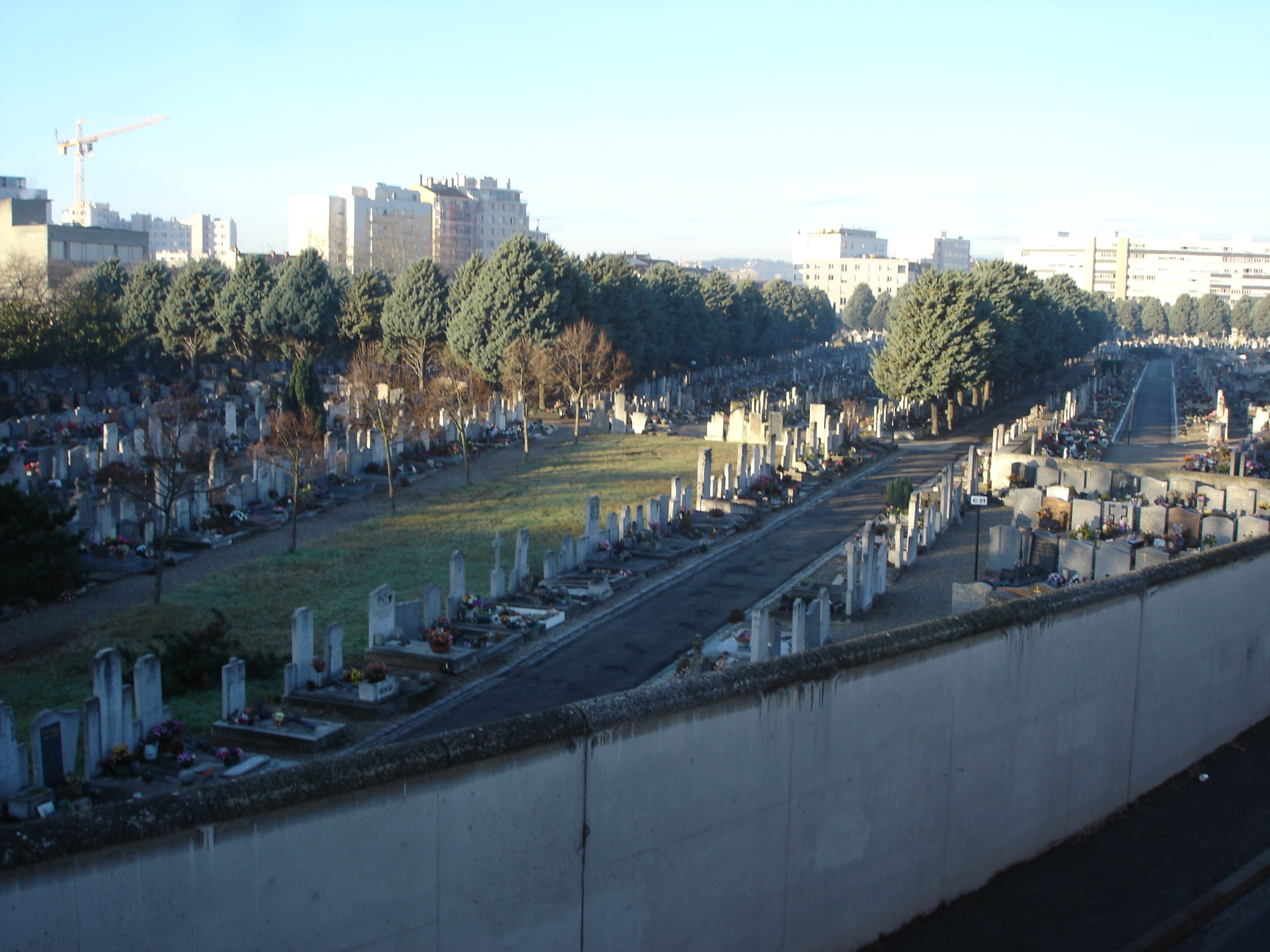
The old cemetery

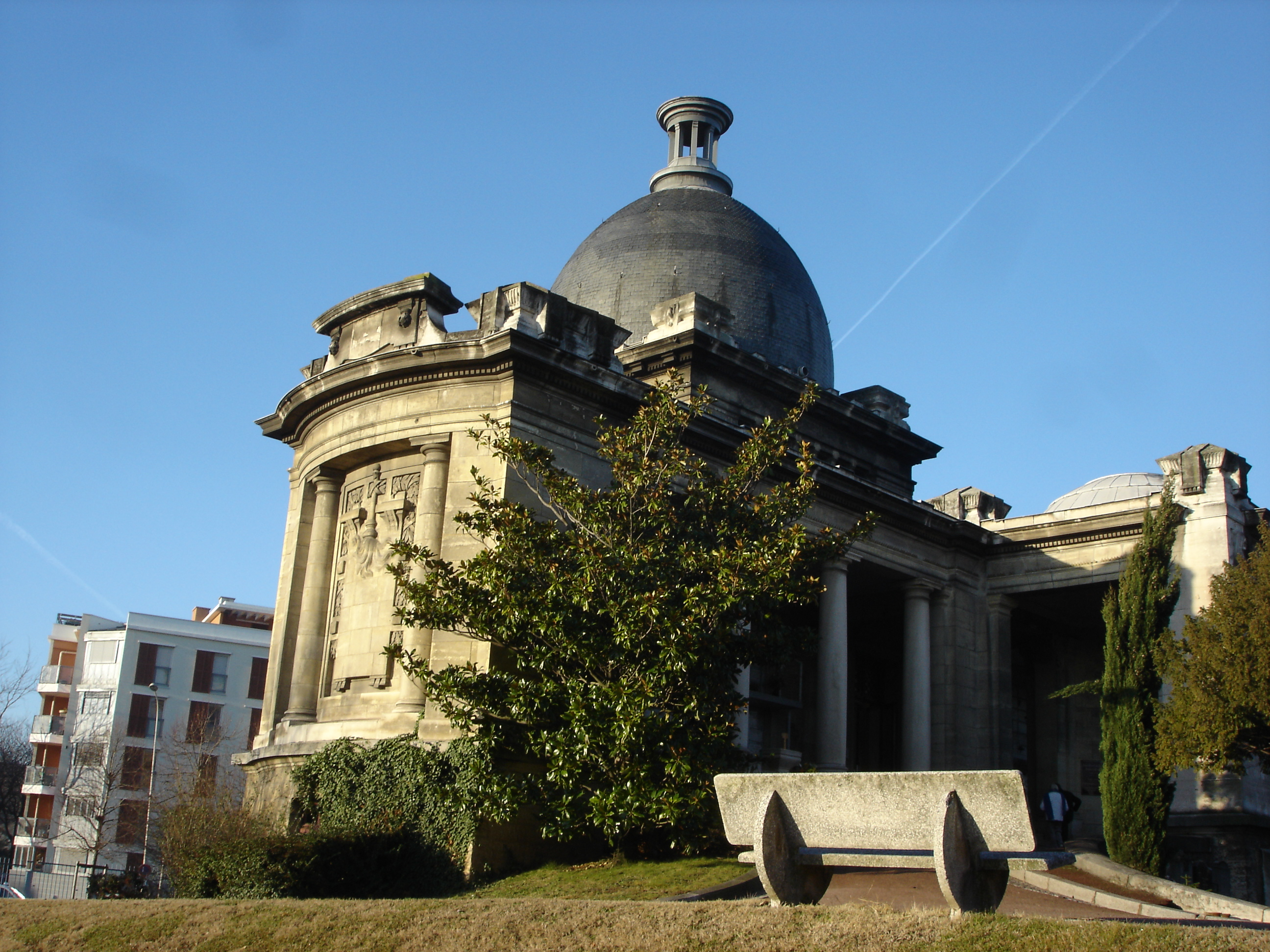
The crematorium in the new cemetery

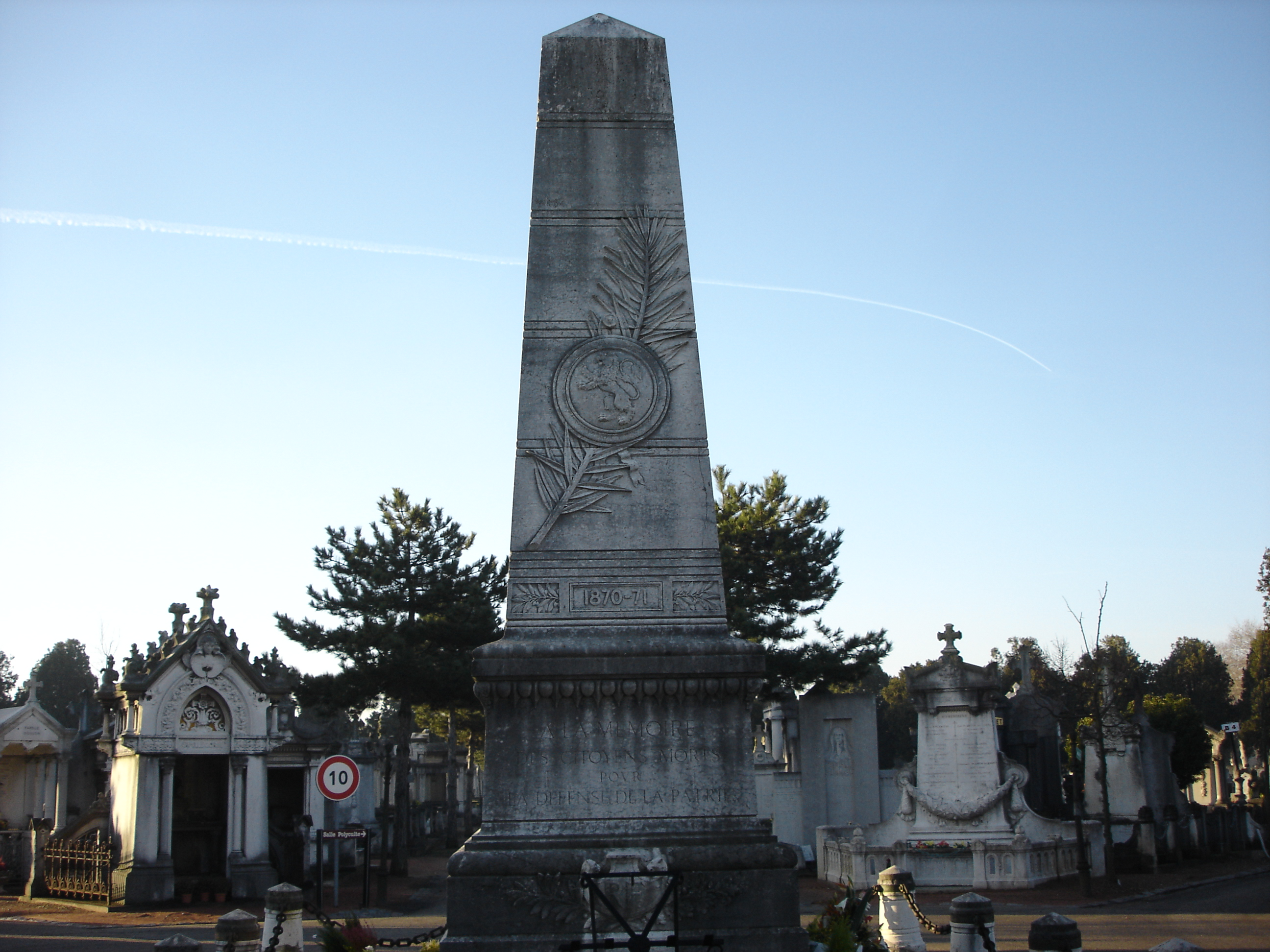
Monument to the dead of the Franco-Prussian War, in the new cemetery

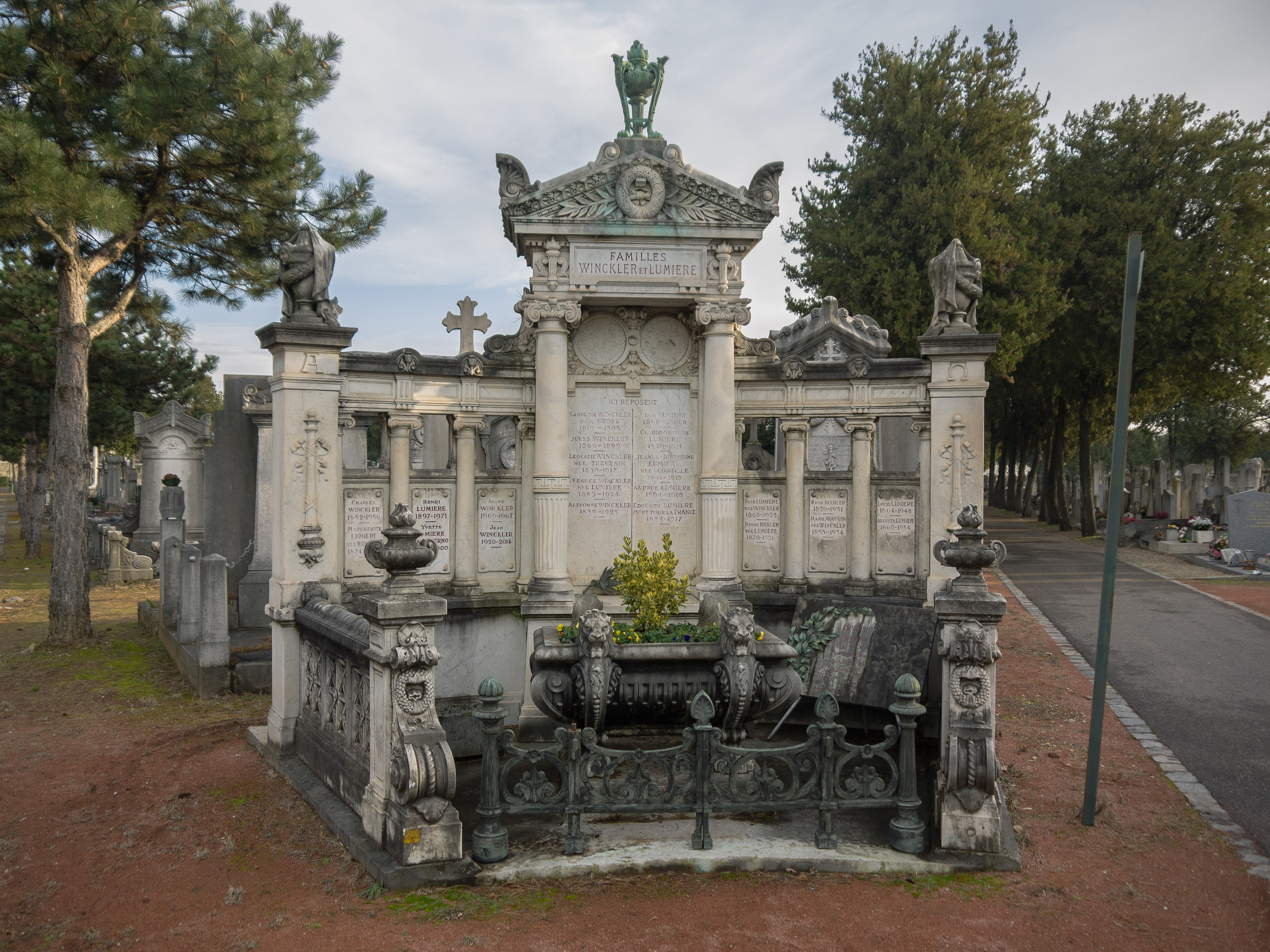
Lumière brothers' family tomb

== See also ==
- List of cemeteries in France
