= Létiévant =

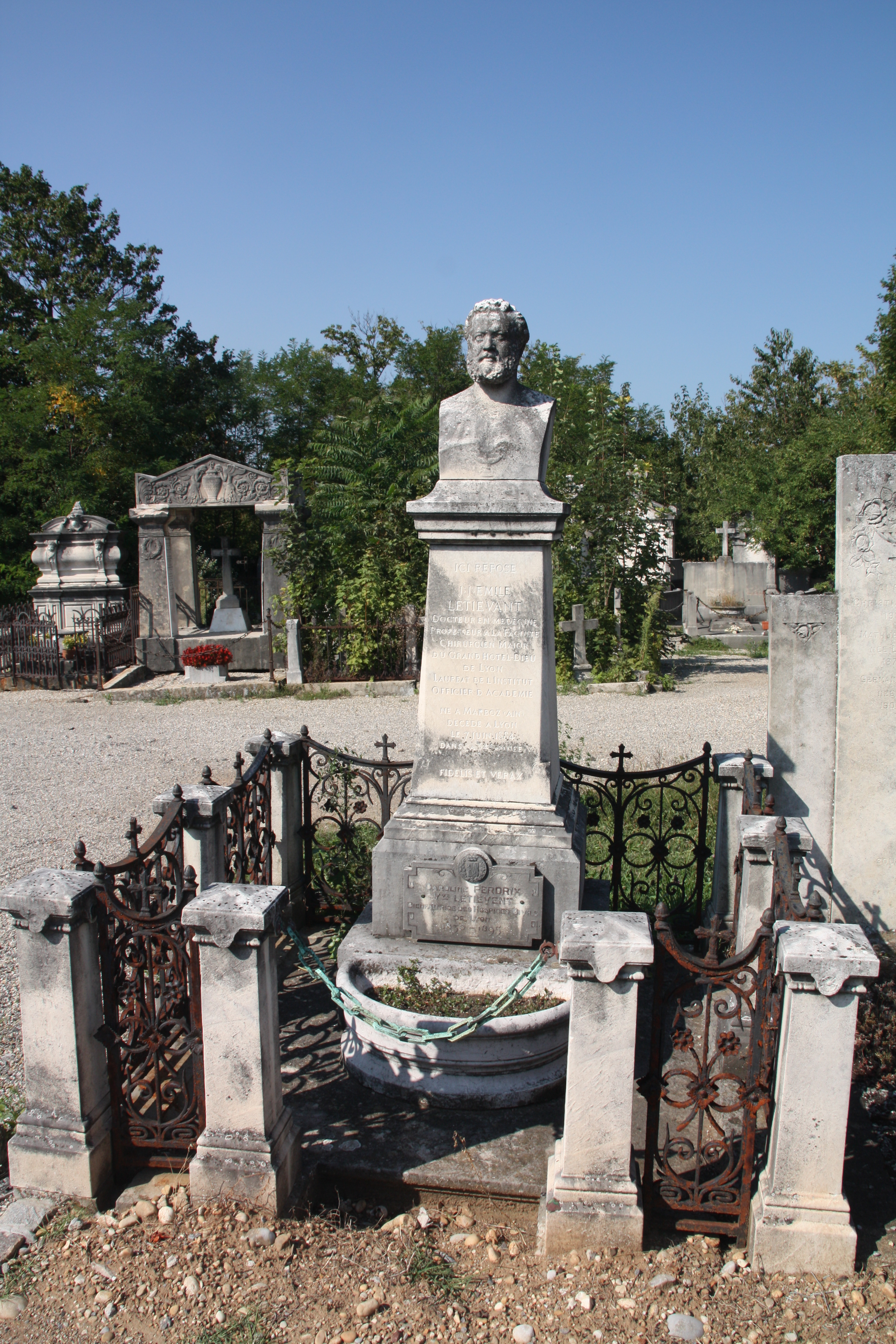
Tomb of Jean Joseph Emile Létiévant at the Cemetery of Loyasse

Jean Joseph Emile Létiévant (1830 in Marboz (Ain Department), Lyons – 1884) was a French surgeon remembered for drawing the first aesthesiography.

== Biography ==
Jean Joseph Emile Létiévant studied medicine in Lyons, Montpellier and Paris. In 1858, he became a medical doctor with his thesis: "Trauma in child-birth compared to ordinary trauma; followed by the relation between an epidemic of puerperal metro-peritonitis at the Lyons Maternity Hospital in 1858". From 1861 to 1865, he was head of the Surgical Clinic at the Lyons Medical School. In 1867, he was appointed head surgeon at the Hôtel-Dieu hospital in Lyons. In 1873, he also became assistant professor of anatomy and physiology.

From 1858 to 1880, Létiévant published a book and forty articles. The French Academy of Science awarded him the sum of one thousand francs for his treatise on nervous sections.

The treatise of nervous sections is a 548-page book which mentions 226 references in five languages: Latin, French, English, Italian, and German. Létiévant had not only read Galen and Ambroise Paré, but Paul Broca, Charles-Édouard Brown-Séquard, and even Silas Weir Mitchell. Two of the main topics of this treatise are: 1. Aesthesiography (from the Greek: aisthêsis) a new concept proposed by Létiévant, is a map of the incomplete anaesthesia which "facilitates the interpretation" of the cutaneous nerve lesions. Létiévant presents nine illustrations drawn by himself. 2. Tingling sign. Létiévant had already observed that pressure over the median nerve at the site of the repair or at a point distal to the repair, caused painful tingling in the fingers. It was then, in 1915, correctly interpreted as Tinel's sign.

In 1869, Létiévant, at several meetings of the medical society in Lyons, asked his colleagues their opinion on the possibility of repairing a radial nerve transsection. He repaired it on 4 August.

At Létiévant’s funeral, his pupil, friend and successor at the Hôtel-Dieu as head surgeon, Daniel Mollière said: "Saying goodbye to this great soul who has just entered into eternity, let us write on his tomb these two words from the Book of Revelations, which define him so well: FIDELIS ET VERAX".
