= List of cemeteries in France =

This is a list of cemeteries in France.

- Cimetière de Bagneux, Paris – burial place for Jean Vigo, Gribouille, Alfred Jarry and others.
- Catacombs of Paris, millions of remains in caves and tunnels under the city of Paris.
- Cimetière de Batignolles, Paris, resting place of France's famous sons André Breton and Paul-Marie Verlaine, among others.
- Cimetière des Gonards, Versailles, burial place for Edith Wharton, Pierre Napoleon Bonaparte and others.
- Cimetière de La Guillotière, Lyon
- Cimetière de Loyasse, Lyon
- Grand Jas Cemetery, Cannes – buried here are Lily Pons, Peter Carl Fabergé, Martine Carol and other celebrities
- Cimetière de Levallois-Perret, Paris, resting place of Maurice Ravel, Louise Michel (The Red Virgin) and Gustave Eiffel
- Les Invalides, Paris – war heroes including Napoleon
- Cimetière de Montmartre, Paris – resting place of Edgar Degas, Heinrich Heine, Georges Feydeau, the Cancan dancer, known as La Goulue (Louise Weber) among other artists (notably Dalida and Vaslav Nijinsky) and writers (like Alexandre Dumas, fils). But also many others. Émile Zola was initially buried here, but his remains were later moved to the Panthéon. His gravestone can still be seen here, however.
- Cimetière du Montparnasse, Paris – serves the great artistic quarter of Montparnasse, including the graves of Charles Baudelaire, Eugène Ionesco, Samuel Beckett, Jean-Paul Sartre, Jean Seberg, Serge Gainsbourg and Man Ray. Pierre Laval and Porfirio Díaz are also buried here among many, many others.
- Neuilly-sur-Seine community cemetery – resting place of Anatole France among others.
- Panthéon, Paris – France's most honored, including Voltaire, Jean-Jacques Rousseau and Émile Zola.
- Cimetière de Pantin in Paris is the burial site of the singer Damia, and other notables.
- Cimetière de Passy, Paris – Claude Debussy, Édouard Manet and many others.
- Cimetière du Père Lachaise, Paris – resting place of famous persons such as Colette, Baron Georges Haussmann, Eugène Delacroix, Oscar Wilde, Jim Morrison, Molière, Maurice Merleau-Ponty, Gertrude Stein, Édith Piaf, Marcel Proust and Frédéric Chopin. Many French Holocaust victims (and their camps) are commemorated there.
- Saint Denis Basilica, Paris – burial site for French Royalty.
- Cimetière de Saint-Ouen, Paris – where, on 24 May 1430, Joan of Arc was told to recant or face summary execution. Some of those buried here are the painters Suzanne Valadon, Jules Pascin, and tennis star Suzanne Lenglen.
- Saint Remi Basilica, Reims, Champagne-Ardenne, France
- Cimetière Saint-Vincent, a small cemetery in the Montmartre Quarter of Paris contains the graves of such notables as Arthur Honegger, Marcel Carné, Maurice Utrillo, Eugène Boudin and others.
- Saint Roch Cemetery, Grenoble, painters, sculptors and mayors.
- Besancon (St. Claude) Communal Cemetery, Doubs.
- Protestant Cemetery, Bordeaux - is a multinational Protestant cemetery in Bordeaux.
- Protestant Cemetery, Montpellier - is the oldest cemetery in continuous use in Montpellier.

== Foreign cemeteries ==
- Aisne-Marne American Cemetery and Memorial
- Bény-sur-Mer Canadian War Cemetery
- Bretteville-sur-Laize Canadian War Cemetery
- Brittany American Cemetery and Memorial
- Epinal American Cemetery and Memorial
- Lafayette Escadrille Cemetery and Memorial
- Lorraine American Cemetery and Memorial
- Meuse-Argonne American Cemetery
- Normandy American Cemetery and Memorial
- Oise-Aisne American Cemetery and Memorial
- Orglandes German war cemetery
- Orry-la-Ville, Dutch War Cemetery
- Rhone American Cemetery and Memorial
- Somme American Cemetery and Memorial
- Sainte-Geneviève-des-Bois Russian Cemetery: Ivan Bunin, Rudolph Nureyev, Felix Yusupov, Andrei Tarkovsky
- St. Mihiel American Cemetery and Memorial
- Suresnes American Cemetery and Memorial
