= Jules Brunard =

French politician

Jules Brunard (6 May 1837, Cublize – 25 July 1910) was a French politician. He belonged to the Radical Party. He was a member of the Chamber of Deputies from 1902 to 1910. He died 25 July 1910 and was buried in the Guillotière Cemetery in Lyon.
