= Loyasse Cemetery =

Cemetery in Lyon, France

Loyasse Cemetery Cimetière de Loyasse
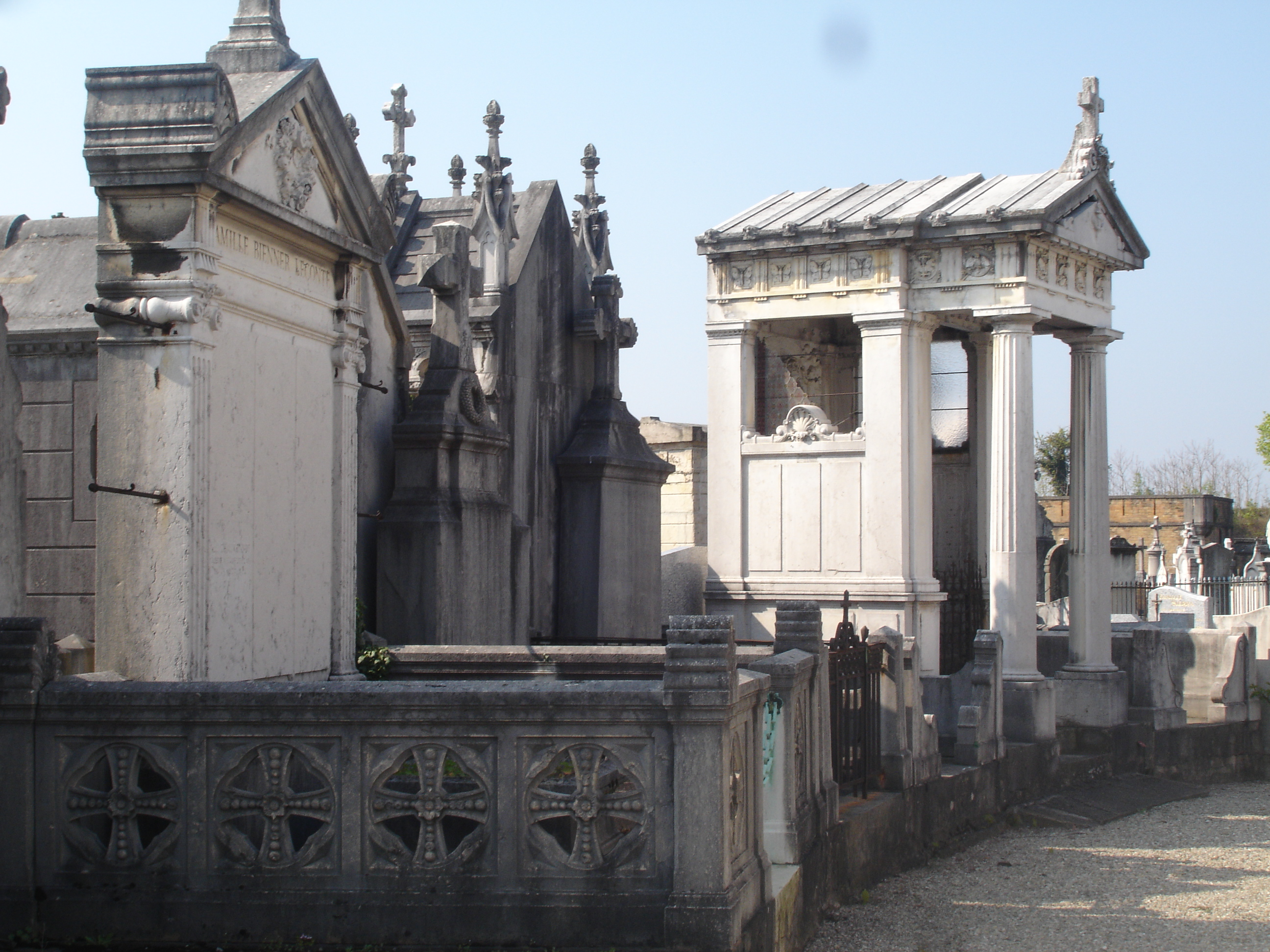
- View of the cemetery
- Interactive map of Loyasse Cemetery; Cimetière de Loyasse

Details
- Coordinates: 45°45′44″N 4°48′43″E

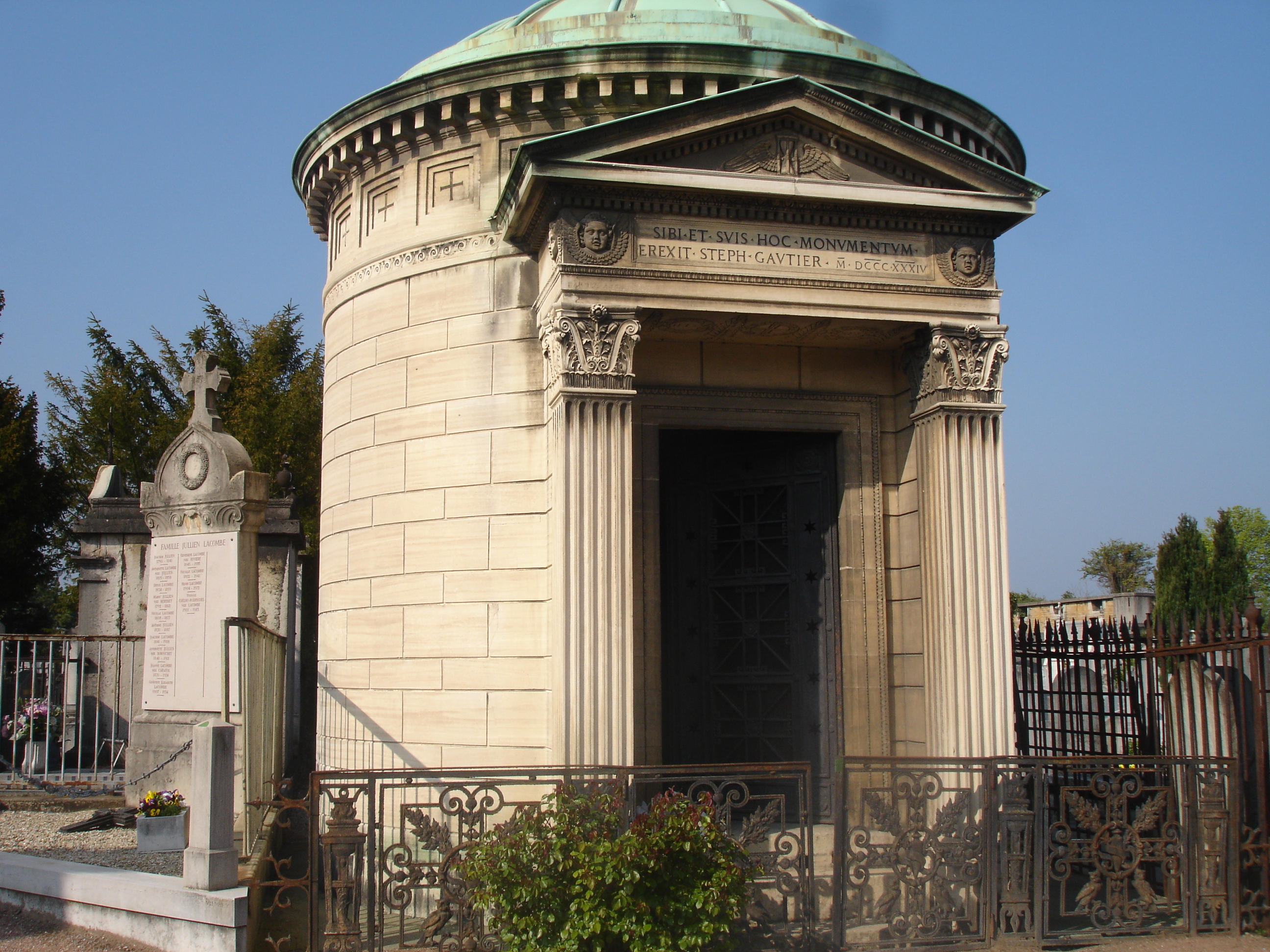
Gautier family mausoleum

Loyasse Cemetery (French: Cimetière de Loyasse) is a cemetery in the city of Lyon, France. The cemetery is located on the Fourvière hill in the western part of the city, not far away from the Metallic tower of Fourvière and Notre-Dame de Fourvière.

It is the 'richer' cemetery of Lyon, when compared with the Cimetière de La Guillotière, with elaborate graves in various architectural styles.

== Notable interments ==
- Pierre Bossan, architect of the Basilica of Notre-Dame de Fourvière
- Sante Geronimo Caserio, Italian anarchist and assassin
- Ferdinand Ferber (1862–1909), French aviator.
- Émile Guimet (1836–1918), founder of the Guimet Museum
- Édouard Herriot (1872–1957), French Radical politician of the Third Republic who served three times as Prime Minister
- Létiévant (1830–1884), French surgeon remembered for drawing the first aesthesiography.
- Nizier Anthelme Philippe (1849–1905)
- Jean-Pierre Pléney
- Nicolas Charles Seringe (1776–1858), French physician and botanist
- Jean-Baptiste Willermoz
- Benjamin Woodward, Irish architect (1816-1861)

== See also ==
- List of cemeteries in France

== Sources ==
- Pelletier, Jean, nd: Connaître son arrondissement: le 5e, pp. 58–50. Éditions lyonnaise d'art et d'histoire
