= Lawrence Watt-Evans bibliography =

This list of works by American science fiction and fantasy author Lawrence Watt-Evans.

== Works ==
=== Fantasy ===
==== The Lords of Dûs series ====
- The Lure of the Basilisk (1980)
- The Seven Altars of Dûsarra (1981)
- The Sword of Bheleu (1982)
- The Book of Silence (1984)

==== The Worlds of Shadow series ====
- Out of This World (1993)
- In the Empire of Shadow (1995)
- The Reign of the Brown Magician (1996)

==== The Obsidian Chronicles ====
- Dragon Weather (1999)
- The Dragon Society (2001)
- Dragon Venom (2003)

==== The Legends of Ethshar series ====
Ethshar is a constructed world which was first developed by Watt-Evans for use in role-playing games, and in which he set a number of novels and short stories. These usually stand alone and don't need to be read in a particular order.

The inhabitants of the World live on a massive sheer-sided plateau surrounded by poisonous yellow mists. The World has a sun, and two moons, and stars can be seen in the sky, but it is not expressly stated to be upon a planet. Ethshar is the common name of three large cities in the major civilization of this world: Ethshar of the Spices, Ethshar of the Sands, and Ethshar of the Rocks, making up a political entity called the Hegemony of the Three Ethshars. To the southeast of the Hegemony is where the original "Old Ethshar" once was. The former Ethshar, which became embroiled in a generations-long war with the Northern Empire, broke up into more than two hundred statelets collectively called the Small Kingdoms before the end of the "Great War".

A notable feature of Ethshar is that there are many distinct different varieties of magic, each with its own laws. Some, like the telekinesis exhibited by Ethshar's warlocks, seem to owe more influence to science fiction than fantasy. Some forms of magic, in particular wizardry, are powerful enough to create other universes.

The first six Ethshar novels were published by Ballantine's Del Rey imprint, all of them being accepted and nominally edited by Lester Del Rey. The 7th and 8th were published by Tor Books, but disappointing sales led Tor to ask Watt-Evans to concentrate on his non-Ethshar material, which generated much better sales. After writing several non-Ethshar fantasy novels for Tor, Watt-Evans began experimentally serializing the 9th Ethshar novel, The Spriggan Mirror, on his website under a modified form of the Street Performer Protocol. That novel was published in trade paperback, along with the following novel, The Vondish Ambassador. Watt-Evans then moved on to a third Ethshar serial, The Final Calling, which was subsequently published as The Unwelcome Warlock. The Ethshar short stories were first published in various anthologies; later six of them were included as bonus material in Wildside Press's reprints of the Del Rey Ethshar novels.

===== Ethshar novels =====
- The Misenchanted Sword (1985)
- With a Single Spell (1987)
- The Unwilling Warlord (1989)
- The Blood of a Dragon (1991)
- Taking Flight (1993)
- The Spell of the Black Dagger (1993)
- Night of Madness (2000)
- Ithanalin's Restoration (2002)
- The Spriggan Mirror (2006)
- The Vondish Ambassador (2007)
- The Unwelcome Warlock (2010)
- The Sorcerer's Widow (Wildside Press LLC, 2013, ISBN 978-1-4344-4175-1)
- Relics of War: A Legend of Ethshar (Wildside Press LLC, 2014, ISBN 978-1-4794-0464-3)
- Stone Unturned: A Legend of Ethshar (Wildside Press LLC, 2018, ISBN 978-1-4794-3657-6)
- Charming Sharra (Wildside Press LLC, 2023, ISBN 978-1-4794-7476-9)

===== Ethshar short stories =====
- "Portrait of a Hero"
- "The Guardswoman"
- "Sirinita's Dragon"
- "The Bloodstone"
- "Night Flight"
- "Weaving Spells"
- "Ingredients"
- "The God in Red" (chapbook)

==== The Annals of the Chosen trilogy ====
- The Wizard Lord (2006)
- The Ninth Talisman (2007)
- The Summer Palace (2008)

==== The Fall of the Sorcerers series ====
- A Young Man Without Magic (2009)
- Above His Proper Station (2010)

In the Walasian Empire, sorcerers are the aristocracy. They are granted a lot of social power, prestige and wealth, and in return are expected to use their magical abilities for the common good. The system had worked well enough for hundreds of years, and the people in general considered themselves better governed than neighbors with a more conventional aristocracy - but things are starting to change: the economy is in trouble, there is more and more discontent, in the cities people gather and listen to speeches, some of which might be seditious...This is the world into which the protagonist, a young man Anrel Murau, has grown up. His background is a bit unusual. In this society. magical ability is the key to success. While such ability is mostly hereditary, a child of commoners found to have a magical ability is taken into the aristocracy and might attain the highest positions, while a magically deficient child of magical parents - which is unusual but does sometimes happen - is restricted to more humble positions. Anrel Murau is an example of the latter kind. His wizard parents were killed when a spell they worked went wrong. Deeply traumatized by being so orphaned, he thoroughly detests magic and is happy to be declared a non-magical person and live out his life as a simple clerk.

==== Other fantasy novels ====
- The Rebirth of Wonder (1992)
- Split Heirs (in collaboration with Esther Friesner) (1993)
- Touched by the Gods (1997)

=== Science fiction ===
==== The War Surplus series ====
- The Cyborg and the Sorcerers (1982)
- The Wizard and the War Machine (1987)

==== Star Trek novels ====
- Voyager: Ragnarok (as Nathan Archer) (1995)
- Deep Space Nine: Valhalla (as Nathan Archer) (1995)

==== Carlisle Hsing ====
The Carlisle Hsing books are hard-boiled detective mysteries set in a future interstellar civilization dominated by immensely powerful corporations, with the elites being of clearly East Asian - and specifically, Japanese - origin. Nightside City - hometown of the tough female private detective protagonist - is a city devoted to casinos and gambling, which had been shrouded in perpetual night to the inhabitants' content, but is now doomed as the slow rotation of the planet would within a few decades bring it into the Dayside, into the devastating glare and deadly radiation of the nearby sun, making human life there impossible. For inhabitants of Nightside City, "Sunrise" means an impending apocalypse which they must try to escape. But while the city still lives, Carlisle Hsing must earn an uncertain living in a constant fight with crooks, con-men, corrupt business executives and computer programs whose cunning is equal - sometimes superior - to that of humans. Eventually, she is drawn deeply into the private life and the convoluted plots and intrigues in the family of one of the richest and most powerful men in galaxy. With her courage and common-sense, she helps this very important client to neatly solve his problems with his wayward son - but will he allow her to live when she knows so much of his most private secrets?

- Nightside City (1989)
- Realms of Light (2010)

==== Other science fiction novels ====
- The Chromosomal Code (1984)
- Shining Steel (1986)
- Denner's Wreck (1988)
- The Spartacus File (in collaboration with Carl Parlagreco) (2005)
- Spider-Man: Goblin Moon (as Nathan Archer, with Kurt Busiek) (1999)
- Mars Attacks: Martian Deathtrap (as Nathan Archer) (1996)
- Predator:
  - Cold War (as Nathan Archer) (1997)
  - Concrete Jungle (as Nathan Archer) (1995)

=== Horror ===
- The Nightmare People (1990)

=== Short stories ===
Watt-Evans has written more than a hundred short stories, including "Why I Left Harry's All-Night Hamburgers", which won the Hugo Award for Best Short Story in 1988.

==== Collections ====
- Crosstime Traffic (1992)
- Truth, Justice, and the American Way (1992) (collected in Mike Resnick's anthology Alternate Presidents)
- Celestial Debris (2002)

==== Anthologies edited ====
- Newer York (1991)

=== Literary criticism ===
- The Turtle Moves! (Discworld's Story Unauthorized) (2008) - Review of the comic fantasy series by Terry Pratchett
