= Krylov =

Krylov (masculine; Russian: Крылов) and Krylova (feminine; Russian: Крылова) is a Russian surname, derived from the word "крыло́" (wing). Alternative spellings are Krilov, Kryloff, Kriloff (masculine) and Krilova (feminine).

== People ==
- Alexei Krylov (1863–1945), Russian naval engineer and applied mathematician
- Alexander Krylov (born 1969), Soviet academician and scientist in the field of oil deposits development
- Anna Krylov (born 1967), Soviet-born American theoretical chemist
- Andrey Krylov (disambiguation), multiple people, including:
  - Andrey Krylov (swimmer born 1956), Soviet swimmer
  - Andrey Krylov (swimmer born 1984), Russian swimmer
  - Andrey Krylov (gymnast) (born 1988), Russian trampolinist
- Andrei Krylov, Russian guitarist and composer
- Anjelika Krylova (born 1973), Russian ice dancer
- Ivan Krylov (1769–1844), Russian poet and fabulist
- Konstantin Krylov (1967–2020), Russian writer and journalist
- Leonid Krylov (born 1980), Russian canoeist
- Nikita Krylov (born 1992), Russian mixed martial artist
- Nikolay Krylov (disambiguation), multiple people, including:
  - Nikolay Ivanovich Krylov (1903–1972), Soviet marshal
  - Nikolay Mitrofanovich Krylov (1879–1955), Russian mathematician
  - Nikolay Sergeyevich Krylov (1918–1947), Russian physicist
  - Nikolay Vladimirovich Krylov, (born 1941), Russian mathematician
- Pavel Aleksandrovich Krylov (born 1986), Russian footballer
- Porfiry Krylov (botanist) (1850–1931), Soviet botanist
- Porfiry Krylov (painter) (1902-?), Soviet painter and graphic artist
- Sergei Krylov (disambiguation), multiple people, including:
  - Sergei Alexandrovich Krylov (born 1970), Russian violinist
  - Sergei Borisovitch Krylov, Soviet diplomat and ICJ judge
  - Sergei Nikolayevich Krylov (born 1963), Russian auto racing driver
  - Sergei Lvovich Krylov, Russian singer
- Vasily Krylov, Russian biologist
- Victor Krylov, British physicist
- Viktor Krylov (1838–1906), Russian playwright
- Vladimir Krylov, Soviet runner
- Zoya Krylova (1944–2017), Russian journalist and politician

== See also ==
- Krylovsky
