= Lawrence C. Evans =

American mathematician

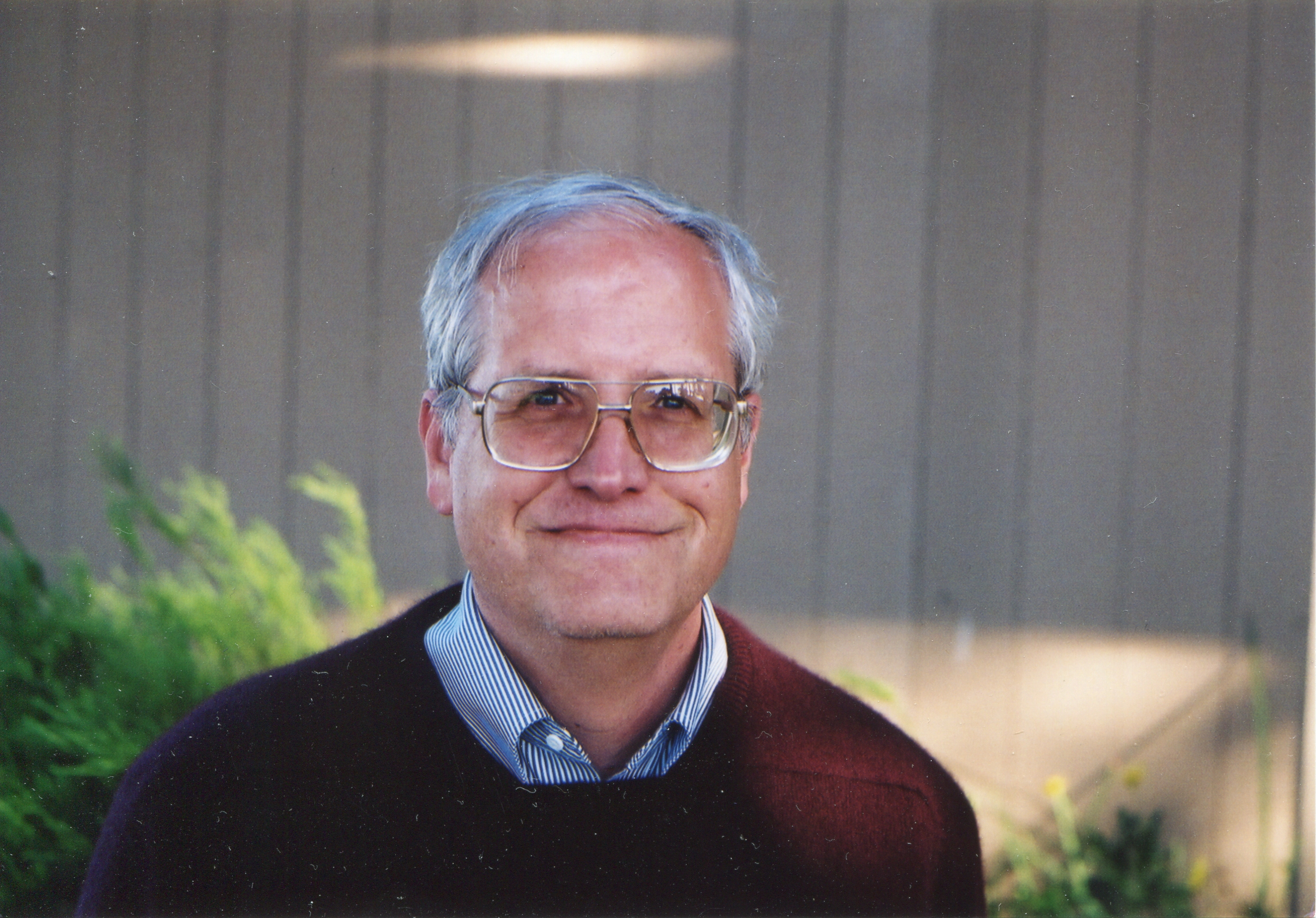
- Lawrence Craig Evans in 2004
- Born: Lawrence Craig Evans; November 1, 1949 (age 76); Atlanta, Georgia
- Title: Class of 1961 Collegium Professor of Mathematics at UC Berkeley
- Awards: National Academy of Sciences inductee, 2014; AMS Fellow, 2013; Steele Prize for Seminal Contribution to Research, 2004; American Academy of Arts and Sciences inductee, 2003

Academic background
- Education: Vanderbilt University (BA)
- Alma mater: UCLA (PhD)
- Thesis: Non linear evolution equations in an arbitrary Banach space (1975)
- Doctoral advisor: Michael G. Crandall

Academic work
- Discipline: Mathematics
- Institutions: UC Berkeley
- Doctoral students: Tom Ilmanen; Suzanne Lenhart
- Website: https://math.berkeley.edu/~evans/

Lawrence Craig Evans (born November 1, 1949) is an American mathematician and Professor of Mathematics at the University of California, Berkeley.

His research is in the field of nonlinear partial differential equations, primarily elliptic equations. In 2004, he shared the Leroy P. Steele Prize for Seminal Contribution to Research with Nicolai V. Krylov for their proofs, found independently, that solutions of concave, fully nonlinear, uniformly elliptic equations are $C^{2,\alpha}$. Evans also made significant contributions to the development of the theory of viscosity solutions of nonlinear equations, to the understanding of the Hamilton–Jacobi–Bellman equation arising in stochastic optimal control theory, and to the theory of harmonic maps. He is also well known as the author of the textbook Partial Differential Equations, which is considered as a standard introduction to the theory at the graduate level. His textbook Measure theory and fine properties of functions (coauthored with Ronald Gariepy), an exposition on Hausdorff measure, capacity, Sobolev functions, and sets of finite perimeter, is also widely cited.

Evans is an ISI highly cited researcher.

== Biography ==
Lawrence Evans was born November 1, 1949, in Atlanta, Georgia. He received a BA from Vanderbilt University in 1971 and a PhD, with thesis advisor Michael G. Crandall, from the University of California, Los Angeles in 1975. From 1975 to 1980, he worked at the University of Kentucky; from 1980 to 1989, at the University of Maryland; and since 1989, at the University of California, Berkeley.

== Awards ==
- 2023 – Steele Prize for Mathematical Exposition
- 2014 – National Academy of Sciences
- 2013 – AMS Fellow
- 2004 – Steele Prize for Seminal Contribution to Research, with Nikolay V. Krylov
- 2003 – American Academy of Arts and Sciences
- 1979 – Sloan Fellow

== Major publications ==
- Evans, Lawrence C. Classical solutions of fully nonlinear, convex, second-order elliptic equations. Comm. Pure Appl. Math. 35 (1982), no. 3, 333–363.
- Crandall, M.G.; Evans, L.C.; Lions, P.-L. Some properties of viscosity solutions of Hamilton-Jacobi equations. Trans. Amer. Math. Soc. 282 (1984), no. 2, 487–502.
- Evans, L.C.; Souganidis, P.E. Differential games and representation formulas for solutions of Hamilton-Jacobi-Isaacs equations. Indiana Univ. Math. J. 33 (1984), no. 5, 773–797.
- Evans, Lawrence C. Quasiconvexity and partial regularity in the calculus of variations. Arch. Rational Mech. Anal. 95 (1986), no. 3, 227–252.
- Evans, Lawrence C. The perturbed test function method for viscosity solutions of nonlinear PDE. Proc. Roy. Soc. Edinburgh Sect. A 111 (1989), no. 3–4, 359–375.
- Evans, Lawrence C. Partial regularity for stationary harmonic maps into spheres. Arch. Rational Mech. Anal. 116 (1991), no. 2, 101–113.
- Evans, L.C.; Spruck, J. Motion of level sets by mean curvature. I. J. Differential Geom. 33 (1991), no. 3, 635–681.
- Evans, Lawrence C. Periodic homogenisation of certain fully nonlinear partial differential equations. Proc. Roy. Soc. Edinburgh Sect. A 120 (1992), no. 3–4, 245–265.
- Evans, L.C.; Soner, H.M.; Souganidis, P.E. Phase transitions and generalized motion by mean curvature. Comm. Pure Appl. Math. 45 (1992), no. 9, 1097–1123.
- Evans, Lawrence C. Partial differential equations and Monge-Kantorovich mass transfer. Current developments in mathematics, 1997 (Cambridge, MA), 65–126, Int. Press, Boston, MA, 1999.
- Crandall, M.G.; Evans, L.C.; Gariepy, R.F. Optimal Lipschitz extensions and the infinity Laplacian. Calc. Var. Partial Differential Equations 13 (2001), no. 2, 123–139.

== Books ==
- Evans, Lawrence C. Weak convergence methods for nonlinear partial differential equations. CBMS Regional Conference Series in Mathematics, 74. Published for the Conference Board of the Mathematical Sciences, Washington, DC; by the American Mathematical Society, Providence, RI, 1990. viii+80 pp. ISBN 0-8218-0724-2
- Evans, L.C.; Gangbo, W. Differential equations methods for the Monge-Kantorovich mass transfer problem. Mem. Amer. Math. Soc. 137 (1999), no. 653, viii+66 pp.
- Calculus of Variations and Non-Linear Partial Differential Equations (with Michael Grain Crandall, Nicola Fusco, Luis Caffarelli, Lawrence C. Evans), Lectures given at the C.I.M.E. Summer School held in Cetraro, Italy, June 27-July 2, 2005, LNM Series No. 1917, Bernard Dacorogna and Paolo Marcellini Editors, Springer-Verlag, Berlin & Heidelberg (DE), 2007. ISBN 978-3-540-75913-3
- Evans, Lawrence C. Partial differential equations. Second edition. Graduate Studies in Mathematics, 19. American Mathematical Society, Providence, RI, 2010. xxii+749 pp. ISBN 978-0-8218-4974-3
- Evans, Lawrence C.; Gariepy, Ronald F. Measure theory and fine properties of functions. Revised edition. Textbooks in Mathematics. CRC Press, Boca Raton, FL, 2015. xiv+299 pp. ISBN 978-1-4822-4238-6
