= Nikolay Krylov =

Nikolay Krylov may refer to:

- Nikolay Krylov (marshal) (1903–1972), Soviet marshal
- Nikolay Krylov (mathematician, born 1879) (1879–1955), Russian mathematician
- Nikolay Krylov (mathematician, born 1941) (born 1941), Russian mathematician
- Nikolay Krylov (physicist) (1917–1947), Russian physicist

== See also ==
- Krylov (disambiguation)
