= Out of This World (Watt-Evans novel) =

1993 novel by Lawrence Watt-Evans

- First edition
- Author: Lawrence Watt-Evans
- Cover artist: Peter Peebles
- Language: English
- Series: The Worlds of Shadow
- Release number: 1
- Genre: Science fantasy
- Publisher: Del Rey Books
- Publication date: 1993
- Publication place: United States
- Media type: Print
- Pages: 394
- ISBN: 0345391144
- Dewey Decimal: 813.54
- Followed by: In the Empire of Shadow

Out of This World (1993) is the first fantasy novel in The Worlds of Shadow trilogy by Lawrence Watt-Evans.

== Plot introduction ==
The premise of the novel is that parallel universes do exist. Some have intelligent non-human life, while others are populated by English-speaking humans. Prior to the events of the novel, one such reality is overrun by a malevolent force known as Shadow. The World of Shadow is a typical high fantasy realm where magic exists and men fight with sword and sorcery. Although pockets of resistance against Shadow exist, their reality has all but been conquered by evil. Another reality, the Galactic Empire, soon finds that they are being invaded by minions who serve Shadow, and declare war. The Galactic Empire is depicted as a science fiction realm of yester-year, akin to Flash Gordon or Buck Rogers. Many planets are colonized by the technologically advanced Empire, and telepaths serve in their military forces. Once the conflict with Shadow began, the Empire uses their telepaths to establish contact with the World of Shadow. The World of Shadow, in turn, use magic to stay in contact with the Galactic Empire. Although both realities share a common enemy, little progress is made in the way of a true alliance due to vast cultural differences. The Empire view the people of Shadow as brute barbarians who could be of no use in a real war, while the people of Shadow consider the Empire and their fascist ways as "possibly the lesser of two evils".

Eight years pass by since initial contact and both sides have all but given up on receiving any true help from the other. Eventually the telepaths of the Empire discover that they have made contact with a third, as-yet-unknown reality, modern-day Earth. Independently, both worlds send diplomatic envoys to Montgomery County, Maryland, where they are either thought to be madmen or filming some sort of movie. A few people, however, do eventually realize that these visitors are telling the truth and are convinced to travel to the World of Shadow, if just to verify their own sanity. Not long after they arrive, Shadow attacks, and the group must flee through a portal to the Galactic Empire to survive. Stranded in another reality with little chance for rescue, this band of strangers from three different realities must put their differences aside and work together if they hope to survive.

== Main characters ==
- Pel Brown - a marketing entrepreneur who lives in Maryland, his family and lawyer are among the group of people from Earth.
- Raven - a former lord of The World of Shadow who now leads a resistance cell in his reality. He first makes contact with Earth's reality by emerging through a magical portal in Pel's basement.
- Captain Cahn - the leader of the expedition from the Galactic Empire, Cahn is a capable leader, who commands the respect and authority of his men.

== Books ==
The Worlds of Shadow series:

- Out of This World (1993)
- In the Empire of Shadow (1995)
- The Reign of the Brown Magician (1996)
