= Moser's trick =

Trick relating differential forms

In differential geometry, a branch of mathematics, Moser's trick (or Moser's argument) is a method to relate two differential forms $\alpha_0$ and $\alpha_1$ on a smooth manifold by a diffeomorphism $\psi \in \mathrm{Diff}(M)$ such that $\psi^* \alpha_1 = \alpha_0$, provided that one can find a family of vector fields satisfying a certain ODE.

More generally, the argument holds for a family $\{ \alpha_t \}_{t \in [0,1]}$ and produce an entire isotopy $\psi_t$ such that $\psi_t^* \alpha_t = \alpha_0$.

It was originally given by Jürgen Moser in 1965 to check when two volume forms are equivalent, but its main applications are in symplectic geometry. It is the standard argument for the modern proof of Darboux's theorem, as well as for the proof of Darboux-Weinstein theorem and other normal form results.

== General statement ==
Let $\{ \omega_t \}_{t \in [0,1]} \subset \Omega^k (M)$ be a family of differential forms on a compact manifold $M$. If the ODE $\frac{d}{dt} \omega_t + \mathcal{L}_{X_t} \omega_t = 0$ admits a solution $\{ X_t \}_{t \in [0,1]} \subset \mathfrak{X}(M)$, then there exists a family $\{ \psi_t \}_{t \in [0,1]}$ of diffeomorphisms of $M$ such that $\psi_t^*\omega_t = \omega_0$ and $\psi_0 = \mathrm{id}_M$. In particular, there is a diffeomorphism $\psi := \psi_1$ such that $\psi^*\omega_1 = \omega_0$.

=== Proof ===
The trick consists in viewing $\{ \psi_t \}_{t \in [0,1]}$ as the flows of a time-dependent vector field, i.e. of a smooth family $\{ X_t \}_{t \in [0,1]}$ of vector fields on $M$. Using the definition of flow, i.e. $\frac{d}{dt} \psi_t = X_t \circ \psi_t$ for every $t \in [0,1]$, one obtains from the chain rule that $\frac{d}{dt} (\psi_t^* \omega_t) = \psi_t^* \Big( \frac{d}{dt} \omega_t + \mathcal{L}_{X_t}\omega_t \Big).$ By hypothesis, one can always find $X_t$ such that $\frac{d}{dt} \omega_t + \mathcal{L}_{X_t} \omega_t = 0$, hence their flows $\psi_t$ satisfies $\psi_t^* \omega_t = \mathrm{const} = \psi_0^* \omega_0 = \omega_0$. In particular, as $M$ is compact, this flows exists at $t = 1$.

== Application to volume forms ==
Let $\alpha_0, \alpha_1$ be two volume forms on a compact $n$-dimensional manifold $M$. Then there exists a diffeomorphism $\psi$ of $M$ such that $\psi^*\alpha_1 = \alpha_0$ if and only if $\int_M \alpha_0 = \int_M \alpha_1$.

=== Proof ===
One implication holds by the invariance of the integral by diffeomorphisms: $\int_M \alpha_0 = \int_M \psi^*\alpha_1 = \int_{\psi(M)} \alpha_1 = \int_M \alpha_1$.

For the converse, we apply Moser's trick to the family of volume forms $\alpha_t := (1-t) \alpha_0 + t \alpha_1$. Since $\int_M (\alpha_1 - \alpha_0) = 0$, the de Rham cohomology class $[\alpha_0 - \alpha_1] \in H^n_{dR}(M)$ vanishes, as a consequence of Poincaré duality and the de Rham theorem. Then $\alpha_1 - \alpha_0 = d\beta$ for some $\beta \in \Omega^{n-1} (M)$, hence $\alpha_t = \alpha_0 + t d\beta$. By Moser's trick, it is enough to solve the following ODE, where we used the Cartan's magic formula, and the fact that $\alpha_t$ is a top-degree form:
$$0 = \frac{d}{dt} \alpha_t + \mathcal{L}_{X_t} \alpha_t = d\beta + d (\iota_{X_t} \alpha_t) + \iota_{X_t} (\cancel{d \alpha_t}) = d (\beta + \iota_{X_t} \alpha_t).$$
However, since $\alpha_t$ is a volume form, i.e. $TM \xrightarrow{\cong} \wedge^{n-1} T^*M, \quad X_t \mapsto \iota_{X_t} \alpha_t$, given $\beta$ one can always find $X_t$ such that $\beta + \iota_{X_t} \alpha_t = 0$.

== Application to symplectic structures ==
In the context of symplectic geometry, the Moser's trick is often presented in the following form.

Let $\{ \omega_t \}_{t \in [0,1]} \subset \Omega^2 (M)$ be a family of symplectic forms on $M$ such that $\frac{d}{dt} \omega_t = d \sigma_t$, for $\{ \sigma_t \}_{t \in [0,1]} \subset \Omega^1 (M)$. Then there exists a family $\{ \psi_t \}_{t \in [0,1]}$ of diffeomorphisms of $M$ such that $\psi_t^*\omega_t = \omega_0$ and $\psi_0 = \mathrm{id}_M$.

=== Proof ===
In order to apply Moser's trick, we need to solve the following ODE

$$0 = \frac{d}{dt} \omega_t + \mathcal{L}_{X_t}\omega_t = d \sigma_t + \iota_{X_t} (\cancel{d\omega_t}) + d (\iota_{X_t} \omega_t) = d (\sigma_t + \iota_{X_t} \omega_t),$$
where we used the hypothesis, the Cartan's magic formula, and the fact that $\omega_t$ is closed. However, since $\omega_t$ is non-degenerate, i.e. $TM \xrightarrow{\cong} T^*M, \quad X_t \mapsto \iota_{X_t} \omega_t$, given $\sigma_t$ one can always find $X_t$ such that $\sigma_t + \iota_{X_t} \omega_t = 0$.

=== Corollary ===
Given two symplectic structures $\omega_0$ and $\omega_1$ on $M$ such that $(\omega_0)_x = (\omega_1)_x$ for some point $x \in M$, there are two neighbourhoods $U_0$ and $U_1$ of $x$ and a diffeomorphism $\phi: U_0 \to U_1$ such that $\phi(x) = x$ and $\phi^*\omega_1 = \omega_0$.

This follows by noticing that, by Poincaré lemma, the difference $\omega_1 - \omega_0$ is locally $d\sigma$ for some $\sigma \in \Omega^1 (M)$; then, shrinking further the neighbourhoods, the result above applied to the family $\omega_t := (1-t) \omega_0 + t \omega_1$ of symplectic structures yields the diffeomorphism $\phi := \psi_1$.

=== Darboux theorem for symplectic structures ===
The Darboux's theorem for symplectic structures states that any point $x$ in a given symplectic manifold $(M,\omega)$ admits a local coordinate chart $(U, x^1,\ldots,x^n,y^1,\ldots,y^n)$ such that
$$\omega|_U = \sum_{i=1}^n dx^i \wedge dy^i.$$
While the original proof by Darboux required a more general statement for 1-forms, Moser's trick provides a straightforward proof. Indeed, choosing any symplectic basis of the symplectic vector space $(T_x M,\omega_x)$, one can always find local coordinates $(\tilde{U}, \tilde{x}^1,\ldots,\tilde{x}^n,\tilde{y}^1,\ldots,\tilde{y}^n)$ such that $\omega_x = \sum_{i=i}^n (d\tilde{x}^i \wedge d\tilde{y}^i) |_x$. Then it is enough to apply the corollary of Moser's trick discussed above to $\omega_0 = \omega |_{\tilde{U}}$ and $\omega_1 = \sum_{i=i}^n d\tilde{x}^i \wedge d\tilde{y}^i$, and consider the new coordinates $x^i = \tilde{x}^i \circ \phi, y^i = \tilde{y}^i \circ \phi$.

== Application: Moser stability theorem ==
Moser himself provided an application of his argument for the stability of symplectic structures, which is known now as Moser stability theorem.

Let $\{ \omega_t \}_{t \in [0,1]} \subset \Omega^2 (M)$ a family of symplectic form on $M$ which are cohomologous, i.e. the deRham cohomology class $[\omega_t] \in H^2_{dR}(M)$ does not depend on $t$. Then there exists a family $\psi_t$ of diffeomorphisms of $M$ such that $\psi^*\omega_t = \omega_0$ and $\psi_0 = \mathrm{id}_M$.

=== Proof ===
It is enough to check that $\frac{d}{dt} \omega_t = d \sigma_t$; then the proof follows from the previous application of Moser's trick to symplectic structures. By the cohomologous hypothesis, $\omega_t - \omega_0$ is an exact form, so that also its derivative $\frac{d}{dt} (\omega_t - \omega_0) = \frac{d}{dt} \omega_t$ is exact for every $t$. The actual proof that this can be done in a smooth way, i.e. that $\frac{d}{dt} \omega_t = d \sigma_t$ for a smooth family of functions $\sigma_t$, requires some algebraic topology. One option is to prove it by induction, using Mayer-Vietoris sequences; another is to choose a Riemannian metric and employ Hodge theory.
