= In the Empire of Shadow =

- First edition
- Author: Lawrence Watt-Evans
- Cover artist: Peter Peebles
- Language: English
- Series: The Worlds of Shadow
- Release number: 2
- Genre: Science fantasy
- Publisher: Del Rey Books
- Publication date: 1995
- Publication place: United States
- Media type: Print
- Pages: 354
- ISBN: 0345372468
- OCLC: 30701205
- Dewey Decimal: 813.54
- Preceded by: Out of This World
- Followed by: The Reign of the Brown Magician

In the Empire of Shadow (1995) is the second fantasy novel in The Worlds of Shadow trilogy by Lawrence Watt-Evans.

== Plot introduction ==
A group from this world is trapped in a science fiction universe. Before the galactic government will send them home, they must agree to travel back to the fantasy universe first, in order to assess the power of the evil wizard who runs the place and any potential risks posed to the galactic empire.

== Books ==
The Worlds of Shadow series:

- Out of This World (1993)
- In the Empire of Shadow (1995)
- The Reign of the Brown Magician (1996)
