= Weinstein's neighbourhood theorem =

In symplectic geometry, a branch of mathematics, Weinstein's neighbourhood theorem refers to a few distinct but related theorems, involving the neighbourhoods of submanifolds in symplectic manifolds and generalising the classical Darboux's theorem. They were proved by Alan Weinstein in 1971.

== Darboux-Moser-Weinstein theorem ==
This statement is a direct generalisation of Darboux's theorem, which is recovered by taking a point as $X$.

Let $M$ be a smooth manifold of dimension $2n$, and $\omega_1$ and $\omega_2$ two symplectic forms on $M$. Consider a compact submanifold $i: X \hookrightarrow M$ such that $i^* \omega_1 = i^* \omega_2$. Then there exist

- two open neighbourhoods $U_1$ and $U_2$ of $X$ in $M$;
- a diffeomorphism $f: U_1 \to U_2$;

such that $f^* \omega_2 = \omega_1$ and $f |_X = \mathrm{id}_X$.

Its proof employs Moser's trick.

=== Generalisation: equivariant Darboux theorem ===
The statement (and the proof) of Darboux-Moser-Weinstein theorem can be generalised in presence of a symplectic action of a Lie group.

Let $M$ be a smooth manifold of dimension $2n$, and $\omega_1$ and $\omega_2$ two symplectic forms on $M$. Let also $G$ be a compact Lie group acting on $M$ and leaving both $\omega_1$ and $\omega_2$ invariant. Consider a compact and $G$-invariant submanifold $i: X \hookrightarrow M$ such that $i^* \omega_1 = i^* \omega_2$. Then there exist

- two open $G$-invariant neighbourhoods $U_1$ and $U_2$ of $X$ in $M$;
- a $G$-equivariant diffeomorphism $f: U_1 \to U_2$;

such that $f^* \omega_2 = \omega_1$ and $f |_X = \mathrm{id}_X$.

In particular, taking again $X$ as a point, one obtains an equivariant version of the classical Darboux theorem.

== Weinstein's Lagrangian neighbourhood theorem ==
Let $M$ be a smooth manifold of dimension $2n$, and $\omega_1$ and $\omega_2$ two symplectic forms on $M$. Consider a compact submanifold $i: L \hookrightarrow M$ of dimension $n$ which is a Lagrangian submanifold of both $(M,\omega_1)$ and $(M, \omega_2)$, i.e. $i^* \omega_1 = i^* \omega_2 = 0$. Then there exist

- two open neighbourhoods $U_1$ and $U_2$ of $L$ in $M$;
- a diffeomorphism $f: U_1 \to U_2$;

such that $f^* \omega_2 = \omega_1$ and $f |_L = \mathrm{id}_L$.

This statement is proved using the Darboux-Moser-Weinstein theorem, taking $X = L$ a Lagrangian submanifold, together with a version of the Whitney Extension Theorem for smooth manifolds.

=== Generalisation: Coisotropic Embedding Theorem ===
Weinstein's result can be generalised by weakening the assumption that $L$ is Lagrangian.

Let $M$ be a smooth manifold of dimension $2n$, and $\omega_1$ and $\omega_2$ two symplectic forms on $M$. Consider a compact submanifold $i: L \hookrightarrow M$ of dimension $k$ which is a coisotropic submanifold of both $(M,\omega_1)$ and $(M, \omega_2)$, and such that $i^* \omega_1 = i^* \omega_2$. Then there exist

- two open neighbourhoods $U_1$ and $U_2$ of $L$ in $M$;
- a diffeomorphism $f: U_1 \to U_2$;

such that $f^* \omega_2 = \omega_1$ and $f |_L = \mathrm{id}_L$.

== Weinstein's tubular neighbourhood theorem ==
While Darboux's theorem identifies locally a symplectic manifold $M$ with $T^*L$, Weinstein's theorem identifies locally a Lagrangian $L$ with the zero section of $T^*L$. More precisely

Let $(M,\omega)$ be a symplectic manifold and $L$ a Lagrangian submanifold. Then there exist

- an open neighbourhood $U$ of $L$ in $M$;
- an open neighbourhood $V$ of the zero section $L_0$ in the cotangent bundle $T^*L$;
- a symplectomorphism $f: U \to V$;

such that $f$ sends $L$ to $L_0$.

=== Proof ===
This statement relies on the Weinstein's Lagrangian neighbourhood theorem, as well as on the standard tubular neighbourhood theorem.
