= The Unwelcome Warlock =

2011 novel by Lawrence Watt-Evans

First edition (publ. Wildside Press)

The Unwelcome Warlock is a fantasy novel by American writer Lawrence Watt-Evans, the eleventh book in the Legends of Ethshar series. It was produced as a serial under the name The Final Calling making it the latest of the four such novels written by Watt-Evans and supported entirely by reader donations. A sequel to Night of Madness, The Unwilling Warlord and The Vondish Ambassador, this book features a number of characters from those previous books. A number of other installments to the Ethshar series are referenced, including The Blood of a Dragon and the as yet unwritten Dumery of the Dragon. The Final Calling was completed on 6 March 2011 and was published by Wildside Press under the title The Unwelcome Warlock in January 2012.
