= The Reign of the Brown Magician =

Novel by Lawrence Watt-Evans

- First edition
- Author: Lawrence Watt-Evans
- Cover artist: Nicholas Jainschigg
- Language: English
- Series: The Worlds of Shadow
- Release number: 3
- Genre: Science fantasy
- Publisher: Del Rey Books
- Publication date: 1996
- Publication place: United States
- Media type: Print
- Pages: 342
- ISBN: 0345372476
- OCLC: 864499939
- Dewey Decimal: 813.54
- Preceded by: In the Empire of Shadow

The Reign of the Brown Magician (1996) is the final fantasy novel in The Worlds of Shadow trilogy by Lawrence Watt-Evans.

== Plot introduction ==
By defeating the powerful wizard who runs a fantasy universe, a man from this world gains all of her powers. He sets about using these powers for the good of the world he is now effectively the ruler of and to fix what went wrong in the previous books.

== Books ==
The Worlds of Shadow series:

- Out of This World (1993)
- In the Empire of Shadow (1995)
- The Reign of the Brown Magician (1996)
