= Inwon Kim =

Korean-American applied mathematician

Inwon Christina Kim is a South Korean and American applied mathematician, and a professor of mathematics at the University of California, Los Angeles.. She specializes in free boundary problems for nonlinear partial differential equations that provide mathematical models of physical and social phenomena including wetting, the spread of cancer, and the motion of crowds.

== Education and career ==
Kim was born in Hawaii, and grew up in South Korea. Despite her family's wishes that she would go into a more practical vocation, she studied mathematics at Seoul National University, graduating in 1997. After a 1999 master's degree in mathematics from the University of Wisconsin–Madison, she completed her Ph.D. in 2002 at the University of Texas at Austin. Her doctoral dissertation, Uniqueness and Existence Results on Viscosity Solutions of Some Free Boundary Problems, was supervised by Panagiotis E. Souganidis.

Next, she became a postdoctoral researcher and C.L.E. Moore Instructor at the Massachusetts Institute of Technology from 2002 to 2005. She joined the UCLA faculty as an assistant professor in 2005, was tenured as an associate professor in 2009, and was promoted to full professor in 2014.

== Recognition ==
Kim was named as a Fellow of the American Mathematical Society, in its 2027 class of fellows.
