= Andrey Krylov =

Andrey Krylov or Andrei Krylov may refer to:

- Andrey Krylov (swimmer born 1956), Soviet swimmer
- Andrey Krylov (swimmer born 1984), Russian swimmer
- Andrey Krylov (gymnast) (born 1988), Russian trampolinist
- Andrei Krylov (composer) (born 1959), Russian guitarist and composer
- Andrei Krylov (mathematician) (born 1956), Russian mathematician
