= Krylovsky =

Krylovsky (Russian: Крыловский; masculine), Krylovskaya (Крыловская; feminine), or Krylovskoye (Крыловское; neuter) is the name of several rural localities in Russia:

- Krylovsky, Bolkhovsky District, Oryol Oblast, a settlement in Yamskoy Selsoviet of Bolkhovsky District of Oryol Oblast
- Krylovsky, Dmitrovsky District, Oryol Oblast, a settlement in Druzhensky Selsoviet of Dmitrovsky District of Oryol Oblast
- Krylovsky, Volgograd Oblast, a khutor in Mirny Selsoviet of Novonikolayevsky District of Volgograd Oblast
- Krylovskaya, Arkhangelsk Oblast, a village in Minsky Selsoviet of Ustyansky District of Arkhangelsk Oblast
- Krylovskaya, Krylovsky District, Krasnodar Krai, a stanitsa in Krylovsky Rural Okrug of Krylovsky District of Krasnodar Krai
- Krylovskaya, Leningradsky District, Krasnodar Krai, a stanitsa in Krylovsky Rural Okrug of Leningradsky District of Krasnodar Krai
- Krylovskaya, Vologda Oblast, a village in Klimushinsky Selsoviet of Verkhovazhsky District of Vologda Oblast
