= The Obsidian Chronicles =

Book series by Lawrence Watt-Evans

The Obsidian Chronicles are a trilogy by Lawrence Watt-Evans. The three books are Dragon Weather (1999), The Dragon Society (2001), and Dragon Venom (2003).

It centers around a boy named Arlian and his quest for vengeance against the dragons that destroyed his hometown and killed his family, and against the man who sold him into slavery, the mysterious and ruthless Lord Dragon. Along the way, Arlian will uncover the secret behind draconic reproduction, and even how to make a god. Eventually, coming face to face with the specific dragon who killed Arlian's beloved grandfather, Arlian discovers that even the dragons are not wantonly evil and that in fact their lot is rather tragic.
