= John William Helton =

- Born: May 2, 1945 (age 81); Jacksonville, Texas
- Education: Stanford University
- Known for: Control theory, Noncommutative geometry, Operator theory, Noncommutative algebra
- Scientific career
- Fields: Mathematics, Engineering, Computer science
- Workplaces: University of California, San Diego
- Doctoral advisor: Michael Grain Crandall

John William "Bill" Helton (Bill Helton) (born 1945) is a professor emeritus of mathematics from the University of California, San Diego. Helton is a Guggenheim Fellow and Fellow of the American Mathematical Society and the Institute of Electrical and Electronics Engineers. He has worked in the fields of operator theory, Hilbert space operators, control theory, algebraic geometry, and noncommutative computer algebra during his career. He organized the first International Workshop on Operator Theory and its Applications which has spawned revolutionary cross-discipline research for over forty years.

== Academic career ==
Bill Helton received the bachelor’s degree in mathematics from the University of Texas at Austin, and the Master’s and Ph.D degree in mathematics from Stanford University. He was at Stony Brook University, as an Assistant and Associate Professor. He visited University of California, Los Angeles for six months and subsequently moved to University of California, San Diego where he became a Full Professor. He was one of the originators of noncommutative geometry. His earlier articles concerned circuit theory, distributed systems, and aspects of the theory of operators on Hilbert space which come from circuits, systems, differential and integral equations, and spectral theory. The theoretical studies of amplifier design by Helton and Youla were the first papers in the now ubiquitous area called H-infinity engineering.

The focus of Helton’s recent work is treating the algebra behind matrix inequalities in a systematic way; this has necessitated development of real algebraic geometry for non-commutative polynomials. His seminal result in this area is the non-commutative version of Hilbert's Nullstellensatz. A related interest is computer algebra and Helton’s research group has been the main provider to Wolfram Mathematica of general non-commutative computer algebra capability.

== Publications ==
Books

- J. William Helton and Charles R. Johnson, Operator Theory, Analytic Functions, Matrices and Electrical Engineering, American Math Society, 1987.
- J. William Helton and Orlando Merino, ""Classical Control Using H-infty Methods", SIAM, 1998.
- J. William Helton and Matt James, "Extending H-infinity Control to Nonlinear Systems", SIAM, Dec. 1999.

Papers

- Over 250 technical papers in various journals over 50 years.
