= The Seven Altars of Dûsarra =

1981 novel by Lawrence Watt-Evans

The Seven Altars of Dûsarra is a novel by Lawrence Watt-Evans published in 1981.

== Plot summary ==
The Seven Altars of Dûsarra is a novel in which Garth searches for the seven altars of the city of Dusarra to destroy them.

== Reception ==
Greg Costikyan reviewed The Seven Altars of Dusarra in Ares Magazine #12 and commented that is "readable, but nothing special".

== Reviews ==
- Review by Andy Sawyer (1987) in "Paperback Inferno", #67
