= The Dragon Society (novel) =

2001 fantasy book by Lawrence Watt-Evans

- First edition (publ. Tor Books), cover art by Bob Eggleton
- Author: Lawrence Watt-Evans
- Series: The Obsidian Chronicles
- Publisher: Tor Books
- Publication date: December 1, 2001
- ISBN: 0-765-30007-9
- Preceded by: Dragon Weather (1999)
- Followed by: Dragon Venom (2003)

The Dragon Society (2001) is the second fantasy novel of The Obsidian Chronicles, a trilogy by Lawrence Watt-Evans.

== Plot introduction ==
After the events of the first book, Dragon Weather, Arlian finds himself armed with the knowledge of how dragons reproduce. It is a nasty and terrible business and Arlian wishes to prevent dragons from ever reproducing. Using the magic gathered in Arithei, he continues his quest. He realizes that if he is to fulfill his quest of destroying the dragons he must destroy the entire dragon society which is made up of dragon hearts. Dragon hearts are those who have drunk a mixture of human blood and dragon venom and gain a long extended life and a baby dragon growing in their heart; ironically, Arlian is himself such a dragon heart, and he to would give birth to a dragon in a thousand years unless he does something to prevent that. Arlian and his best friend Black hunt down the dragons in the hope that if Arlian kills a dragon the duke will assist him in destroying the dragon menace. In the end he removes a dragon from the heart of a Lady Rime which wakes up its mother - as it turns out, dragons care for their offspring as much as do humans and other creatures. The mother dragon comes to Manfort to kill Arlian but instead falls victim to an obsidian spear. This success is achieved only thanks to a change of heart by one of Arlian's most staunch foes - who, at the crucial moment becomes a loyal and courageous ally, sacrificing his own life in order to enable Arlian to overcome the dragon. Shaken and deeply moved, Arlian decides to give up any further design of revenge on human enemies, concentrating on the campaign against the dragons. Arlian is the first man ever to kill a dragon, and his standing and prestige mounts high. He receives the full assistance of the duke and is named warlord in the coming battle against the dragons. Even with the initial success of killing a dragon, Arlian's task is far from over.
