= The Annals of the Chosen =

Fantasy book trilogy

- The Wizard Lord (2006); The Ninth Talisman (2007); The Summer Palace (2008)
- Author: Lawrence Watt-Evans
- Genre: Fantasy
- Publisher: Tor
- No. of books: 3

The Annals of the Chosen is a trilogy by Lawrence Watt-Evans consisting of the following books: The Wizard Lord (2006), The Ninth Talisman (2007), and The Summer Palace (2008).

== Background ==
The trilogy is set in the world of Barokan. All magic in Barokan is based on ler, divided into two types. Ler of the first type are linked to a specific object. There are ler of plants, places, animals, and things. Priests negotiate with these ler so that people can live in peace with them. Some ler can be very demanding. The second type of ler are not linked to any specific place and can be more abstract in nature. Wizardry is related to these ler, but unlike priests, wizards do not negotiate. They control these ler by binding them to talismans.

Barokan is ruled by a powerful wizard called the Wizard Lord. A group of wizards called the Council of Immortals select the Wizard Lord, who then reigns until death or he chooses to resign. The source of the Wizard Lord's power is a collection of talismans, given to him by the Council of Immortals, that make him much more powerful than the other wizards. The Wizard Lord is responsible for dealing with any wizard that goes rogue and attacks the general population. He also provides some public services like weather control.

Since the Wizard Lord's talismans make him extremely powerful, a problem occurs if the Wizard Lord himself goes rogue. Even combined, the other wizards would have great difficulty in dealing with him. When a Wizard Lord goes rogue, he is referred to as a Dark Lord.

When the first Dark Lord occurred, the surviving wizards created the Chosen to deal with the problem. The Chosen are just ordinary people who have taken an oath to deal with any Dark Lord that occurs. Although the Council of Immortals may request that they remove a Wizard Lord, the Chosen have the final authority to declare that a Wizard Lord has become a Dark Lord and may make the decision even if not asked by the Council of Immortals.

In addition to enhanced immunity to magic that each member has, the Chosen have two major advantages to help counter the Wizard Lord's power. First, each member has specialised magic that is designed to help with some aspect of a mission to kill a Dark Lord. Second, the talismans that give the Dark Lord his enhanced power only function if the corresponding member of the Chosen is alive. This means each time he kills one of the Chosen, he loses some aspect of his power and if they are all killed, all of his talismans lose their power and the Council of Immortals can easily deal with him. The Chosen are also mostly immune to each other's magic.

== The Chosen ==
=== The Leader ===
Magical abilities:

- Persuasion: Can convince people to do things they don't want and when he speaks, all in earshot have no choice but to listen
- Planning: Can make plans quickly and they have a disproportionally large chance of working

Curse:

- Must convince one person (or thing if no people are available) to do something they wouldn't have done, once a day

Talisman: Crown

Linked talisman: Glory

- Increases the Wizard Lord's aura of authority, making him difficult to disobey

=== The Swordsman ===
Magical abilities:

- Swordsmanship: Has enhanced skill with a sword or any swordlike weapon, so that he is the greatest swordsman in Barokan. It will always win a fair duel with anyone.

Curse:

- Must practice his swordsmanship for an hour a day

Talisman: Small Sword

Linked talisman: Strength

- Increases the Wizard Lord's physical strength and endurance

=== The Archer ===
Magical abilities:

- Stealth: Can greatly reduce the chances of people noticing that he is there.
- Bowmanship: Enhanced skill with a bow, so that he is the greatest archer in Barokan.

Curse:

- Must hit 12 difficult targets per day

Talisman: Golden Arrow

Linked talisman: Weather

- Grants weather control

=== The Seer ===
Magical abilities:

- Location: Knows where the Wizard Lord and the members of the Chosen are at all times (Chosen can be shielded)
- Insight: Sometimes just knows important facts

Curse:

- Must meditate for 1 hour each night to listen to the ler

Talisman: Glass Orb

Linked talisman: Warding

- Allows the Wizard Lord to determine the location of the Chosen (can be shielded)

=== The Speaker ===
Magical abilities:

- Tongues: Can speak and understand all languages, including ler's

Curse:

- Must listen to all voices around her

Talisman: Small Tongue

Linked talisman: Names

- Allows the Wizard Lord to determine the true name of every person and animal. Knowing its true name allows him to control any animal.

=== The Beauty ===
Magical abilities:

- Beauty is physically the most beautiful woman in Barokan and this is then enhanced further by magic
- Healing: Has the healing ability of a strong priest

Curse:

- Cannot conceive
- Cannot switch off her magical beauty enhancements (which would make her just the most beautiful woman in Baroken)

Talisman: Silver Mirror

Linked talisman: Health

- ??? (Unknown)

=== The Thief ===
Magical abilities:

- Stealing: Enhanced ability to steal
- Lock-picking: Can open nearly any lock

Curse:

- 3 times a day, open a lock without a key or steal something (but can give it back later)

Talisman: Iron Key

Linked talisman: Crafts

- ??? (Unknown)

=== The Scholar ===
Magical abilities:

- Lore: Will remember anything he is ever told, but only if it is true. He is a store of accurate knowledge.

Curse:

- Must learn one new fact every day.

Talisman: Open Book

Linked talisman: Memory

- Allows the Wizard Lord to remember any true name he ever knew. Even without the Seer's linked talisman, it allows him control animals whose name he previously determined.

=== The Traitor ===
The role was created after the slaying of the Dark Lord of the Galbek Hills, after the events in The Wizard Lord.

This is a secret role that none (not even other chosen) are supposed to know of.

Magical abilities:

- Secret: Prevents others (even the Council of Immortals) from revealing and identifying the Chosen Traitor.
- Entrustment: The Wizard lord completely trusts the Chosen Traitor.

Curse:

- The Chosen Traitor has the Wizard Lord's complete trust, but can not control the Wizard Lord's action or thoughts.
- The Chosen Traitor can not kill the Wizard Lord when acting alone. Chosen Traitor can only kill the Wizard Lord in the presence of other Chosen, and even then, the Wizard Lord must be under attack from the other Chosen.

Talisman: Coin

Linked talisman: Trust

- Prevents the Wizard Lord from mistrusting the Chosen Traitor. No matter what anyone says, what the Chosen Traitor has done, or is currently doing, the Wizard Lord will not believe that the Chosen Traitor is capable of betraying him.

== Books ==
The Annals of the Chosen trilogy:

- The Wizard Lord (2006)
- The Ninth Talisman (2007)
- The Summer Palace (2008)
