= Krylov (disambiguation) =

Krylov is a Russian surname.

Krylov may also refer to:

- Krylov (crater), a lunar crater
- Krylov Peninsula, an Antarctic peninsula
- Krylov State Research Center, a state-owned shipbuilding research institute
- 5247 Krylov, an asteroid
- a Krylov subspace
- the Krylov-Bogolyubov theorem
- Krylov FA-37 Assault Rifle, a fictitious weapon in Battlefield 2142
- former name of Novogeorgievsk
