= Michael G. Crandall =

American mathematician

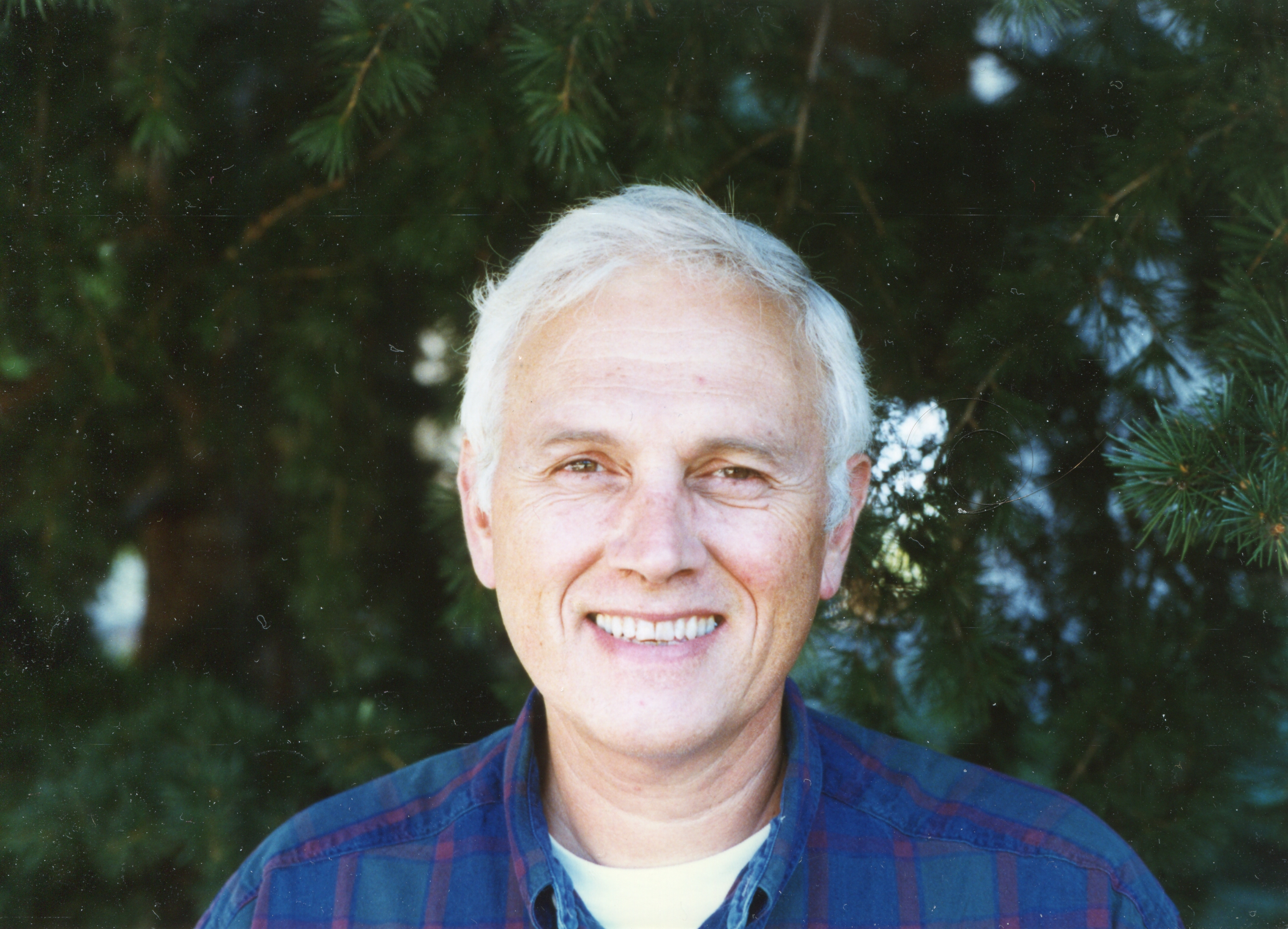
- Born: November 29, 1940; Baton Rouge, Louisiana, U.S.
- Died: March 21, 2026 (aged 85)
- Occupation: Mathematics Professor (Emeritus)
- Scientific career
- Education: UC Berkeley
- Awards: Leroy P. Steele Prize (1999)
- Workplaces: University of California, Santa Barbara
- Doctoral students: Lawrence Evans; P. E. Souganidis; John William Helton

Michael Grain Crandall (November 29, 1940 – March 21, 2026) was an American mathematician who specialized in differential equations.

== Mathematical career ==
In 1962 Crandall earned a baccalaureate in engineering physics from University of California, Berkeley, changed to mathematics, earning a master's in 1964 and a PhD in 1965 under Heinz Cordes at Berkeley, with a thesis that solved a problem in celestial mechanics posed by Carl Ludwig Siegel; the thesis title is Two families of plane solutions of the four body problem. In 1965 he was an instructor at Berkeley, in 1966 an assistant professor at Stanford University and from 1969 at the University of California, Los Angeles (UCLA), where he was a professor from 1973 to 1976. From 1974 to 1984 he was a professor at the Mathematics Research Center at the University of Wisconsin–Madison, from 1984 to 1990 as Hille-Professor of Mathematics. From 1988 until his retirement he was a professor at the University of California, Santa Barbara. Crandall was several times a visiting professor at the University of Paris, where he received an honorary doctorate in 1999.

Crandall worked primarily on partial differential equations, e.g., with bifurcation theory, evolution equations, generation of semigroups of transformations on Banach spaces and the theory of Hamilton–Jacobi equations. With Pierre-Louis Lions he did research on the viscosity solutions of partial differential equations.

In 2000 he was elected a member of the American Academy of Arts and Sciences. In 1999 he received the Leroy P. Steele Prize. In 1974 he was an Invited Lecturer (on "Semigroups of nonlinear equations and evolution equations") at the International Congress of Mathematicians in Vancouver. In 2012 he became a fellow of the American Mathematical Society. In 2023, he was elected to the National Academy of Sciences.

Among his doctoral students are Lawrence C. Evans and Panagiotis E. Souganidis.
