= Sergei Krylov =

Sergei Krylov may refer to:

- Sergei Krylov (violinist) (born 1970), Russian violinist
- Presence (Marvel Comics), a fictional character in the Marvel Comics Universe with the real name Sergei Krylov
- Sergei Krylov (judge), Soviet diplomat and ICJ judge
- Sergey Krylov (racing driver) (born 1963), Russian auto racing driver
- Sergei Krylov (singer), Russian singer
