= Dragon Venom =

2003 novel by Lawrence Watt-Evans

- First edition cover (publ. Tor Books), cover art by Bob Eggleton
- Author: Lawrence Watt-Evans
- Series: The Obsidian Chronicles
- Publisher: Tor Books
- Publication date: September 28, 2003
- ISBN: 978-0-765-30279-3
- Preceded by: The Dragon Society

Dragon Venom (2003) is the third and the final fantasy novel of The Obsidian Chronicles, a trilogy by American speculative fiction writer Lawrence Watt-Evans.

== Plot introduction ==
Arlian has discovered how to kill the dragons; he now faces an all-out war between dragons and humans. The Dragon Society is split between those loyal to the dragons and those loyal to themselves. Arlian's quest for vengeance will find many secrets of the past, including the origins of the dragon's greatest foes: the gods. The secret is quite simple, though the dragons have kept it secret for thousands of years: when a human being – male or female – is injected with dragon venom, he or she becomes a dragonheart (a human carrying a baby dragon), lives for a thousand years and then gives birth to the dragon. If a dragon venom is given to a pregnant woman, then her child will become a god - the one kind of being who can defeat and dominate the dragons. Thousands of years ago, the dragons succeeded in killing the gods who dominated them. Now, Arlian has given dragon venom to his steward's wife who is carrying a child - and her baby becomes a god, bringing back the dragons' most dreaded enemy.

The dragons attack the city, seeking to destroy the newborn god. To protect the baby god, Arlian battles the dragons - killing the three dragons who killed his family and turned him into a dragon heart. During the final confrontation with the dragon who killed Arlian's beloved grandfather - the being which Arlian hated most deeply of all those on whom he sought revenge - Arlian hears for the first time the dragons' own account of themselves, and learns that they are not wantonly murderous and destructive, though it seems so to humans. In fact, the dragons' lot turns out to be quite tragic, and Arlian had done quite a bit to make it more tragic.

In this final struggle with these dragons Arlian becomes badly injured by dragon venom (the only substance that can harm a dragonheart) so mages cut open his heart and remove the dragon within him. He then awakens to find the young god has healed him and at long last ends his quest for vengeance. The specific dragons who killed Arlian's family are dead, and he gives up his quest for revenge on dragons in general and his aim of completely exterminating them. At the end of the story Arlian is joined by his closest friends and for the first time in a long time feels the emotion of love, and is no longer driven by a passion for revenge. He, however, keeps hidden the one weapon which can kill a god, in case it might be once needed.
