= The Cyborg and the Sorcerers =

1982 novel by Lawrence Watt-Evans

- Author: Lawrence Watt-Evans
- Cover artist: David B. Mattingly
- Language: English
- Series: War Surplus
- Genre: Science Fiction
- Publisher: Del Ray
- Publication date: June 1982
- Publication place: United States
- ISBN: 0-345-30441-1
- Followed by: The Wizard and the War Machine
- Website: The Cyborg and the Sorcerers

The Cyborg and the Sorcerers is a science fiction novel by Lawrence Watt-Evans. Published in June 1982, it was Evans' first science fiction novel, although preceded by several fantasy works. The book blends elements of hard science fiction with fantasy.

A war-weary cyborg spy is sent on a mission to the planet Dest where anomalous gravity events convince the artificial intelligence of his spaceship that they are a form of weapons research. Instead, he finds the natives refer to this simply as "magic". The AI refuses to believe any peaceful intent and eventually begins a mission to destroy the civilization.

Watt-Evans revisited Dest in a 1987 sequel, The Wizard and the War Machine.

== Plot ==
"Slant" is the primary member of several constructed personalities in a reconstructed cyborg body. He is a member of the Independent Reconnaissance Unit (IRU), agents created by the Earth military during an interstellar war with her former colonies. During the war, the Earth is bombed and military command on Mars goes silent; radio chatter with other IRU ships makes it clear the war was lost. Fourteen years have passed on board his ship, but as it is traveling near light speed for much of this time, around 300 years have passed in realtime. Although the war is long over, Slant's shipboard AI refuses to acknowledge this and continues to send him on missions. Slant is compelled to carry them out through the threat of a small explosive surgically implanted at the base of his skull. He now lives most of his life in the ship's acceleration couch, connected to the AI via a data connector on the back of his neck.

The action begins when the ship enters a system last listed as having been the target of an attack but with no record of the outcome. They find the main planet bombed to oblivion, but a second smaller planet, Dest, is only partially destroyed and shows signs of a simple medieval-era society. The instruments also discover odd readings of variable gravity, which the ship immediately surmises are antigravity weapons research and sends Slant to discover the source. He travels to the city of Teyzha where he is briefly interrogated by a group of wizards. He learns that magic is an accepted reality, and soon discovers this is the cause of the gravitational oddities. He later infiltrates a library but all the books assume the reader understands the basics of the craft. Slant is captured and the ship comes to rescue him, destroying much of the city in the process.

Slant infiltrates another city, Awlmei. He hires a wizard who explains that the required "wizard sight" can be given to anyone by re-arranging the brain's connections. On hearing this, the ship orders Slant to kill him and retrieve his brain for study. He returns to the ship but is followed by several wizards who drain the ship's energy. As the ship "dies", a recording plays from Mars command that tells him a distress signal has been sent and instructs him to go into hiding to await rescue. It also reveals that he can override the ship's AI by repeating his original civilian name three times.

Slant travels to the city of Praunce with the goal of having their wizards remove the bomb from his neck just to be sure. Praunce turns out to be built on the ruins of a bombed pre-war city and he visits a wizard who lives at the top of a surviving skyscraper. As the wizard confers with his colleagues, the ship reestablishes contact and explains that it had repowered itself using solar panels. When Slant goes to feed their horses, communications with the ship is cut as he drops below the radio horizon, and when he returns to the upper levels the ship reestablishes control. The wizards realize what is going on and attempt to create several subterfuges to get him to return below, but the computer refuses to allow communications to be cut, and orders Slant to kill them all. He refuses, and considering him to be turned, the AI triggers the bomb.

He awakes some time later. Having understood the basics of his story, the wizards attempted to remove the explosive and had managed to move it a short distance away when it triggered. In the meantime, assuming he is dead, the ship plans its final mission to attack the cities with its store of small atomic bombs and then self-destruct. While he recuperates, the wizards fly Slant to the ship and he boards just before it takes off. The AI is unable to comprehend his presence and refuses commands. He had recalled his name once and written it in a book, and he begins frantically tearing through his library to find it but suddenly recalls it, Samuel Turner, at which point the computer shuts down.

To regain control of the ship, he attempts to reconnect the data cable but the bomb has destroyed the socket. Looking at the cable in dismay, he sees a vague image of the control interface and manages to slow the ship to a crash landing. After he exits the ship the wizards explain that they gave him wizard sight and are happy to see he was able to use it without training. He leaves for the city of Praunce to take up an apprenticeship in wizardry.

== Reception ==
In a pre-release review, Watt-Evans expressed that "fantasy is the most unlimited of all (literary) fields" as one could write on literally any topic, whereas with science fiction there were some limits imposed. In contrast, he said that The Cyborg and the Sorcerers had to remain limited to the laws of physics, which is why the spaceships in the book travel slower than the speed of light. For some details he relied on his wife Julie, a chemist, to provide some basis in reality.

The Cyborg and the Sorcerers was well-reviewed when it was released. Greg Bailey wrote a syndicated review that concluded that it was a "well-written and exciting book. It ranks with the best in recent science [and] fantasy". Although decades old, the book still garners favorable reviews today.
