= István Gyöngy =

Hungarian mathematician

- Born: 1951 (age 74–75); Budapest, Hungary
- Citizenship: Hungarian
- Education: Moscow State University
- Scientific career
- Fields: Mathematics
- Workplaces: University of Edinburgh
- Doctoral advisor: Nicolai V. Krylov

István Gyöngy (born 1951) is a Hungarian mathematician working in the fields of stochastic differential equations, stochastic partial differential equations and their applications to nonlinear filtering and stochastic control. Recently, he has focused his attention on numerical analysis and especially accelerated numerical methods, making use of Richardson extrapolation.

He obtained his Candidate degree at Moscow State University in 1981 under the supervision of Nicolai V. Krylov.

Formerly at the Department of Probability Theory and Statistics of the Eötvös Loránd University of Budapest, he is currently a professor at the University of Edinburgh, where he is head of the Probability and Stochastic Analysis research group.
