= Thaleia Zariphopoulou =

Greek-American mathematician

Thaleia Zariphopoulou (born 1962) is a Greek-American mathematician specializing in mathematical finance. She is the chair in Mathematics and the V. H. Neuhaus Centennial Professor of Finance at the University of Texas at Austin.

Zariphopoulou earned a B.S. in electrical engineering from the National Technical University of Athens in 1984. She then went to Brown University for graduate studies in applied mathematics and earned her master's degree in 1985 and her Ph.D. degree in 1989 under the supervision of Wendell Fleming. She was an assistant professor at Worcester Polytechnic Institute and an associate professor at the University of Wisconsin–Madison, before she moved to the University of Texas at Austin in 1999. She was the first holder of the Man Chair of Quantitative Finance at the Oxford-Man Institute from 2009 to 2012.

In 2012 she became a fellow of the Society for Industrial and Applied Mathematics "for contributions to stochastic control and financial mathematics". She was an invited speaker at the 2014 International Congress of Mathematicians, and at the conference Dynamics, Equations and Applications in Kraków in 2019.

Her husband is Panagiotis E. Souganidis, the Charles H. Swift Distinguished Service Professor in Mathematics at the University of Chicago.
