= Why I Left Harry's All-Night Hamburgers =

- Short story by Lawrence Watt-Evans
- Country: United States
- Language: English
- Genre(s): Science fiction short story

Publication
- Publication date: 1987

"Why I Left Harry's All-Night Hamburgers" is a science fiction short story by Lawrence Watt-Evans. It was first published in Asimov's Science Fiction.

== Plot summary ==
A young man tells his story about growing up working at a greasy spoon diner near Sutton, West Virginia. Late at night it happened to be a hang-out for unusual travelers from alternate versions of Earth. After being tantalized by descriptions of far-off wonders, the young man begins to dream of hitching a ride in one of the "travelers'" vehicles.

== Reception and adaptation ==
"Harry's" won the 1988 Hugo Award for Best Short Story, and was nominated for the Nebula Award for Best Short Story in 1987. Since 2019, the short story was in development by Warner Brothers for a film release.

== Sequels ==
Watt-Evans has published three sequels to the story: "A Flying Saucer with Minnesota Plates" (1991), "Harry's Toaster" (2018), and "How I Found Harry's All-Night Hamburgers" (2019).
