= Time dependent vector field =

Vector calculus construction

In mathematics, a time dependent vector field is a construction in vector calculus which generalizes the concept of vector fields. It can be thought of as a vector field which moves as time passes. For every instant of time, it associates a vector to every point in a Euclidean space or in a manifold.

== Definition ==
A time dependent vector field on a manifold M is a map from an open subset $\Omega \subset \mathbb{R} \times M$ on $TM$

$$\begin{align}
X: \Omega \subset \mathbb{R} \times M &\longrightarrow TM \\
(t,x) &\longmapsto X(t,x) = X_t(x) \in T_xM
\end{align}$$

such that for every $(t,x) \in \Omega$, $X_t(x)$ is an element of $T_xM$.

For every $t \in \mathbb{R}$ such that the set

$$\Omega_t=\{x \in M \mid (t,x) \in \Omega \} \subset M$$

is nonempty, $X_t$ is a vector field in the usual sense defined on the open set $\Omega_t \subset M$.

== Associated differential equation ==
Given a time dependent vector field X on a manifold M, we can associate to it the following differential equation:

$$\frac{dx}{dt}=X(t,x)$$

which is called nonautonomous by definition.

== Integral curve ==
An integral curve of the equation above (also called an integral curve of X) is a map

$$\alpha : I \subset \mathbb{R} \longrightarrow M$$

such that $\forall t_0 \in I$, $(t_0,\alpha (t_0))$ is an element of the domain of definition of X and

$$\frac{d \alpha}{dt} \left.{\!\!\frac{}{}}\right|_{t=t_0} =X(t_0,\alpha (t_0))$$.

== Equivalence with time-independent vector fields ==
A time dependent vector field $X$ on $M$ can be thought of as a vector field $\tilde{X}$ on $\mathbb{R} \times M,$ where $\tilde{X}(t,p) \in T_{(t,p)}(\mathbb{R} \times M)$ does not depend on $t.$

Conversely, associated with a time-dependent vector field $X$ on $M$ is a time-independent one $\tilde{X}$

$$\mathbb{R} \times M \ni (t,p) \mapsto \dfrac{\partial}{\partial t}\Biggl|_t + X(p) \in T_{(t,p)}(\mathbb{R} \times M)$$

on $\mathbb{R} \times M.$ In coordinates,

$$\tilde{X}(t,x)=(1,X(t,x)).$$

The system of autonomous differential equations for $\tilde{X}$ is equivalent to that of non-autonomous ones for $X,$ and $x_t \leftrightarrow (t,x_t)$ is a bijection between the sets of integral curves of $X$ and $\tilde{X},$ respectively.

== Flow ==
The flow of a time dependent vector field X, is the unique differentiable map

$$F:D(X) \subset \mathbb{R} \times \Omega \longrightarrow M$$

such that for every $(t_0,x) \in \Omega$,

$$t \longrightarrow F(t,t_0,x)$$

is the integral curve $\alpha$ of X that satisfies $\alpha (t_0) = x$.

=== Properties ===
We define $F_{t,s}$ as $F_{t,s}(p)=F(t,s,p)$

1. If $(t_1,t_0,p) \in D(X)$ and $(t_2,t_1,F_{t_1,t_0}(p)) \in D(X)$ then $F_{t_2,t_1} \circ F_{t_1,t_0}(p)=F_{t_2,t_0}(p)$
2. $\forall t,s$, $F_{t,s}$ is a diffeomorphism with inverse $F_{s,t}$.

== Applications ==
Let X and Y be smooth time dependent vector fields and $F$ the flow of X. The following identity can be proved:

$$\frac{d}{dt} \left .{\!\!\frac{}{}}\right|_{t=t_1} (F^*_{t,t_0} Y_t)_p = \left( F^*_{t_1,t_0} \left( [X_{t_1},Y_{t_1}] + \frac{d}{dt} \left .{\!\!\frac{}{}}\right|_{t=t_1} Y_t \right) \right)_p$$

Also, we can define time dependent tensor fields in an analogous way, and prove this similar identity, assuming that $\eta$ is a smooth time dependent tensor field:

$$\frac{d}{dt} \left .{\!\!\frac{}{}}\right|_{t=t_1} (F^*_{t,t_0} \eta_t)_p = \left( F^*_{t_1,t_0} \left( \mathcal{L}_{X_{t_1}}\eta_{t_1} + \frac{d}{dt} \left .{\!\!\frac{}{}}\right|_{t=t_1} \eta_t \right) \right)_p$$

This last identity is useful to prove the Darboux theorem.
