= Pavel Krylov =

Russian footballer

Personal information
- Full name: Pavel Aleksandrovich Krylov
- Date of birth: 27 August 1986 (age 40)
- Place of birth: Moscow, Russian SFSR
- Height: 1.84 m (6 ft 1/2 in)
- Position: Defender

Youth career
- 1996–: Krasny Oktyabr Moscow
- FC Nika Moscow
- FC Spartak Moscow

Senior career*
Years	Team	Apps	(Gls)
2004	FC Shinnik Yaroslavl	0	(0)
2005	FC Nara-Desna Naro-Fominsk	22	(1)
2006	FC Zvezda Serpukhov	26	(0)
2007	FC Boyevoye Bratsvo Krasnoarmeysk		
2007–2008	FC Spartak Shchyolkovo	21	(0)
2008	FC Nara-ShBFR Naro-Fominsk	12	(0)
2009	FC Zorky Krasnogorsk (amateur)		
2010	FC Nara-ShBFR Naro-Fominsk	15	(1)
2010	FC Prialit Reutov		
2011	FC Sheksna Cherepovets	14	(1)
2012	FC Oka Stupino (amateur)		
2012	FC Zorky Krasnogorsk (amateur)		
2013–2014	FC Kolomna	21	(2)
2014	FC StArs Kolomensky Rayon		
2015	FC CFKiS Lobnya (amateur)		
- * Club domestic league appearances and goals

Pavel Aleksandrovich Krylov (Russian: Павел Александрович Крылов; born 27 August 1986) is a former Russian professional footballer.

== Club career ==
He made his debut for FC Shinnik Yaroslavl on 3 July 2004 in an Intertoto Cup game against FK Teplice. He also appeared in the return leg against Teplice.
