= Nicola Fusco =

Italian mathematician

- Born: 14 August 1956 (age 70); Naples, Italy
- Education: University of Naples Federico II
- Known for: Calculus of variations, Regularity theory, Symmetrization theory
- Awards: Caccioppoli Prize (1994)
- Scientific career
- Fields: Calculus of variations, Partial differential equations
- Workplaces: University of Naples Federico II, University of Florence
- Doctoral advisor: Carlo Sbordone
- Doctoral students: Giuseppe Mingione

Nicola Fusco (born 14 August 1956) is an Italian mathematician mainly known for his contributions to the fields of calculus of variations, regularity theory of partial differential equations, and the theory of symmetrization. He is currently professor at the University of Naples Federico II. Fusco also taught and conducted research at the Australian National University at Canberra, the Carnegie Mellon University at Pittsburgh and at the University of Florence.

He is the Managing Editor of the scientific journal Advances in Calculus of Variations, and member of the editorial boards of various scientific journals.

== Awards ==
Fusco won the 1994 edition of the Caccioppoli Prize of the Italian Mathematical Union, and, in 2010, the Tartufari Prize from the Accademia Nazionale dei Lincei. In 2008 he was an invited speaker at European Congress of Mathematics and in 2010 he was invited speaker at the International Congress of Mathematicians on the topic of "Partial Differential Equations."

From 2010 he is a corresponding member of Accademia Nazionale dei Lincei.

== Selected publications ==
- Acerbi, E.; Fusco, N. "Semicontinuity problems in the Calculus of Variations" Archive for Rational Mechanics and Analysis 86 (1984)
- Haïm Brezis; Fusco, N.; Sbordone, C. "Integrability for the Jacobian of orientation preserving mappings" Journal of Functional Analysis 115 (1993)
- Fusco, N.; Pierre-Louis Lions; Sbordone, C. "Sobolev imbedding theorems in borderline cases" Proceedings of the American Mathematical Society 124 (1996)
- Luigi Ambrosio, L.; Fusco, N.; Pallara, D. "Partial regularity of free discontinuity sets" Annali della Scuola Normale Superiore di Pisa Classe di Scienze (2) 24 (1997)
- Ambrosio, L.; Fusco, N.; Pallara, D. Functions of bounded variation and free discontinuity problems. Oxford Mathematical Monographs. The Clarendon Press, Oxford University Press, New York (2000)
- Irene Fonseca; Fusco, N.; Paolo Marcellini; "On the total variation of the Jacobian" Journal of Functional Analysis 207 (2004)
- Chlebik, M.; Cianchi, A.; Fusco, N. "The perimeter inequality under Steiner symmetrization: cases of equality" Annals of Mathematics (2) 162 (2005)
- Fusco, N.; Maggi, F.; Pratelli, A. "The sharp quantitative isoperimetric inequality" Annals of Mathematics (2) 168 (2008)
