= Paolo Marcellini =

Italian mathematician

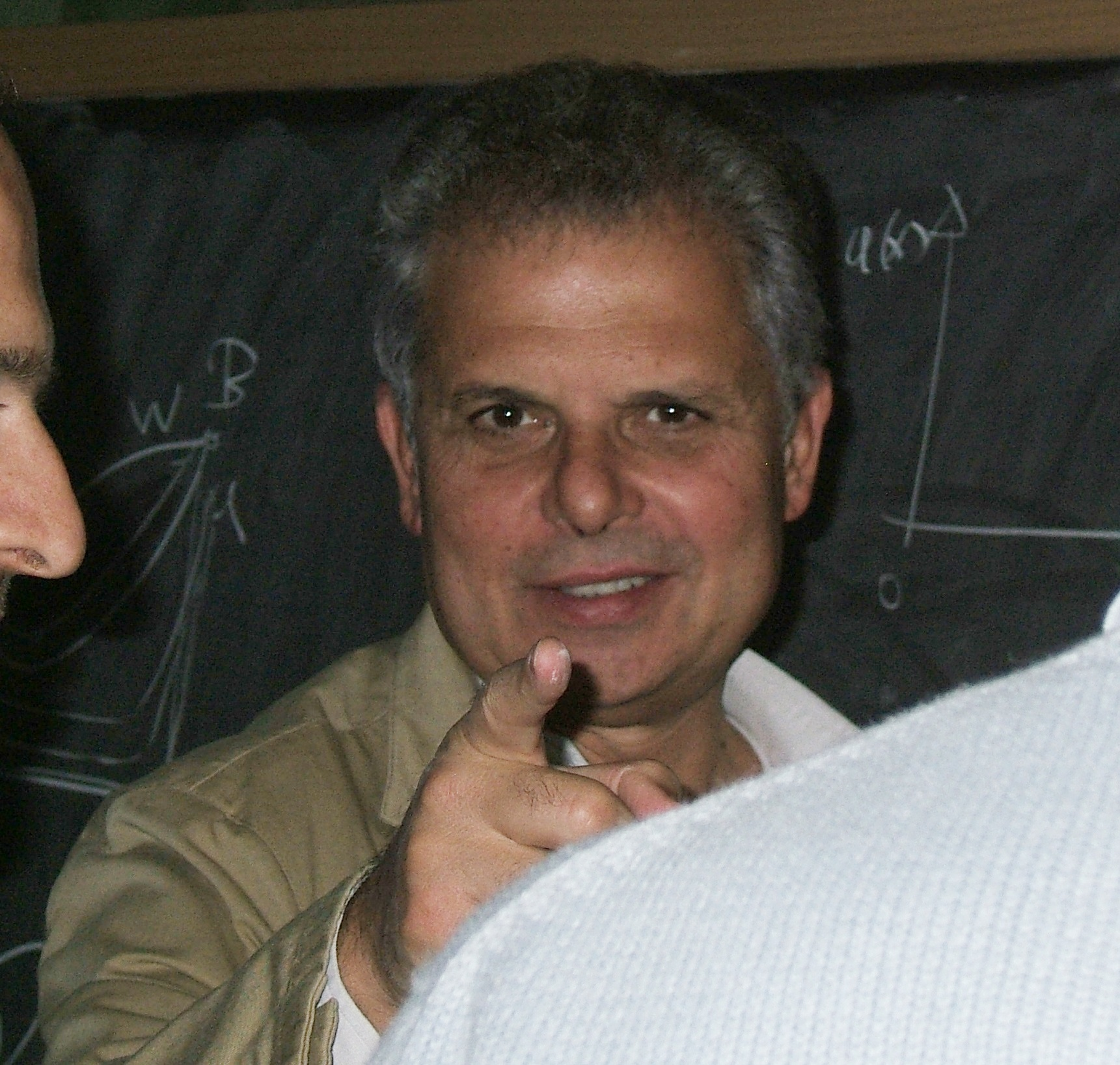
- Born: 25 June 1947 (age 79); Fabriano, Italy
- Known for: Calculus of variations, Regularity theory, p,q growth conditions, Semicontinuity, Quasiconvexity
- Scientific career
- Fields: Calculus of variations, Partial differential equations
- Workplaces: University of Florence, Università di Napoli "Federico II", University of Rome Tor Vergata
- Doctoral advisor: Ennio De Giorgi

Paolo Marcellini (born 25 June 1947 in Fabriano) is an Italian mathematician who deals with mathematical analysis. He was a full professor at the University of Florence,as of now he is a "Professor Emeritus", working on partial differential equations, calculus of variations and related mathematics. He was the Director of the Italian National Group GNAMPA of the Istituto Nazionale di Alta Matematica (INdAM) and Dean of the Faculty of Mathematical, Physical and Natural Sciences of the University of Florence.

== Biography ==
Marcellini received his Laurea Degree in 1971 at the Sapienza University of Rome and made his postgraduate studies from 1971–1973 at the Scuola Normale Superiore in Pisa under the supervision of Ennio De Giorgi. After that he was assistant and finally a lecturer at the University of Florence, in 1981 full professor at the University of Naples and then at the University of Tor Vergata in Rome.

Since 1985 he is Professor of Analysis in Florence. He was there Dean of the Faculty of Mathematics, Physics and Natural Sciences, Director of the Department of Mathematics "Ulisse Dini" and Coordinator of the graduate program in mathematics (PhD Doctoral Studies).

He was a visiting scientist, among others, the Collège de France in Paris, Bonn and Leipzig (University and Max Planck Institute), University of California at Berkeley, EPFL at Lausanne, Mathematical Institute of the University of Oxford, Carnegie-Mellon University in Pittsburgh, Lisbon, Instituto Argentino de Matematica in Buenos Aires, Russian Academy of Sciences Akademgorodok in Novosibirsk, the Institute for Advanced Study in Princeton, the University of Texas at Austin, University of Zurich, University of Cologne in Köln, University of Erlangen-Nuremberg, Hokkaido University in Tokyo, Academia Sinica in Taipei-Taiwan, the Australian National University and the Mittag-Leffler Institute in Sweden.

His academic interests mostly lie in the fields of calculus of variations and partial differential equations, including applications, for example in the theory of non-linear elasticity and in biology.

From 1999 to 2003 he was in Scientific Direction of the Istituto Nazionale di Alta Matematica in Rome. In 2007 he became a member of Academy of Sciences of the Tuscany "La Colombaria". From 2013 to 2017 he has been the elected Director of the Gruppo Nazionale per l'Analisi Matematica, la Probabilità e le loro Applicazioni (GNAMPA) of the Istituto Nazionale di Alta Matematica (INdAM).

== Recognition ==
In August 2023 Paolo Marcellini was selected as the winner of the 2022 Ames JMAA Prize, awarded annually for the best paper published in the Journal of Mathematical Analysis and Applications (JMAA) in the last three years. His paper “Growth conditions and regularity for weak solutions to nonlinear elliptic pdes”, JMAA, 501 (September 2021), 124408, was chosen unanimously by the Committee chaired by Professor José Bonet Solves. The award consists of a certificate of merit and a monetary prize donated by Elsevier and the American Mathematical Society (AMS).

== Bibliography ==
- with Bernard Dacorogna: Implicit partial differential equations, Birkhäuser 1999.
- with Bernard Dacorogna, Emanuele Paolini: Origami and Partial Differential Equations, Notices of the AMS, 57, May 2010, 598, Online
- with Carlo Sbordone: Analisi Matematica Uno, Napoli: Liguori 1996.
- with Carlo Sbordone, Nicola Fusco: Analisi Matematica Due, Napoli: Liguori 1996.
- with Carlo Sbordone, Nicola Fusco: Mathematical Analysis, Functions of Several Real Variables and Applications, Springer, January 2023, ISBN 978-3-031-04150-1.

== Selected publications ==
- Approximation of quasiconvex functions, and lower semicontinuity of multiple integrals, Manuscripta Math., 51, 1985, pp. 1–28.
- Regularity of minimizers of integrals of the calculus of variations with nonstandard growth conditions, Arch. Rational Mech. Anal., 105, 1989, 267–284.
- Regularity and existence of solutions of elliptic equations with p,q-growth conditions, J. Differential Equations, 90, 1991, 1–30.
- with Bernard Dacorogna: General existence theorems for Hamilton-Jacobi equations in the scalar and vectorial cases, Acta Mathematica, 178, 1997, 1–37.
- with Irene Fonseca, Nicola Fusco: On the total variation of the Jacobian, J. Funct. Anal., 207, 2004, 1–32.
- with Bernard Dacorogna, Emanuele Paolini: Origami and Partial Differential Equations, Notices of the AMS, 57, May 2010, 598, Online
- with Verena Bögelein, Frank Duzaar: Parabolic Systems with p,q-Growth: A Variational Approach, Arch. Ration. Mech. Anal., 210, 2013, 219–267.
- with Verena Bögelein, Frank Duzaar: Existence of evolutionary variational solutions via the calculus of variations, J. Differential Equations, 256, 2014, 3912–3942.
- Growth conditions and regularity for weak solutions to nonlinear elliptic pdes, Journal of Mathematical Analysis and Applications, 501, 2021, 124408 / Online
