= Panagiotis E. Souganidis =

Greek-American mathematician

Panagiotis E. Souganidis (Παναγιώτης E. Σουγανίδης) is an American mathematician, specializing in partial differential equations.

== Biography ==
Souganidis graduated in 1981 with B.A. from the National and Kapodistrian University of Athens. At the University of Wisconsin–Madison he graduated with M.A. in 1981 and Ph.D. in 1984 with thesis under the supervision of Michael G. Crandall. Souganidis was a postdoc in 1984–1985 at the University of Minnesota's Institute for Mathematics and its Applications and was at the Institute for Advanced Study in 1988 and 1990. After holding professorships at Brown University, the University of Wisconsin–Madison, and the University of Texas at Austin, he became in 2008 the Charles H. Swift Distinguished Service Professor in Mathematics at the University of Chicago. He has held visiting positions at academic institutions in Italy, Japan, Greece, France, the UK, and Sweden.

He works on non-linear partial differential equations, and stochastic analysis. The main parts of his work are qualitative properties of viscosity and entropy solutions, front propagation and asymptotic behavior of reaction diffusion equations and particle systems, stochastic homogenization, the theory of pathwise solutions for first and second order partial differential equations, including stochastic Hamilton-Jacobi equations and scalar conservation laws.

Souganidis is the author or co-author of over 100 publications in refereed journals. His wife is Thaleia Zariphopoulou, a Greek-American mathematician and professor at the University of Texas at Austin.

== Awards and honors ==
- 1989 — Sloan Research Fellow
- 1994 — Invited Speaker of the International Congress of Mathematicians
- 2003 — Highly Cited Researcher
- 2012 — Fellow of the American Mathematical Society (Class of 2013)
- 2015 — Fellow of the Society for Industrial and Applied Mathematics
- 2017 — Fellow of the American Association for the Advancement of Science
- 2019 — Invited Speaker of the International Congress on Industrial and Applied Mathematics
- 2026 — Invited Speaker of the AIMS conference in Athens, Greece.

== Selected publications ==
- Evans, L. C.; Souganidis, P. E. (1984). "Differential Games and Representation Formulas for Solutions of Hamilton-Jacobi-Isaacs Equations". Indiana University Mathematics Journal. 33 (5): 773–797. doi:10.1512/iumj.1984.33.33040. JSTOR 45010271.
- Souganidis, Panagiotis E. (1985). "Approximation schemes for viscosity solutions of Hamilton-Jacobi equations". Journal of Differential Equations. 59 (1): 1–43. Bibcode:1985JDE....59....1S. doi:10.1016/0022-0396(85)90136-6.
- Lions, P.-L.; Souganidis, P. E. (1985). "Differential Games, Optimal Control and Directional Derivatives of Viscosity Solutions of Bellman's and Isaacs' Equations". SIAM Journal on Control and Optimization. 23 (4): 566–583. doi:10.1137/0323036.
- Bona, J. L.; Souganidis, P. E.; Strauss, W. A. (1987). "Stability and Instability of Solitary Waves of Korteweg-de Vries Type". Proceedings of the Royal Society A: Mathematical, Physical and Engineering Sciences. 411 (1841): 395–412. Bibcode:1987RSPSA.411..395B. doi:10.1098/rspa.1987.0073. S2CID 120894859.
- Fleming, W. H.; Souganidis, P. E. (1989). "On the Existence of Value Functions of Two-Player, Zero-Sum Stochastic Differential Games". Indiana University Mathematics Journal. 38 (2): 293–314. doi:10.1512/iumj.1989.38.38015. JSTOR 24895386.
- Bona, J. L.; Souganidis, P. E.; Strauss, W. A. (1987). "Stability and Instability of Solitary Waves of Korteweg-de Vries Type". Proceedings of the Royal Society A: Mathematical, Physical and Engineering Sciences. 411 (1841): 395–412. Bibcode:1987RSPSA.411..395B. doi:10.1098/rspa.1987.0073. S2CID 120894859.
- Barles, G.; Soner, H. M.; Souganidis, P. E. (1993). "Front Propagation and Phase Field Theory". SIAM Journal on Control and Optimization. 31 (2): 439–469. doi:10.1137/0331021. S2CID 39091910.
- Lions, Pierre-Louis; Perthame, Benoît; Souganidis, Panagiotis E. (1998). "Existence and stability of entropy solutions for the hyperbolic systems of isentropic gas dynamics in Eulerian and Lagrangian coordinates". Communications on Pure and Applied Mathematics. 49 (6): 599–638. doi:10.1002/(SICI)1097-0312(199606)49:6<599::AID-CPA2>3.0.CO;2-5.
- Barles, Guy; Souganidis, Panagiotis E. (1998). "A New Approach to Front Propagation Problems: Theory and Applications". Archive for Rational Mechanics and Analysis. 141 (3): 237–296. Bibcode:1998ArRMA.141..237B. doi:10.1007/s002050050077. S2CID 121972598.
- Lions, Pierre-Louis; Souganidis, Panagiotis E. (2003). "Correctors for the homogenization of Hamilton-Jacobi equations in the stationary ergodic setting". Communications on Pure and Applied Mathematics. 56 (10): 1501–1524. doi:10.1002/cpa.10101. S2CID 121828182.
