= The Vondish Ambassador =

- First edition (publ. Misenchanted Press), cover artist: Kiri Evans
- Author: Lawrence Watt-Evans
- Language: English
- Publisher: Misenchanted Press
- Publication date: 2007
- Publication place: United States

The Vondish Ambassador (2007) is a fantasy novel by American writer Lawrence Watt-Evans set in his Ethshar universe. He serialized it with a variant of the Street Performer Protocol.
