= Alexander Krylov =

German economist

Alexander Krylov is a German scientist, sis a German s and Catholic priest.

== Biography ==
He was born into a German-Russian family in Russia. He studied history, economics and psychology and received a Ph.D. in social philosophy and psychoanalysis. In the 1990s, Krylov worked in a senior position at the “Children of Russia” foundation in Moscow. From 1998 to 2000, he worked as a lecturer and vice-dean. Since 2000, he lives in Germany. From 2001 to 2008, he worked at the Institute of World Economics and international Management of the University of Bremen. Since 2006, he is a professor for communication management. From 2008 to 2010, he was a professor at the University of Management and Communication Potsdam. Since 2008, he is heading the West-Ost-Institut (West-East Institute) Berlin. At the same time, he is the Vice-President of the Bremen School of Economics and Editor-in-Chief of the “West-Ost Report” journal. In 2011, he received a gold medal in recognition of his “outstanding contributions in the field of education and science”. In 1999, he was awarded with a diploma of the committee for entrepreneurship of the Russian parliament (Duma). The local government of the city of Moscow awarded him a prize in 1997 and in 2013 he was made an honorary professor.

== Science and Research ==
Krylov's main scientific focuses are psychoanalytical anthropology, human identity, communication and social change. According to him, traditional psychoanalysis has evolved from psychotherapy to philosophy. In his monograph “Evolution of Identity” (2010) he showed that the understanding of a human-being is influenced by social change. According to Krylov, the modern human being does no longer try to define himself through traditional identities, but increasingly through new ones. In his monograph “Religious Identities: individual and collective assertiveness in the post-industrial space” he shows that religion is one of the most important factors of identity. His research in the area of economics makes him one of the pioneers of communication management in Eastern Europe. According to Krylov, the development of new forms of management is a sign of the increasing social sensitization of business. His research in the area of business and management is closely connected to communication psychology, morality and ethics.

== Theology and church work ==
After his ordination, Krylov served as chaplain in Kaarst, Bonn-Bad Godesberg, and Langenfeld. Since May 2024, he has been parish priest of the large parish of Langenfeld and Monheim am Rhein. He is active in new evangelization and the transmission of faith. He has published several books containing homilies, Gospel commentaries, and spiritual reflections. His catechetical book for First Communion and Confirmation has been widely distributed in Germany. Krylov also runs a YouTube channel under the name youprist . Several of his video documentaries have been broadcast by the Catholic television network K-TV.
