= Nikolay Krylov (physicist) =

Soviet theoretical physicist (1917–1947)

Nikolay Sergeevich Krylov (Russian: Никола́й Серге́евич Крыло́в; 10 August 1917 – 21 June 1947) was a Soviet theoretical physicist known for his work on the problems of classical mechanics, statistical physics, and quantum mechanics. He showed that a sufficient condition for a dynamical system to relax to equilibrium is for it to be mixing.

== Biography ==
Krylov was born in Ustyuzhna, Vologda Governorate, of the Russian Empire. He graduated in physics from the Leningrad University. He then was a doctoral student in the Leningrad University's theoretical physics group supervised by Vladimir Fock, and wrote thesis on the foundations of statistical mechanics entitled Mixing processes in phase space awarded by for the degree of Candidate of Science in 1941. During the German invasion of the Soviet Union and the Siege of Leningrad, Krylov was assigned to the air defense of the city. He continued research work at Kazan for the Physical-Technical Institute of the Academy of Sciences of the Soviet Union, when the Institute was relocated due to the siege, while on active duty and defended dissertation The processes of relaxation of statistical systems and the criterion of mechanical instability awarded by the degree of Doctor of Science the following year. He then worked at the various Soviet Union's academic institutes, in 1947 together with his supervisor coauthored the Fock-Krylov theorem on quasi-stationary state decay in quantum mechanics, returned to Leningrad, but fell ill in 1946 and died due to sepsis caused by a streptococcus.

In 1950, his supervisor Vladimir Fock and fellow student Arkady Migdal published first chapters of his unfinished monograph started after he returned to Leningrad, text of the Doctor of Science dissertation and a small article, later translated by Migdal along with Yakov Sinai and published with a help of A. S. Wightman, which contained Fock's biographical note, description of Krylov's theoretical views by both Migdal and Fock. Wightman's preface compared Krylov's ideas to the results by Poincaré, Birkhoff, von Neumann, Hopf, Kolmogorov, Khinchin, and Wiener, whereas the book was compared by him to the classical books in statistical mechanics by Maxwell, Boltzmann, Gibbs, and Ehrenfest and Afanasjewa-Ehrenfest. Thanks to this effort, Krylov's research results had received a permanent place in modern theoretical physics and have laid the foundations of dynamical systems theory and quantum mechanics.

== Selected publications ==
- Krylov, N. (10 June 1944). "Relaxation Processes in Statistical Systems". Nature. 153 (3893): 709–710. Bibcode:1944Natur.153..709K. doi:10.1038/153709a0. ISSN 1476-4687. S2CID 4122818.
- N. S. Krylov (1979). Works on the foundations of statistical physics. Princeton University Press. ISBN 0-691-08227-8.
