= Nikolay Krylov (mathematician, born 1941) =

Russian mathematician

Nicolai Vladimirovich Krylov
- Born: 5 June 1941 (age 85); Sudogda, Russian SFSR
- Citizenship: Russian
- Education: Moscow State University
- Awards: Leroy P. Steele Prize for Seminal Contribution to Research (2004)
- Scientific career
- Fields: Mathematics
- Workplaces: University of Minnesota
- Doctoral advisor: Eugene Dynkin
- Doctoral students: István Gyöngy

Nicolai Vladimirovich Krylov (Russian: Никола́й Влади́мирович Крыло́в; born 5 June 1941) is a Russian mathematician specializing in partial differential equations, particularly stochastic partial differential equations and diffusion processes. Krylov studied at Lomonosov University, where he in 1966 under E. B. Dynkin attained a doctoral candidate title (similar to a PhD) and in 1973 a Russian doctoral degree (somewhat more prestigious than a PhD). He taught from 1966 to 1990 at the Lomonosov University and is since 1990 a professor at the University of Minnesota. At the beginning of his career (starting from 1963) he, in collaboration with Dynkin, worked on nonlinear stochastic control theory, making advances in the study of convex, nonlinear partial equations of 2nd order (i.e. Bellman equations), which were examined with stochastic methods. This led to the Evans-Krylov theory, for which he received with Lawrence C. Evans in 2004 the Leroy P. Steele Prize of the American Mathematical Society (for work done simultaneously and independently by both Krylov and Evans). They proved the second order differentiability (Hölder continuity of the second derivative) of the solutions of convex, completely nonlinear, second order elliptical partial differential equations and thus the existence of "classical solutions" (Theorem of Evans-Krylov). He was in 1978 at Helsinki and in 1986 at Berkeley an invited speaker for the ICM. He received the Humboldt Research Award in 2001. In 1993 he was elected a member of the American Academy of Arts and Sciences (1993). He should not be confused with the mathematician Nikolay M. Krylov.

== Works ==
- Controlled diffusion processes, Springer 1980
- Introduction to the theory of diffusion processes, AMS 1995
- Nonlinear elliptic and parabolic equations of the second order, Dordrecht, Reidel 1987
- Lectures on elliptic and parabolic equations in Hölder Spaces, AMS 1996
- Introduction to the theory of random processes, AMS 2002
- Lectures on Elliptic and Parabolic Equations in Sobolev Spaces, AMS 2008
