= Andrei Krylov (composer) =

Guitarist and composer

- Born: 3 March 1959 (age 67)
- Genre: Art music
- Instruments: 7 & 6 string guitar, flute, keyboards
- Years active: 1972–present
- Label: CDbaby
- Website: krylovmusic.googlepages.com

Andrei Krylov (Russian: Андрей Крылов, born March 3, 1959), is a guitarist and composer, best known for his fantasy and romantic music compositions for the classical guitar and lute.

== Biography ==
Krylov was born in Leningrad, USSR and began his study of the classical guitar in the early 1970s. In 1998, he emigrated from Russia to Canada.

Since 1998, he has lived in Ontario and Quebec. Krylov has spent a lot of time in the United States, Mexico, Portugal, Spain and other countries in Europe - playing concerts and composing music. He has composed music for documentaries and films in Canada and USA.

Krylov has also written several books: Mirrors, Lake Monastery, Autumn.

== See also ==
- List of ambient music artists
