= Darboux's theorem =

Foundational result in symplectic geometry

In differential geometry, a field in mathematics, Darboux's theorem is a theorem providing a normal form for special classes of differential 1-forms, partially generalizing the Frobenius integration theorem. It is named after Jean Gaston Darboux who established it as the solution of the Pfaff problem.

It is a foundational result in several fields, the chief among them being symplectic geometry. Indeed, one of its many consequences is that any two symplectic manifolds of the same dimension are locally symplectomorphic to one another. That is, every $2n$-dimensional symplectic manifold can be made to look locally like the linear symplectic space $\mathbb{C}^n$ with its canonical symplectic form.

There is also an analogous consequence of the theorem applied to contact geometry.

== Statement ==
Suppose that $\theta$ is a differential 1-form on an $n$-dimensional manifold, such that $\mathrm{d} \theta$ has constant rank $p$. Then

- if $\theta \wedge \left(\mathrm{d}\theta\right)^p = 0$ everywhere, then there is a local system of coordinates $(x_1,\ldots,x_{n-p},y_1,\ldots, y_p)$ in which
  $$\theta=x_1\,\mathrm{d}y_1+\ldots + x_p\,\mathrm{d}y_p;$$
- if $\theta \wedge \left( \mathrm{d} \theta \right)^p \ne 0$ everywhere, then there is a local system of coordinates $(x_1,\ldots,x_{n-p},y_1,\ldots, y_p)$ in which
  $$\theta=x_1\,\mathrm{d}y_1+\ldots + x_p\,\mathrm{d}y_p + \mathrm{d}x_{p+1}.$$

Darboux's original proof used induction on $p$ and it can be equivalently presented in terms of distributions or of differential ideals.

=== Frobenius' theorem ===
Darboux's theorem for $p=0$ ensures that any 1-form $\theta \neq 0$ such that $\theta \wedge d\theta = 0$ can be written as $\theta = dx_1$ in some coordinate system $(x_1,\ldots,x_n)$.

This recovers one of the formulation of Frobenius theorem in terms of differential forms: if $\mathcal{I} \subset \Omega^*(M)$ is the differential ideal generated by $\theta$, then $\theta \wedge d\theta = 0$ implies the existence of a coordinate system $(x_1,\ldots,x_n)$ where $\mathcal{I} \subset \Omega^*(M)$ is actually generated by $d x_1$.

== Darboux's theorem for symplectic manifolds ==
Suppose that $\omega$ is a symplectic 2-form on an $n=2m$-dimensional manifold $M$. In a neighborhood of each point $p$ of $M$, by the Poincaré lemma, there is a 1-form $\theta$ with $\mathrm{d} \theta = \omega$. Moreover, $\theta$ satisfies the first set of hypotheses in Darboux's theorem, and so locally there is a coordinate chart $U$ near $p$ in which
$$\theta=x_1\,\mathrm{d}y_1+\ldots + x_m\,\mathrm{d}y_m.$$

Taking an exterior derivative now shows

$$\omega = \mathrm{d} \theta = \mathrm{d}x_1 \wedge \mathrm{d}y_1 + \ldots + \mathrm{d}x_m \wedge \mathrm{d}y_m.$$

The chart $U$ is said to be a Darboux chart around $p$. The manifold $M$ can be covered by such charts.

To state this differently, identify $\mathbb{R}^{2m}$ with $\mathbb{C}^{m}$ by letting $z_j=x_j+\textit{i}\,y_j$. If $\varphi: U \to \mathbb{C}^n$ is a Darboux chart, then $\omega$ can be written as the pullback of the standard symplectic form $\omega_0$ on $\mathbb{C}^{n}$:

$$\omega = \varphi^{*}\omega_0.\,$$

A modern proof of this result, without employing Darboux's general statement on 1-forms, is done using Moser's trick.

=== Comparison with Riemannian geometry ===
Darboux's theorem for symplectic manifolds implies that there are no local invariants in symplectic geometry: a Darboux basis can always be taken, valid near any given point. This is in marked contrast to the situation in Riemannian geometry where the curvature is a local invariant, an obstruction to the metric being locally a sum of squares of coordinate differentials.

The difference is that Darboux's theorem states that $\omega$ can be made to take the standard form in an entire neighborhood around $p$. In Riemannian geometry, the metric can always be made to take the standard form at any given point, but not always in a neighborhood around that point.

=== Darboux's theorem for contact manifolds ===
Another particular case is recovered when $n=2p+1$; if $\theta \wedge \left( \mathrm{d} \theta \right)^p \ne 0$ everywhere, then $\theta$ is a contact form. A simpler proof can be given, as in the case of symplectic structures, by using Moser's trick.

== The Darboux-Weinstein theorem ==
Alan Weinstein showed that the Darboux's theorem for symplectic manifolds can be strengthened to hold on a neighborhood of a submanifold:

Let $M$ be a smooth manifold endowed with two symplectic forms $\omega_1$ and $\omega_2$, and let $N \subset M$ be a closed submanifold. If $\left.\omega_1\right|_N = \left.\omega_2\right|_N$, then there is a neighborhood $U$ of $N$ in $M$ and a diffeomorphism $f : U \to U$ such that $f^*\omega_2 = \omega_1$.

The standard Darboux theorem is recovered when $N$ is a point and $\omega_2$ is the standard symplectic structure on a coordinate chart.

This theorem also holds for infinite-dimensional Banach manifolds.

== See also ==
- Carathéodory–Jacobi–Lie theorem, a generalization of this theorem.
- Moser's trick
- Symplectic basis
