= Bernard Dacorogna =

Swiss mathematician

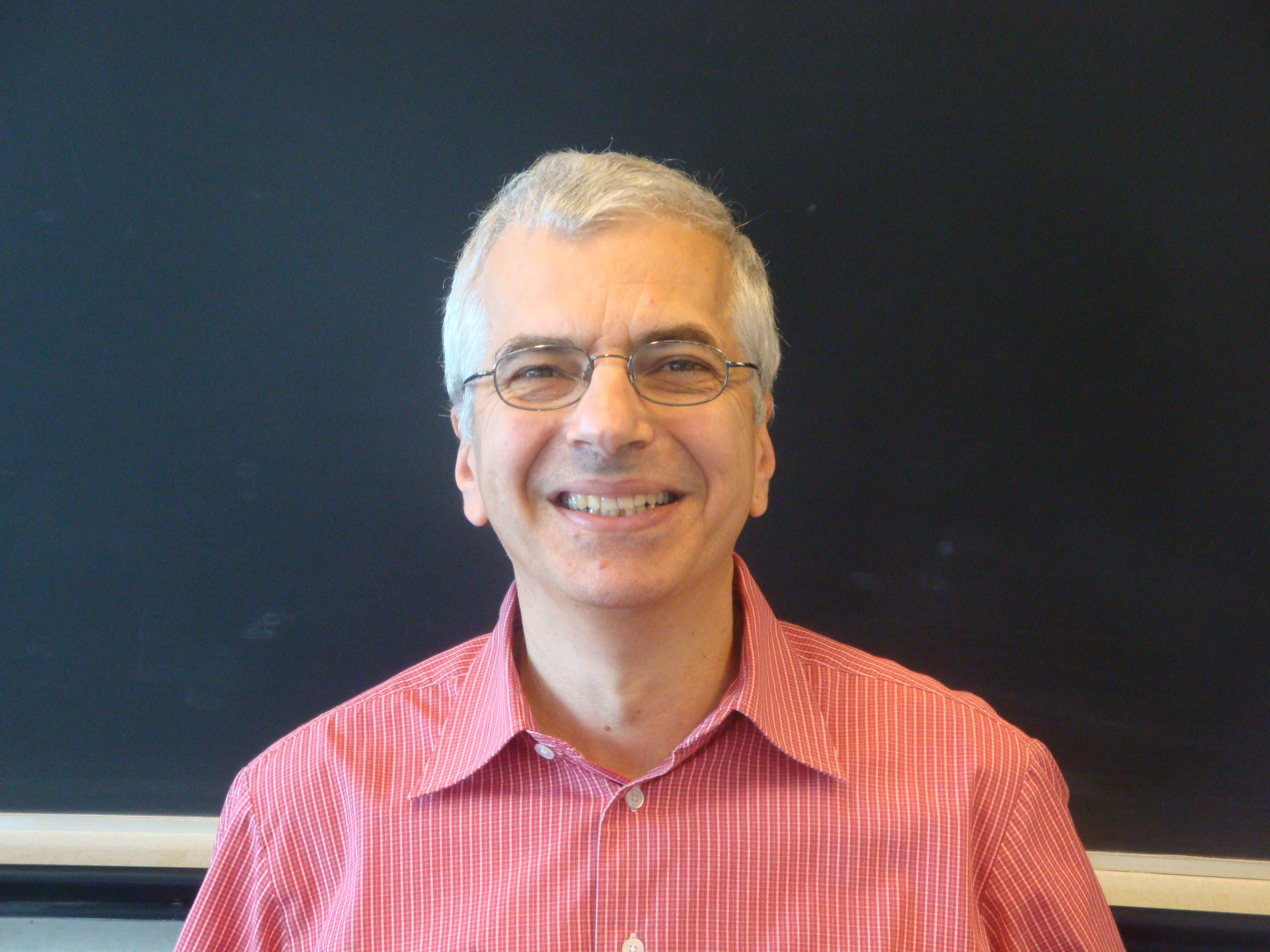
- Born: 15 October 1953 (age 72); Alexandria, Egypt
- Education: University of Geneva; Heriot-Watt University
- Scientific career
- Fields: Mathematics
- Workplaces: École Polytechnique Fédérale de Lausanne
- Doctoral advisor: John M. Ball

Bernard Dacorogna (born 15 October 1953 in Alexandria, Egypt) is a Swiss mathematician. He completed his undergraduate studies at the University of Geneva in Switzerland and his Ph.D. at Heriot-Watt University in Edinburgh, UK, in 1980 under the supervision of John M. Ball. He is a professor at Ecole Polytechnique Fédérale de Lausanne (EPFL), Switzerland. He is a specialist of the calculus of variations and of partial differential equations. He has written several articles and books. The Chaire de la Vallée Poussin 2018 of the Université Catholique de Louvain (Belgium) is attributed to him.

== Books ==
- Weak continuity and weak lower semi-continuity of non linear functionals; Lecture Notes in Math. Springer-Verlag, Berlin, Vol. 922 (1982). PDF According to WorldCat, the book is held in 419 libraries
- Direct methods in the calculus of variations; Springer-Verlag, New-York (1989), 2nd ed. (2007). According to WorldCat, the book is held in 625 libraries PDF.
- Introduction to the calculus of variations; Imperial College Press, London (2004), 2nd ed. (2009), 3rd ed (2014); According to WorldCat, the book is held in 882 libraries. PDF.
- Implicit partial differential equations; avec P. Marcellini, Birkhäuser, PNLDE Series, Boston, 37 (1999). PDF
- The pullback equation for differential forms; with G. Csato et O. Kneuss, Birkhäuser, PNLDE Series, New York, 83 (2012). PDF
