= Sergei Krylov (singer) =

Russian singer, showman and actor (born 1961)

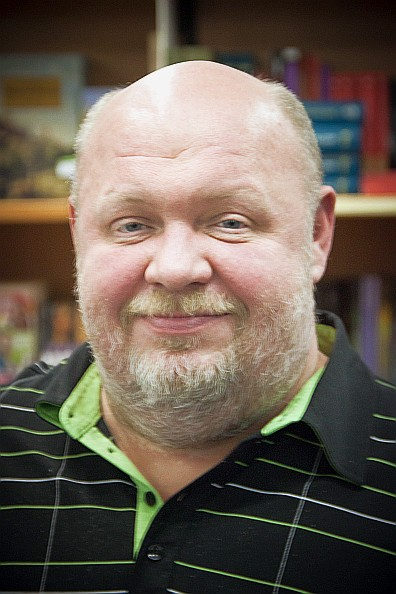

Background information
- Born: Sergei Lvovich Krylov; August 25, 1961 (age 65)
- Genres: Pop, Russian pop
- Occupation: Singer
- Years active: 1987–present

Sergei Lvovich Krylov (Russian: Серге́й Льво́вич Крыло́в; born August 25, 1961, in Tula, RSFSR, USSR) is a Russian singer, showman and actor.

== Early life ==
He was born in the city of Tula, August 25, 1961, into the family of Valentina (1941–2004) and Lev Krylov (1938–1984). His mother was killed by robbers in July 2004, together with his stepfather Alexey Dmitrievich Tarkhanov (1926–2004). His mother worked all her life at an arms factory. His stepfather was a veteran of the war. Sergei helped him financially to have surgery for throat cancer.

In 1977, he graduated from music school and in 1978, he graduated from high school № 49 of Tula. From 1981–1985, he studied in the Yaroslavl theatrical institute. In 1986, he became a member of the All-Union Studio SPM "Record" (Moscow).

== Career ==
In March 1987, he recorded a solo album of 11 songs called The Illusion of Life.

His first performance came on April 1, 1987, at the celebration of the Day of laughter. It was the debut in October of Morning mail with Black Sea.

In 1989, he joined Valery Leontiev and his group "Echo" on a trip to India and where they made a concert film Made in India.

In 1992, Krylov appeared in the role of Ostap Bender in the movie Vasily Pichul's Idiot Dreams.

In 1994, he carried out the project "Angel 421" in which Krylov acted as an intermediary between the sponsor and the representative of Russia (Masha Katz – Youddiph) at the 39th Eurovision contest in Dublin, offsetting the sponsor costs in the amount of $100,000 from his personal funds and recorded an album of songs based on poems by Alexander Dobronravov and Victor Pelenyagre.

The show Angel 421 was shown in Samara, Tula, Saratov and Togliatti.

In early 1994, he released the album Port Said with his greatest hits from 1988 to 1993, yielding a gold album. In November 1995, Krylov gave a solo concert at New York concert hall Manhattan Center Studios.

In December 1996 – January 1997, he recorded a 12-song album Monsieur Vysotsky, return to us, dedicated to the 60th anniversary of Vladimir Vysotsky. The songs are written in the style of urban romance. One of them – the song of Vladimir Vysotsky. Kharkov cult group Raznye Lyudi took part in the recording of the album.

In 2008, the leadership of the Sochi Winter Theater proposed to create a theatrical performance based on the movie The Diamond Arm. Krylov agreed. However, due to the financial crisis this project was suspended. Krylov planned to portray Lyolik (Anatoly Papanov's character), but, according to him, would have gladly shared this role, "if one of his star colleagues will want to play this character".

He participated in the reality show Last Hero and the program You superstar!.

== Personal life ==
He married Larisa Makarova, with whom he had a daughter, Karolina (born January 31, 1980). Later he married Lyubov Dubovik, with whom he had a son, Yan (born November 5, 1992).

== Discography ==
- 1987 – The Illusion of Life
- 1988 – The Sea
- 1994 – Port Said
- 1994 – Angel 421
- 1994 – Yoksel-mokselan (children's songs)
- 1997 – Monsieur Vysotsky, return to us
- 2003 – It's okay

== Filmography ==
- Bursa (1990)
- Gangsters in the Ocean (1992)
- Fictitious Marriage (1992)
- Idiot Dreams (1993) as Ostap Bender
- Black Room (TV, 2000) as porter
- Egor's Mountain (2008) as bank representative
- Big Difference (2008) as cameo

== Awards ==
- Lomonosov Order (August 25, 2006) – for outstanding achievements in the social, cultural, social and charitable activities in the field of art
