= Lawrence Watt-Evans =

American speculative fiction writer (born 1954)

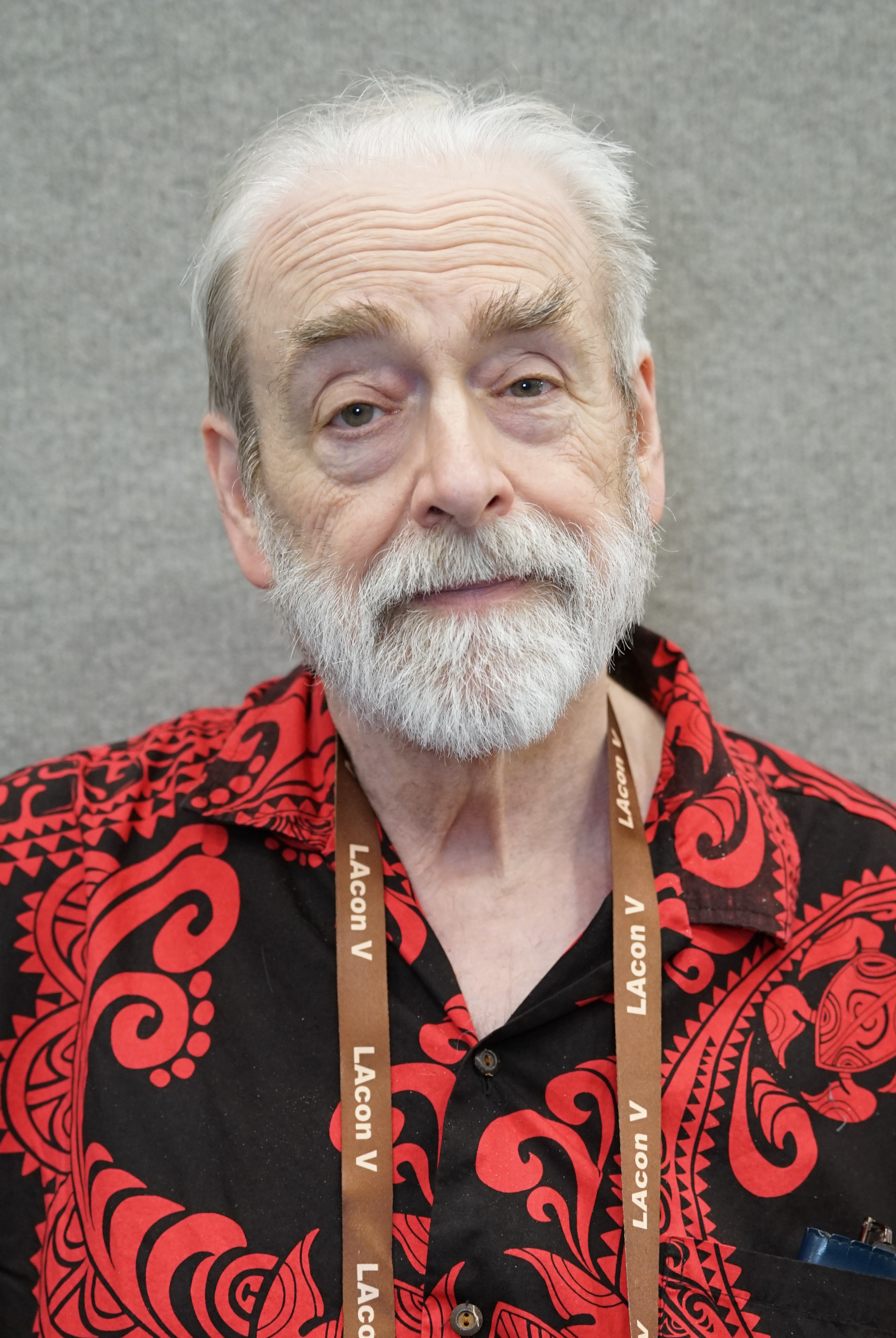
Watt-Evans at Worldcon 2026

Lawrence Watt-Evans (born 1954) is one of the pseudonyms of American science fiction and fantasy author Lawrence Watt Evans (another pseudonym, used primarily for science fiction, is Nathan Archer).

== Biography ==
Born in Arlington, Massachusetts, as the fourth of six children, he made his first attempts at professional writing when he was eight.

After graduating from Bedford High School in Bedford, Massachusetts, he attended Princeton University but left without a degree. By the rules of Princeton, he could not reapply for a year, during which he began to seriously try to sell his writing, but he sold nothing significant until The Lure of the Basilisk in 1979 (published 1980); he began then writing full-time. Despite having sold a short story and several articles under his real name, he initially submitted his first novel under a pseudonym. It was the editor of that novel, Lester del Rey, who first demanded for him to use his real name, and del Rey added the hyphen to create the name Lawrence Watt-Evans. Evans had insisted on including his middle name to avoid confusion with a contemporary nonfiction writer, also named Lawrence Evans, and del Rey had then added the hyphen "to make it more distinctive".

Watt-Evans was president of the Horror Writers Association from 1994 to 1996, and has also served as Eastern Regional Director and treasurer of Science Fiction and Fantasy Writers of America. From 1995 to 1997, he was half of a partnership known as Malicious Press (with screenwriter Terry Rossio), which published Deathrealm magazine, edited by Stephen Mark Rainey and he was the managing editor of the webzine Helix SF for its entire run of ten quarterly issues.

In April 2005, Watt-Evans announced that the first draft of his latest Ethshar novel, The Spriggan Mirror, would be made available online as a serial, using a modified version of the Street Performer Protocol. The draft has since been finished and was previously available in its entirety on one of Watt-Evans' websites. However, a revised version has now been published commercially in both electronic and paper editions, so the free version has been removed. He since completed several online serials, all using that same method: The Vondish Ambassador in 2007, Realms of Light started November 2008 (his only non-Ethshar serial, a sequel to Nightside City), The Final Calling started in June 2010 (later published as The Unwelcome Warlock). In April–July 2012 he did a 5th serial, The Sorcerer's Widow.

In June 2013 Watt-Evans began a crowd-funding campaign for his unpublished science fiction novel Vika's Avenger, a story unrelated to his previous works, and in July he started a sixth Ethshar serial, Ishta's Companion. In 2014 he announced that, as the response to the campaign for Ishta's Companion had been disappointing, he would stop writing online serials. The book was published as Relics Of War.
