= Courant bracket =

It is a generalization of the Lie bracket from an operation on the tangent bundle

In differential geometry, a field of mathematics, the Courant bracket is a generalization of the Lie bracket from an operation on the tangent bundle to an operation on the direct sum of the tangent bundle and the vector bundle of p-forms.

The case $p = 1$ was introduced by Theodore James Courant in his 1990 doctoral dissertation as a structure that bridges Poisson geometry and pre-symplectic geometry, based on work with his advisor Alan Weinstein. The twisted version of the Courant bracket was introduced in 2001 by Pavol Severa, and studied in collaboration with Weinstein.

Today a complex version of the $p = 1$ Courant bracket plays a central role in the field of generalized complex geometry, introduced by Nigel Hitchin in 2002. Closure under the Courant bracket is the integrability condition of a generalized almost complex structure.

== Definition ==
Let $X$ and $Y$ be vector fields on an $N$-dimensional real manifold $M$ and let $\xi$ and $\eta$ be $p$-forms. Then $X + \xi$ and $Y + \eta$ are sections of the direct sum $TM \oplus \wedge^p T^*M$ of the tangent bundle and the bundle of $p$-forms. The Courant bracket of $X + \xi$ and $Y + \eta$ is defined to be

$$[X+\xi,Y+\eta]=[X,Y]
+\mathcal{L}_X\eta-\mathcal{L}_Y\xi
-\frac{1}{2}d(i(X)\eta-i(Y)\xi)$$

where $\mathcal{L}_X$ is the Lie derivative along the vector field $X$, $d$ is the exterior derivative and $\iota$ is the interior product.

== Properties ==
The Courant bracket is antisymmetric but it does not satisfy the Jacobi identity for $p$ greater than zero.

=== The Jacobi identity ===
However, at least in the case $p = 1$, the Jacobiator, which measures a bracket's failure to satisfy the Jacobi identity, is an exact form. It is the exterior derivative of a form which plays the role of the Nijenhuis tensor in generalized complex geometry.

The Courant bracket is the antisymmetrization of the Dorfman bracket, which does satisfy a kind of Jacobi identity.

=== Symmetries ===
Like the Lie bracket, the Courant bracket is invariant under diffeomorphisms of the manifold M. It also enjoys an additional symmetry under the vector bundle automorphism

$$X+\xi\mapsto X+\xi+i(X)\alpha$$

where $\alpha$ is a closed $(p+1)$-form. In the $p = 1$ case, which is the relevant case for the geometry of flux compactifications in string theory, this transformation is known in the physics literature as a shift in the B field.

== Dirac and generalized complex structures ==
The cotangent bundle, ${\mathbf T}^*$ of $M$ is the bundle of differential one-forms. In the case $p = 1$ the Courant bracket maps two sections of ${\mathbf T}\oplus{\mathbf{T}}^*$, the direct sum of the tangent and cotangent bundles, to another section of ${\mathbf T}\oplus{\mathbf{T}}^*$. The fibers of ${\mathbf T}\oplus{\mathbf{T}}^*$ admit inner products with signature $(N,N)$ given by

$$\langle X+\xi,Y+\eta\rangle=\frac{1}{2}(\xi(Y)+\eta(X)).$$

A linear subspace of ${\mathbf T}\oplus{\mathbf{T}}^*$ in which all pairs of vectors have zero inner product is said to be an isotropic subspace. The fibers of ${\mathbf T}\oplus{\mathbf{T}}^*$ are $2N$-dimensional and the maximal dimension of an isotropic subspace is $N$. An $N$-dimensional isotropic subspace is called a maximal isotropic subspace.

A Dirac structure is a maximally isotropic subbundle of ${\mathbf T}\oplus{\mathbf{T}}^*$ whose sections are closed under the Courant bracket. Dirac structures include as special cases symplectic structures, Poisson structures and foliated geometries.

A generalized complex structure is defined identically, but one tensors ${\mathbf T}\oplus{\mathbf{T}}^*$ by the complex numbers and uses the complex dimension in the above definitions and one imposes that the direct sum of the subbundle and its complex conjugate be the entire original bundle $({\mathbf T}\oplus{\mathbf{T}}^*)\otimes \mathbf C$. Special cases of generalized complex structures include complex structure and a version of Kähler structure which includes the B-field.

== Dorfman bracket ==
In 1987 Irene Dorfman introduced the Dorfman bracket $[\cdot, \cdot]_D$, which like the Courant bracket provides an integrability condition for Dirac structures. It is defined by

$$[A,B]_D=[A,B]+d\langle A,B\rangle$$.

The Dorfman bracket is not antisymmetric, but it is often easier to calculate with than the Courant bracket because it satisfies a Leibniz rule which resembles the Jacobi identity

$$[A,[B,C]_D]_D=[[A,B]_D,C]_D+[B,[A,C]_D]_D.$$

== Courant algebroid ==
The Courant bracket does not satisfy the Jacobi identity and so it does not define a Lie algebroid, in addition it fails to satisfy the Lie algebroid condition on the anchor map. Instead it defines a more general structure introduced by Zhang-Ju Liu, Alan Weinstein and Ping Xu known as a Courant algebroid.

== Twisted Courant bracket ==
=== Definition and properties ===
The Courant bracket may be twisted by a $(p+2)$-form $H$, by adding the interior product of the vector fields $X$ and $Y$ of $H$. It remains antisymmetric and invariant under the addition of the interior product with a $(p+1)$-form $B$. When $B$ is not closed then this invariance is still preserved if one adds $dB$ to the final $H$.

If $H$ is closed then the Jacobiator is exact and so the twisted Courant bracket still defines a Courant algebroid. In string theory, $H$ is interpreted as the Neveu–Schwarz 3-form.

=== p=0: Circle-invariant vector fields ===
When $p=0$ the Courant bracket reduces to the Lie bracket on a principal circle bundle over $M$ with curvature given by the 2-form twist $H$. The bundle of 0-forms is the trivial bundle, and a section of the direct sum of the tangent bundle and the trivial bundle defines a circle invariant vector field on this circle bundle.

Concretely, a section of the sum of the tangent and trivial bundles is given by a vector field $X$ and a function $f$ and the Courant bracket is

$$[X+f,Y+g]=[X,Y]+Xg-Yf$$

which is just the Lie bracket of the vector fields

$$[X+f,Y+g]=[X+f\frac{\partial}{\partial\theta},Y+g\frac{\partial}{\partial\theta}]_{Lie}$$

where $\theta$ is a coordinate on the circle fiber. Note in particular that the Courant bracket satisfies the Jacobi identity in the case $p=0$.

=== Integral twists and gerbes ===
The curvature of a circle bundle always represents an integral cohomology class, the Chern class of the circle bundle. Thus the above geometric interpretation of the twisted $p=0$ Courant bracket only exists when H represents an integral class. Similarly at higher values of $p$ the twisted Courant brackets can be geometrically realized as untwisted Courant brackets twisted by gerbes when H is an integral cohomology class.
