= Complex structure =

A complex structure may refer to:

== In mathematics ==
- Almost complex manifold
- Complex manifold
- Linear complex structure
- Generalized complex structure
- Complex structure deformation
- Complex vector bundle#Complex structure

== In law ==
- Complex structure theory in English law

== See also ==
- Real structure
