= Courant algebroid =

Concept in differential geometry

In differential geometry, a field of mathematics, a Courant algebroid is a vector bundle together with an inner product and a compatible bracket more general than that of a Lie algebroid.

It is named after Theodore Courant, who had implicitly devised in 1990 the standard prototype of Courant algebroid through his discovery of a skew-symmetric bracket on $TM\oplus T^*M$, called Courant bracket today, which fails to satisfy the Jacobi identity. The general notion of Courant algebroid was introduced by Zhang-Ju Liu, Alan Weinstein and Ping Xu in their investigation of doubles of Lie bialgebroids in 1997.

== Definition ==
A Courant algebroid consists of the data a vector bundle $E\to M$ with a bracket $[\cdot,\cdot]:\Gamma E \times \Gamma E \to \Gamma E$, a non degenerate fiber-wise inner product $\langle \cdot, \cdot \rangle: E\times E\to M\times\R$, and a bundle map $\rho:E\to TM$ (called anchor) subject to the following axioms:

1. Jacobi identity: $[\phi, [\chi, \psi]] = [[\phi, \chi], \psi] + [\chi, [\phi, \psi]]$
2. Leibniz rule: $[\phi, f\psi] = \rho(\phi)f\psi +f[\phi, \psi]$
3. Obstruction to skew-symmetry: $[\phi,\psi] + [\psi,\phi] = \tfrac12 D\langle \phi,\psi \rangle$
4. Invariance of the inner product under the bracket: $\rho(\phi)\langle \psi,\chi \rangle= \langle [\phi,\psi],\chi \rangle + \langle \psi, [\phi,\chi] \rangle$

where $\phi, \chi, \psi$ are sections of $E$ and $f$ is a smooth function on the base manifold $M$. The map $D: \mathcal{C}^\infty(M) \to \Gamma E$ is the composition $\kappa^{-1}\rho^T d: \mathcal{C}^\infty(M) \to \Gamma E$, with $d: \mathcal{C}^\infty(M) \to \Omega^1 (M)$ the de Rham differential, $\rho^T$ the dual map of $\rho$, and $\kappa$ the isomorphism $E \to E^*$ induced by the inner product.

=== Skew-symmetric definition ===
An alternative definition can be given to make the bracket skew-symmetric as

$$[[\phi,\psi]]= \tfrac12\big([\phi,\psi]-[\psi,\phi]\big.)$$

This no longer satisfies the Jacobi identity axiom above. It instead fulfills a homotopic Jacobi identity.

$$[[\phi,[[\psi,\chi]]\,]] +\text{cycl.} = DT(\phi,\psi,\chi)$$

where $T$ is

$$T(\phi,\psi,\chi)=\frac13\langle [\phi,\psi],\chi\rangle +\text{cycl.}$$

The Leibniz rule and the invariance of the scalar product become modified by the relation $[[\phi,\psi]] = [\phi,\psi] -\tfrac12 D\langle \phi,\psi\rangle$ and the violation of skew-symmetry gets replaced by the axiom

$$\rho\circ D = 0$$

The skew-symmetric bracket $[[\cdot,\cdot]]$ together with the derivation $D$ and the Jacobiator $T$ form a strongly homotopic Lie algebra.

== Properties ==
The bracket $[\cdot,\cdot]$ is not skew-symmetric as one can see from the third axiom. Instead it fulfills a certain Jacobi identity (first axiom) and a Leibniz rule (second axiom). From these two axioms one can derive that the anchor map $\rho$ is a morphism of brackets:

$$\rho[\phi,\psi] = [\rho(\phi),\rho(\psi)] .$$

The fourth rule is an invariance of the inner product under the bracket. Polarization leads to

$$\rho(\phi)\langle \chi,\psi\rangle= \langle [\phi,\chi],\psi\rangle +\langle \chi,[\phi,\psi]\rangle .$$

== Examples ==
An example of the Courant algebroid is given by the Dorfman bracket on the direct sum $TM\oplus T^*M$ with a twist introduced by Ševera in 1988, defined as:

$$[X+\xi, Y+\eta] := [X,Y]+(\mathcal{L}_X\,\eta -\iota_Y d\xi +\iota_X \iota_Y H)$$

where $X,Y$ are vector fields, $\xi, \eta$ are 1-forms and $H$ is a closed 3-form twisting the bracket. This bracket is used to describe the integrability of generalized complex structures.

A more general example arises from a Lie algebroid $A$ whose induced differential on $A^*$ will be written as $d$ again. Then use the same formula as for the Dorfman bracket with $H$ an A-3-form closed under $d$.

Another example of a Courant algebroid is a quadratic Lie algebra, i.e. a Lie algebra with an invariant scalar product. Here the base manifold is just a point and thus the anchor map (and $D$) are trivial.

The example described in the paper by Weinstein et al. comes from a Lie bialgebroid: if $A$ is a Lie algebroid (with anchor $\rho_A$ and bracket $[.,.]_A$), also its dual $A^*$ is a Lie algebroid (inducing the differential $d_{A^*}$ on $\wedge^* A$) and $d_{A^*}[X,Y]_A=[d_{A^*}X,Y]_A+[X,d_{A^*}Y]_A$ (where on the right-hand side you extend the $A$-bracket to $\wedge^*A$ using graded Leibniz rule). This notion is symmetric in $A$ and $A^*$ (see Roytenberg). Here $E=A\oplus A^*$ with anchor $\rho(X+\alpha)=\rho_A(X)+\rho_{A^*}(\alpha)$ and the bracket is the skew-symmetrization of the above in $X$ and $\alpha$ (equivalently in $Y$ and $\beta$):

$$[X+\alpha,Y+\beta]= ([X,Y]_A +\mathcal{L}^{A^*}_{\alpha}Y-\iota_\beta d_{A^*}X) +([\alpha,\beta]_{A^*} +\mathcal{L}^A_X\beta-\iota_Yd_{A}\alpha)$$.

== Dirac structures ==
Given a Courant algebroid with the inner product $\langle \cdot, \cdot \rangle$ of split signature (e.g. the standard one $TM\oplus T^*M$), a Dirac structure is a maximally isotropic integrable vector subbundle $L \to M$, i.e.

$$\langle L,L\rangle \equiv 0$$,

$$\mathrm{rk}\,L=\tfrac12\mathrm{rk}\,E$$,

$$[\Gamma L,\Gamma L]\subset \Gamma L$$.

=== Examples ===
As discovered by Courant and parallel by Dorfman, the graph of a 2-form $\omega \in \Omega^2(M)$ is maximally isotropic and moreover integrable if and only if $d \omega = 0$, i.e. the 2-form is closed under the de Rham differential, i.e. is a presymplectic structure.

A second class of examples arises from bivectors $\Pi\in\Gamma(\wedge^2 TM)$ whose graph is maximally isotropic and integrable if and only if $[\Pi,\Pi] = 0$, i.e. $\rho$ is a Poisson bivector on $M$.

== Generalized complex structures ==
Given a Courant algebroid with inner product of split signature, a generalized complex structure $L \to M$ is a Dirac structure in the complexified Courant algebroid with the additional property

$$L \cap \bar{L} = 0$$

where $\bar{\ }$ means complex conjugation with respect to the standard complex structure on the complexification.

As studied in detail by Gualtieri, the generalized complex structures permit the study of geometry analogous to complex geometry.

=== Examples ===
Examples are, besides presymplectic and Poisson structures, also the graph of a complex structure $J: TM \to TM$.
