= Hopf problem =

Does the six sphere have a complex structure

The question of whether the 6-dimensional sphere S^{6} has a complex structure is known as the Hopf problem, after Heinz Hopf. S^{6}, when considered as the set of imaginary octonions, with unit norm, inherits an almost complex structure from octonion multiplication, but this is not a complex structure.

In August 2026, Levent Alpöge posted a 108-page paper generated using an internal version of the AI large language model Claude, outlining a direct geometric construction of a complex structure on S^{6}. Boris Alexeev formalized parts of the proof using the Lean proof assistant, and peer reconstruction efforts have found the construction plausible, though community scrutiny continues due to the history of failed attempts on this problem since 1947.
