= Symplectic resolution =

Mathematical concept

In mathematics, particularly in representation theory, a symplectic resolution is a morphism that combines symplectic geometry and resolution of singularities.

Let $\pi: Y \to X$ be a morphism between complex algebraic varieties, where $Y$ is smooth and carries a symplectic structure, and $X$ is affine, normal, and carries a Poisson structure. Then $\pi$ is a symplectic resolution if and only if $\pi$ is projective, birational, and Poisson.

A conical symplectic resolution is one that is equipped with compatible actions of $\mathbb{C}^\times$ on both $X$ and $Y$. Under these actions, $X$ contracts to a single point (denoted 0), the symplectic form is scaled with weight 2, and the morphism $\pi$ is compatible with these actions. The core of a conical symplectic resolution is defined as the central fiber $F_0 = \pi^{-1}(0)$. A conical symplectic resolution is Hamiltonian if it possesses Hamiltonian actions of a torus $T$ on both $X$ and $Y$. In this case, the morphism $\pi$ must be $T$-equivariant, with the $T$ action commuting with the conical $\mathbb{C}^\times$ action. Additionally, the fixed point set $Y^T$ must be finite.

The study of symplectic resolutions emerged as a natural generalization of classical techniques in representation theory. During the 20th century, mathematicians investigated the representation theory of semisimple Lie algebras through geometric methods, especially flag varieties and their cotangent bundles. In the 21st century, this approach evolved more generally, with the traditional cotangent bundle of the flag variety replaced by symplectic resolutions. Correspondingly, the classical semisimple Lie algebra was replaced by the deformation quantization of the affine Poisson variety.
