= Ana Cannas da Silva =

Portuguese mathematician (born 1968)

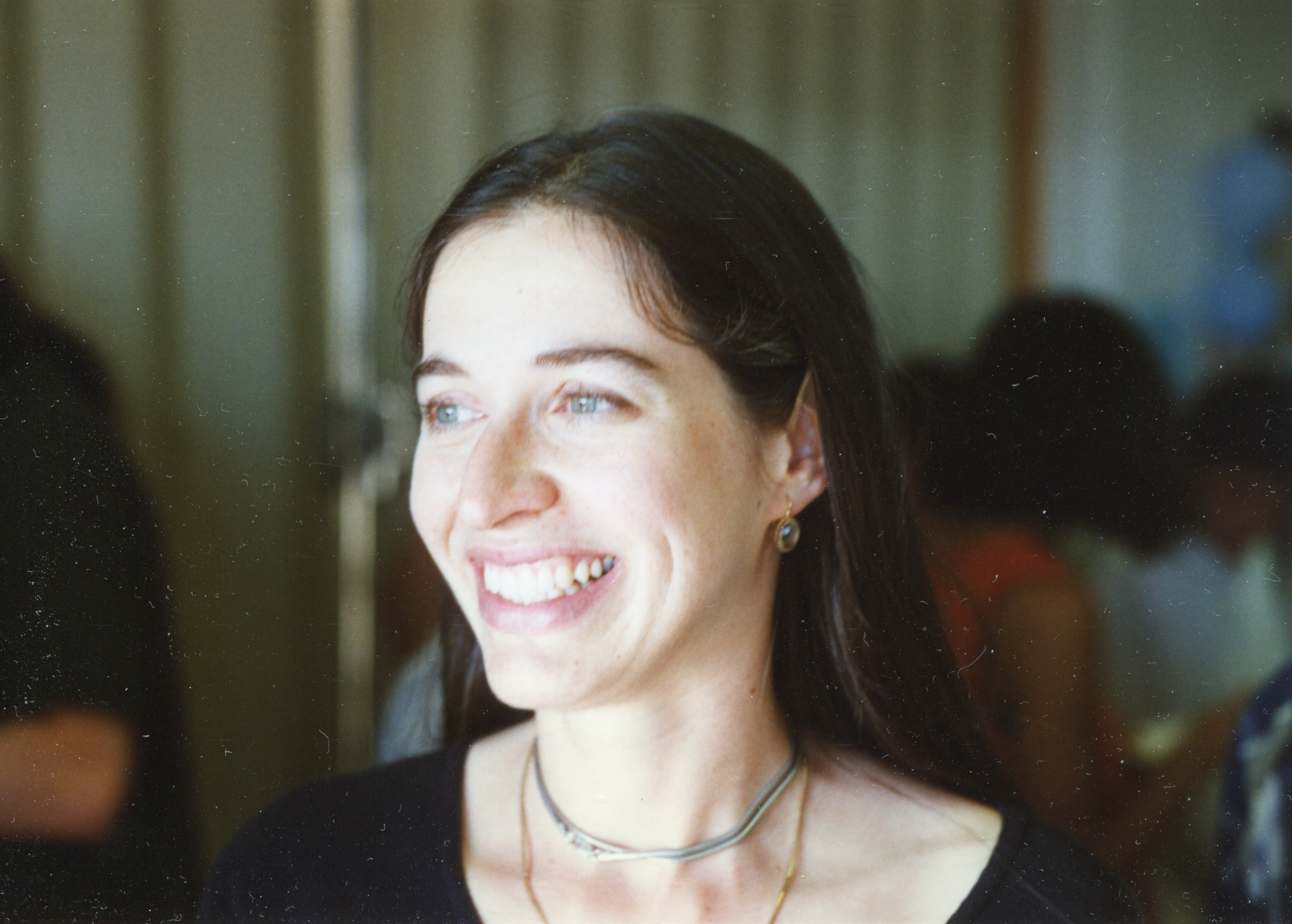
Ana Cannas da Silva in Berkeley, 1996

Ana M. L. G. Cannas da Silva (born 1968) is a Portuguese mathematician specializing in symplectic geometry and geometric topology. She works in Switzerland as a professor in mathematics at ETH Zurich.

== Early life and education ==
Cannas was born in Lisbon. After studying at St. John de Britto College, she earned a licentiate degree in mathematics in 1990 from the Instituto Superior Técnico in the University of Lisbon. She then went to the Massachusetts Institute of Technology for graduate studies, earning a master's degree in 1994 and completing her Ph.D. in 1996. Her dissertation, Multiplicity Formulas for Orbifolds, was supervised by Victor Guillemin.

== Career ==
After a temporary position as Morrey Assistant Professor at the University of California, Berkeley, Cannas returned to the Instituto Superior Técnico as a faculty member in 1997. She took a second position as a senior lecturer and research scholar in mathematics at Princeton University in 2006, keeping at the same time her position at the Instituto Superior Técnico. In 2011 she moved from Princeton and the Instituto Superior Técnico to ETH Zurich.

== Recognition ==
In 2009, the alumni of St. John de Britto College awarded Cannas their José Carlos Belchior Prize in honor of her achievements as an alumna of the school.

== Personal life ==
Cannas is married to mathematician Rahul Pandharipande.

== Books ==
Cannas is the author or coauthor of:

- Geometric Models for Noncommutative Algebras (with Alan Weinstein, Amer. Math. Soc., 1999)
- Lectures on Symplectic Geometry (Springer, 2001)
- Introduction to Symplectic and Hamiltonian Geometry (Publ. Mat. IMPA, 2003)
- Symplectic Geometry of Integrable Hamiltonian Systems (with Michèle Audin and Eugene Lerman, Birkhäuser 2003)
