= Lie bialgebroid =

Mathematical structure in non-Riemannian differential geometry

In differential geometry, a field in mathematics, a Lie bialgebroid consists of two compatible Lie algebroids defined on dual vector bundles. Lie bialgebroids are the vector bundle version of Lie bialgebras.

== Definition ==
=== Preliminary notions ===
A Lie algebroid consists of a bilinear skew-symmetric operation $[\cdot,\cdot]$ on the sections $\Gamma(A)$ of a vector bundle $A \to M$ over a smooth manifold $M$, together with a vector bundle morphism $\rho: A \to TM$ subject to the Leibniz rule

$$[\phi,f\cdot\psi] = \rho(\phi)[f]\cdot\psi +f\cdot[\phi,\psi],$$

and Jacobi identity

$$[\phi,[\psi_1,\psi_2]] = [[\phi,\psi_1],\psi_2] +[\psi_1,[\phi,\psi_2]]$$

where $\phi,\psi_k$ are sections of $A$ and $f$ is a smooth function on $M$.

The Lie bracket $[\cdot,\cdot]_A$ can be extended to multivector fields $\Gamma(\wedge A)$ graded symmetric via the Leibniz rule

$$[\Phi\wedge\Psi,\Chi]_A = \Phi\wedge[\Psi,\Chi]_A +(-1)^{|\Psi|(|\Chi|-1)}[\Phi,\Chi]_A\wedge\Psi$$

for homogeneous multivector fields $\phi, \psi, X$.

The Lie algebroid differential is an $\mathbb{R}$-linear operator $d_A$ on the $A$-forms $\Omega_A (M) = \Gamma (\wedge A^*)$ of degree 1 subject to the Leibniz rule

$$d_A(\alpha\wedge\beta) = (d_A\alpha)\wedge\beta +(-1)^{|\alpha|}\alpha\wedge d_A\beta$$

for $A$-forms $\alpha$ and $\beta$. It is uniquely characterized by the conditions

$$(d_Af)(\phi) = \rho(\phi)[f]$$

and

$$(d_A\alpha)[\phi,\psi] = \rho(\phi)[\alpha(\psi)] -\rho(\psi)[\alpha(\phi)] -\alpha[\phi,\psi]$$

for functions $f$ on $M$, $A$-1-forms $\alpha \in \Gamma(A^*)$ and $\phi, \psi$ sections of $A$.

=== The definition ===
A Lie bialgebroid consists of two Lie algebroids $(A,\rho_A,[\cdot,\cdot]_A)$ and $(A^*,\rho_*,[\cdot,\cdot]_*)$ on the dual vector bundles $A \to M$ and $A^* \to M$, subject to the compatibility

$$d_*[\phi,\psi]_A = [d_*\phi,\psi]_A +[\phi,d_*\psi]_A$$

for all sections $\phi, \psi$ of $A$. Here $d_*$ denotes the Lie algebroid differential of $A^*$ which also operates on the multivector fields $\Gamma(\wedge A)$.

=== Symmetry of the definition ===
It can be shown that the definition is symmetric in $A$ and $A^*$, i.e. $(A,A^*)$ is a Lie bialgebroid if and only if $(A^*,A)$ is.

== Examples ==
1. A Lie bialgebra consists of two Lie algebras $(\mathfrak{g},[\cdot,\cdot]_{\mathfrak{g}})$ and $(\mathfrak{g}^*,[\cdot,\cdot]_*)$ on dual vector spaces $\mathfrak{g}$ and $\mathfrak{g}^*$ such that the Chevalley–Eilenberg differential $\delta_*$ is a derivation of the $\mathfrak{g}$-bracket.
2. A Poisson manifold $(M,\pi)$ gives naturally rise to a Lie bialgebroid on $TM$ (with the commutator bracket of tangent vector fields) and $T^*M$ (with the Lie bracket induced by the Poisson structure). The $T^*M$-differential is $d_* = [\pi,\cdot]$ and the compatibility follows then from the Jacobi identity of the Schouten bracket.

== Infinitesimal version of a Poisson groupoid ==
It is well known that the infinitesimal version of a Lie groupoid is a Lie algebroid (as a special case, the infinitesimal version of a Lie group is a Lie algebra). Therefore, one can ask which structures need to be differentiated in order to obtain a Lie bialgebroid.

=== Definition of Poisson groupoid ===
A Poisson groupoid is a Lie groupoid $G \rightrightarrows M$ together with a Poisson structure $\pi$ on $G$ such that the graph $m \subset G \times G \times (G,-\pi)$ of the multiplication map is coisotropic. An example of a Poisson-Lie groupoid is a Poisson-Lie group (where $M$ is a point). Another example is a symplectic groupoid (where the Poisson structure is non-degenerate on $TG$).

=== Differentiation of the structure ===
Remember the construction of a Lie algebroid from a Lie groupoid. We take the $t$-tangent fibers (or equivalently the $s$-tangent fibers) and consider their vector bundle pulled back to the base manifold $M$. A section of this vector bundle can be identified with a $G$-invariant $t$-vector field on $G$ which form a Lie algebra with respect to the commutator bracket on $TG$.

We thus take the Lie algebroid $A \to M$ of the Poisson groupoid. It can be shown that the Poisson structure induces a fiber-linear Poisson structure on $A$. Analogous to the construction of the cotangent Lie algebroid of a Poisson manifold there is a Lie algebroid structure on $A^*$ induced by this Poisson structure. Analogous to the Poisson manifold case one can show that $A$ and $A^*$ form a Lie bialgebroid.

== Double of a Lie bialgebroid and superlanguage of Lie bialgebroids ==
For Lie bialgebras $(\mathfrak{g},\mathfrak{g}^*)$ there is the notion of Manin triples, i.e. $c = \mathfrak{g} + \mathfrak{g}^*$ can be endowed with the structure of a Lie algebra such that $\mathfrak{g}$ and $\mathfrak{g}^*$ are subalgebras and $c$ contains the representation of $\mathfrak{g}$ on $\mathfrak{g}^*$, vice versa. The sum structure is just

$$[X+\alpha,Y+\beta] = [X,Y]_g +\mathrm{ad}_\alpha Y -\mathrm{ad}_\beta X
+[\alpha,\beta]_* +\mathrm{ad}^*_X\beta -\mathrm{ad}^*_Y\alpha$$.

=== Courant algebroids ===
It turns out that the naive generalization to Lie algebroids does not give a Lie algebroid any more. Instead one has to modify either the Jacobi identity or violate the skew-symmetry and is thus lead to Courant algebroids.

=== Superlanguage ===
The appropriate superlanguage of a Lie algebroid $A$ is $\Pi A$, the supermanifold whose space of (super)functions are the $A$-forms. On this space the Lie algebroid can be encoded via its Lie algebroid differential, which is just an odd vector field.

As a first guess the super-realization of a Lie bialgebroid $(A,A^*)$ should be $\Pi A + \Pi A^*$. But unfortunately $d_A + d_*|\Pi A + \Pi A^*$ is not a differential, basically because $A + A^*$ is not a Lie algebroid. Instead using the larger N-graded manifold $T^*[2]A[1] = T^*[2]A^*[1]$ to which we can lift $d_A$ and $d_*$ as odd Hamiltonian vector fields, then their sum squares to $0$ iff $(A,A^*)$ is a Lie bialgebroid.
