= Quaternionic manifold =

Concept in geometry

In differential geometry, a quaternionic manifold is a quaternionic analog of a complex manifold. The definition is more complicated and technical than the one for complex manifolds due in part to the noncommutativity of the quaternions and in part to the lack of a suitable calculus of holomorphic functions for quaternions. The most succinct definition uses the language of G-structures on a manifold. Specifically, a quaternionic n-manifold can be defined as a smooth manifold of real dimension 4n equipped with a torsion-free $\operatorname{GL}(n, \mathbb{H})\cdot\mathbb{H}^\times$-structure. More naïve, but straightforward, definitions lead to a dearth of examples, and exclude spaces like quaternionic projective space which should clearly be considered as quaternionic manifolds.

== Early history ==
Marcel Berger's 1955 paper on the classification of Riemannian holonomy groups first raised the issue of the existence of non-symmetric manifolds with holonomy Sp(n)·Sp(1).Interesting results were proved in the mid-1960s in pioneering work by Edmond Bonan and Kraines who have independently proven that any such manifold admits a parallel 4-form $\Omega$.The long-awaited analog of strong Lefschetz theorem was published in 1982 : $\Omega^{n-k}\wedge\bigwedge^{2k}T^*M=\bigwedge^{4n-2k}T^*M.$

== Definitions ==
=== The enhanced quaternionic general linear group ===
If we regard the quaternionic vector space $\mathbb{H}^n\cong\R^{4n}$ as a right $\mathbb{H}$-module, we can identify the algebra of right $\mathbb{H}$-linear maps with the algebra of $n\times n$ quaternionic matrices acting on $\mathbb{H}^n$ from the left. The invertible right $\mathbb{H}$-linear maps then form a subgroup $\operatorname{GL}(n, \mathbb{H})$ of $\operatorname{GL}(4n, \R)$. We can enhance this group with the group $\mathbb{H}^\times$ of nonzero quaternions acting by scalar multiplication on $\mathbb{H}^n$ from the right. Since this scalar multiplication is $\R$-linear (but not $\mathbb{H}$-linear) we have another embedding of $\mathbb{H}^\times$ into $\operatorname{GL}(4n, \R)$. The group $\operatorname{GL}(n, \mathbb{H})\cdot\mathbb{H}^\times$ is then defined as the product of these subgroups in $\operatorname{GL}(4n, \R)$. Since the intersection of the subgroups $\operatorname{GL}(n, \mathbb{H})$ and $\mathbb{H}^\times$ in $\operatorname{GL}(4n, \R)$ is their mutual center $\R^\times$ (the group of scalar matrices with nonzero real coefficients), we have the isomorphism

$$\operatorname{GL}(n, \mathbb{H})\cdot\mathbb{H}^\times \cong (\operatorname{GL}(n, \mathbb{H})\times\mathbb{H}^\times)/\R^\times.$$

=== Almost quaternionic structure ===
An almost quaternionic structure on a smooth manifold $M$ is just a $\operatorname{GL}(n, \mathbb{H})\cdot\mathbb{H}^\times$-structure on $M$. Equivalently, it can be defined as a subbundle $H$ of the endomorphism bundle $\operatorname{End}(TM)$ such that each fiber $H_x$ is isomorphic (as a real algebra) to the quaternion algebra $\mathbb{H}$. The subbundle $H$ is called the almost quaternionic structure bundle. A manifold equipped with an almost quaternionic structure is called an almost quaternionic manifold.

The quaternion structure bundle $H$ naturally admits a bundle metric coming from the quaternionic algebra structure, and, with this metric, $H$ splits into an orthogonal direct sum of vector bundles $H = L\oplus E$ where $L$ is the trivial line bundle through the identity operator, and $E$ is a rank-3 vector bundle corresponding to the purely imaginary quaternions. Neither the bundles $H$ or $E$ are necessarily trivial.

The unit sphere bundle $Z = S(E)$ inside $E$ corresponds to the pure unit imaginary quaternions. These are endomorphisms of the tangent spaces that square to −1. The bundle $Z$ is called the twistor space of the manifold $M$, and its properties are described in more detail below. Local sections of $Z$ are (locally defined) almost complex structures. There exists a neighborhood $U$ of every point $x$ in an almost quaternionic manifold $M$ with an entire 2-sphere of almost complex structures defined on $U$. One can always find $I, J, K\in\Gamma(Z|_U)$ such that

$$I^2 = J^2 = K^2 = IJK = -1$$

Note, however, that none of these operators may be extendable to all of $M$. That is, the bundle $Z$ may admit no global sections (e.g. this is the case with quaternionic projective space $\mathbb{HP}^n$). This is in marked contrast to the situation for complex manifolds, which always have a globally defined almost complex structure.

=== Quaternionic structure ===
A quaternionic structure on a smooth manifold $M$ is an almost quaternionic structure $Q$ which admits a torsion-free affine connection $\nabla$ preserving $Q$. Such a connection is never unique, and is not considered to be part of the quaternionic structure. A quaternionic manifold is a smooth manifold $M$ together with a quaternionic structure on $M$.

== Special cases and additional structures ==
=== Hypercomplex manifolds ===
A hypercomplex manifold is a quaternionic manifold with a torsion-free $\operatorname{GL}(n, \mathbb{H})$-structure. The reduction of the structure group to $\operatorname{GL}(n, \mathbb{H})$ is possible if and only if the almost quaternionic structure bundle $H\subset \operatorname{End}(TM)$ is trivial (i.e. isomorphic to $M\times\mathbb{H}$). An almost hypercomplex structure corresponds to a global frame of $H$, or, equivalently, triple of almost complex structures $I, J$, and $K$ such that

$$I^2 = J^2 = K^2 = IJK = -1$$

A hypercomplex structure is an almost hypercomplex structure such that each of $I, J$, and $K$ are integrable.

=== Quaternionic Kähler manifolds ===
A quaternionic Kähler manifold is a quaternionic manifold with a torsion-free $\operatorname{Sp}(n)\cdot\operatorname{Sp}(1)$-structure.

=== Hyperkähler manifolds ===
A hyperkähler manifold is a quaternionic manifold with a torsion-free $\operatorname{Sp}(n)$-structure. A hyperkähler manifold is simultaneously a hypercomplex manifold and a quaternionic Kähler manifold.

== Twistor space ==
Given a quaternionic $n$-manifold $M$, the unit 2-sphere subbundle $Z=S(E)$ corresponding to the pure unit imaginary quaternions (or almost complex structures) is called the twistor space of $M$. It turns out that, when $n\ge 2$, there exists a natural complex structure on $Z$ such that the fibers of the projection $Z\to M$ are isomorphic to $\mathbb{CP}^1$. When $n=1$, the space $Z$ admits a natural almost complex structure, but this structure is integrable only if the manifold is self-dual. It turns out that the quaternionic geometry on $M$ can be reconstructed entirely from holomorphic data on $Z$.

The twistor space theory gives a method of translating problems on quaternionic manifolds into problems on complex manifolds, which are much better understood, and amenable to methods from algebraic geometry. Unfortunately, the twistor space of a quaternionic manifold can be quite complicated, even for simple spaces like $\mathbb{H}^n$.
