= Theodore James Courant =

American mathematician

Theodore James "Ted" Courant is an American mathematician who has conducted research in the fields of differential geometry and classical mechanics. In particular, he made seminal contributions to the study of Dirac manifolds, which generalize both symplectic manifolds and Poisson manifolds, and are related to the Dirac theory of constraints in physics. Some mathematical objects in this field have since been named after him, including the Courant bracket and Courant algebroid.

== Education and career ==
Courant received his B.A. degree from Reed College, and his Ph.D. from The University of California, Berkeley, where he was a student of Alan Weinstein.

After teaching at the University of California, Santa Cruz and the University of Minnesota, Courant moved to secondary education at private schools in California including The Branson School and Wildwood School.

== Personal life ==
Ted Courant is the grandson of Richard Courant.
