= Complex dimension =

In mathematics, complex dimension usually refers to the dimension of a complex manifold or a complex algebraic variety. These are spaces in which the local neighborhoods of points (or of non-singular points in the case of a variety) are modeled on a Cartesian product of the form $\mathbb{C}^d$ for some $d$, and the complex dimension is the exponent $d$ in this product. Because $\mathbb{C}$ can in turn be modeled by $\mathbb{R}^2$, a space with complex dimension $d$ will have real dimension $2d$. That is, a smooth manifold of complex dimension $d$ has real dimension $2d$; and a complex algebraic variety of complex dimension $d$, away from any singular point, will also be a smooth manifold of real dimension $2d$.

However, for a real algebraic variety (that is a variety defined by equations with real coefficients), its dimension refers commonly to its complex dimension, and its real dimension refers to the maximum of the dimensions of the manifolds contained in the set of its real points. The real dimension is not greater than the dimension, and equals it if the variety is irreducible and has real points that are nonsingular. For example, the equation $x^2+y^2+z^2=0$ defines a variety of (complex) dimension 2 (a surface), but of real dimension 0 — it has only one real point, (0, 0, 0), which is singular.

The same considerations apply to codimension. For example a smooth complex hypersurface in complex projective space of dimension n will be a manifold of dimension 2(n − 1). A complex hyperplane does not separate a complex projective space into two components, because it has real codimension 2.
