= Generalized complex structure =

Property of a differential manifold that includes complex structures

In the field of mathematics known as differential geometry, a generalized complex structure is a property of a differential manifold that includes as special cases a complex structure and a symplectic structure. Generalized complex structures were introduced by Nigel Hitchin in 2002 and further developed by his students Marco Gualtieri and Gil Cavalcanti.

These structures first arose in Hitchin's program of characterizing geometrical structures via functionals of differential forms, a connection which formed the basis of Robbert Dijkgraaf, Sergei Gukov, Andrew Neitzke and Cumrun Vafa's 2004 proposal that topological string theories are special cases of a topological M-theory. Today generalized complex structures also play a leading role in physical string theory, as supersymmetric flux compactifications, which relate 10-dimensional physics to 4-dimensional worlds like ours, require (possibly twisted) generalized complex structures.

== Definition ==
=== The generalized tangent bundle ===
Consider an N-manifold M. The tangent bundle of M, which will be denoted T, is the vector bundle over M whose fibers consist of all tangent vectors to M. A section of T is a vector field on M. The cotangent bundle of M, denoted T^{*}, is the vector bundle over M whose sections are one-forms on M.

In complex geometry one considers structures on the tangent bundles of manifolds. In symplectic geometry one is instead interested in exterior powers of the cotangent bundle. Generalized geometry unites these two fields by treating sections of the generalized tangent bundle, which is the direct sum $\mathbf{T} \oplus \mathbf{T}^*$ of the tangent and cotangent bundles, which are formal sums of a vector field and a one-form.

The fibers are endowed with a natural inner product with signature (N, N). If X and Y are vector fields and ξ and η are one-forms then the inner product of X+ξ and Y+η is defined as

$$\langle X+\xi,Y+\eta\rangle=\frac{1}{2}(\xi(Y)+\eta(X)).$$

A generalized almost complex structure is just an almost complex structure of the generalized tangent bundle which preserves the natural inner product:

$${\mathcal J}: \mathbf{T}\oplus\mathbf{T}^*\to \mathbf{T}\oplus\mathbf{T}^*$$

such that ${\mathcal J}^2=-{\rm Id},$ and

$$\langle {\mathcal J}(X+\xi),{\mathcal J}(Y+\eta)\rangle=\langle X+\xi, Y+\eta \rangle.$$

Like in the case of an ordinary almost complex structure, a generalized almost complex structure is uniquely determined by its $\sqrt{-1}$-eigenbundle, i.e. a subbundle $L$ of the complexified generalized tangent bundle $(\mathbf{T}\oplus\mathbf{T}^*)\otimes\Complex$ given by

$$L=\{X+\xi\in (\mathbf{T}\oplus\mathbf{T}^*)\otimes\Complex \ :\ {\mathcal J}(X+\xi)=\sqrt{-1}(X+\xi)\}$$

Such subbundle L satisfies the following properties:

1. the intersection with its complex conjugate is the zero section: $L\cap\overline{L}=0$;
2. L is maximal isotropic, i.e. its complex rank equals N and $\langle\ell, \ell' \rangle =0$ for all $\ell,\ell'\in L.$

Vice versa, any subbundle L satisfying (i), (ii) is the $\sqrt{-1}$-eigenbundle of a unique generalized almost complex structure, so that the properties (i), (ii) can be considered as an alternative definition of generalized almost complex structure.

=== Courant bracket ===
In ordinary complex geometry, an almost complex structure is integrable to a complex structure if and only if the Lie bracket of two sections of the holomorphic subbundle is another section of the holomorphic subbundle.

In generalized complex geometry one is not interested in vector fields, but rather in the formal sums of vector fields and one-forms. A kind of Lie bracket for such formal sums was introduced in 1990 and is called the Courant bracket which is defined by

$$[X+\xi,Y+\eta]=[X,Y] +\mathcal{L}_X\eta-\mathcal{L}_Y\xi -\frac{1}{2}d(i(X)\eta-i(Y)\xi)$$

where $\mathcal{L}_X$ is the Lie derivative along the vector field X, d is the exterior derivative and i is the interior product.

=== Definition ===
A generalized complex structure is a generalized almost complex structure such that the space of smooth sections of L is closed under the Courant bracket.

== Maximal isotropic subbundles ==
=== Classification ===
There is a one-to-one correspondence between maximal isotropic subbundle of $\mathbf{T} \oplus \mathbf{T}^*$ and pairs $(\mathbf{E}, \varepsilon)$ where E is a subbundle of T and $\varepsilon$ is a 2-form. This correspondence extends straightforwardly to the complex case.

Given a pair $(\mathbf{E}, \varepsilon)$ one can construct a maximally isotropic subbundle $L(\mathbf{E}, \varepsilon)$ of $\mathbf{T} \oplus \mathbf{T}^*$ as follows. The elements of the subbundle are the formal sums $X+\xi$ where the vector field X is a section of E and the one-form ξ restricted to the dual space $\mathbf{E}^*$ is equal to the one-form $\varepsilon(X).$

To see that $L(\mathbf{E}, \varepsilon)$ is isotropic, notice that if Y is a section of E and $\xi$ restricted to $\mathbf{E}^*$ is $\varepsilon(X)$ then $\xi(Y) =\varepsilon(X,Y),$ as the part of $\xi$ orthogonal to $\mathbf{E}^*$ annihilates Y. Therefore if $X+\xi$ and $Y+\eta$ are sections of $\mathbf{T} \oplus \mathbf{T}^*$ then

$$\langle X+\xi,Y+\eta\rangle=\frac{1}{2}(\xi(Y)+\eta(X))=\frac{1}{2}(\varepsilon(Y,X)+\varepsilon(X,Y))=0$$

and so $L(\mathbf{E}, \varepsilon)$ is isotropic. Furthermore, $L(\mathbf{E}, \varepsilon)$ is maximal because there are $\dim(\mathbf{E})$ (complex) dimensions of choices for $\mathbf{E},$ and $\varepsilon$ is unrestricted on the complement of $\mathbf{E}^*,$ which is of (complex) dimension $n-\dim(\mathbf{E}).$ Thus the total (complex) dimension is n. Gualtieri has proven that all maximal isotropic subbundles are of the form $L(\mathbf{E}, \varepsilon)$ for some $\mathbf{E}$ and $\varepsilon.$

=== Type ===
The type of a maximal isotropic subbundle $L(\mathbf{E}, \varepsilon)$ is the real dimension of the subbundle that annihilates E. Equivalently it is 2N minus the real dimension of the projection of $L(\mathbf{E}, \varepsilon)$ onto the tangent bundle T. In other words, the type of a maximal isotropic subbundle is the codimension of its projection onto the tangent bundle. In the complex case one uses the complex dimension and the type is sometimes referred to as the complex type. While the type of a subbundle can in principle be any integer between 0 and 2N, generalized almost complex structures cannot have a type greater than N because the sum of the subbundle and its complex conjugate must be all of $(\mathbf{T} \oplus \mathbf{T}^*) \otimes \Complex.$

The type of a maximal isotropic subbundle is invariant under diffeomorphisms and also under shifts of the B-field, which are isometries of $\mathbf{T} \oplus \mathbf{T}^*$ of the form

$$X+\xi\longrightarrow X+\xi+i_XB$$

where B is an arbitrary closed 2-form called the B-field in the string theory literature.

The type of a generalized almost complex structure is in general not constant, it can jump by any even integer. However it is upper semi-continuous, which means that each point has an open neighborhood in which the type does not increase. In practice this means that subsets of greater type than the ambient type occur on submanifolds with positive codimension.

=== Real index ===
The real index r of a maximal isotropic subspace L is the complex dimension of the intersection of L with its complex conjugate. A maximal isotropic subspace of $(\mathbf{T} \oplus \mathbf{T}^*) \otimes \Complex$ is a generalized almost complex structure if and only if r = 0.

== Canonical bundle ==
As in the case of ordinary complex geometry, there is a correspondence between generalized almost complex structures and complex line bundles. The complex line bundle corresponding to a particular generalized almost complex structure is often referred to as the canonical bundle, as it generalizes the canonical bundle in the ordinary case. It is sometimes also called the pure spinor bundle, as its sections are pure spinors.

=== Generalized almost complex structures ===
The canonical bundle is a one complex dimensional subbundle of the bundle $\mathbf{\Lambda}^* \mathbf{T} \otimes \Complex$ of complex differential forms on M. Recall that the gamma matrices define an isomorphism between differential forms and spinors. In particular even and odd forms map to the two chiralities of Weyl spinors. Vectors have an action on differential forms given by the interior product. One-forms have an action on forms given by the wedge product. Thus sections of the bundle $(\mathbf{T} \oplus \mathbf{T}^*) \otimes \Complex$ act on differential forms. This action is a representation of the action of the Clifford algebra on spinors.

A spinor is said to be a pure spinor if it is annihilated by half of a set of generators of the Clifford algebra. Spinors are sections of our bundle $\mathbf{\Lambda}^* \mathbf{T},$ and generators of the Clifford algebra are the fibers of our other bundle $(\mathbf{T} \oplus \mathbf{T}^*) \otimes \Complex.$ Therefore, a given pure spinor is annihilated by a half-dimensional subbundle E of $(\mathbf{T} \oplus \mathbf{T}^*) \otimes \Complex.$ Such subbundles are always isotropic, so to define an almost complex structure one must only impose that the sum of E and its complex conjugate is all of $(\mathbf{T} \oplus \mathbf{T}^*) \otimes \Complex.$ This is true whenever the wedge product of the pure spinor and its complex conjugate contains a top-dimensional component. Such pure spinors determine generalized almost complex structures.

Given a generalized almost complex structure, one can also determine a pure spinor up to multiplication by an arbitrary complex function. These choices of pure spinors are defined to be the sections of the canonical bundle.

=== Integrability and other structures ===
If a pure spinor that determines a particular complex structure is closed, or more generally if its exterior derivative is equal to the action of a gamma matrix on itself, then the almost complex structure is integrable and so such pure spinors correspond to generalized complex structures.

If one further imposes that the canonical bundle is holomorphically trivial, meaning that it is global sections which are closed forms, then it defines a generalized Calabi-Yau structure and M is said to be a generalized Calabi-Yau manifold.

== Local classification ==
=== Canonical bundle ===
Locally all pure spinors can be written in the same form, depending on an integer k, the B-field 2-form B, a nondegenerate symplectic form ω and a k-form Ω. In a local neighborhood of any point a pure spinor Φ which generates the canonical bundle may always be put in the form

$$\Phi=e^{B+i\omega}\Omega$$

where Ω is decomposable as the wedge product of one-forms.

=== Regular point ===
Define the subbundle E of the complexified tangent bundle $\mathbf{T} \otimes \Complex$ to be the projection of the holomorphic subbundle L of $(\mathbf{T} \oplus \mathbf{T}^*) \otimes \Complex$ to $\mathbf{T} \otimes \Complex.$ In the definition of a generalized almost complex structure we have imposed that the intersection of L and its conjugate contains only the origin, otherwise they would be unable to span the entirety of $(\mathbf{T} \oplus \mathbf{T}^*) \otimes \Complex.$ However the intersection of their projections need not be trivial. In general this intersection is of the form

$$E\cap\overline{E}=\Delta\otimes\Complex$$

for some subbundle Δ. A point which has an open neighborhood in which the dimension of the fibers of Δ is constant is said to be a regular point.

=== Darboux's theorem ===
Every regular point in a generalized complex manifold has an open neighborhood which, after a diffeomorphism and shift of the B-field, has the same generalized complex structure as the Cartesian product of the complex vector space $\Complex^k$ and the standard symplectic space $\R^{2n-2k}$ with the standard symplectic form, which is the direct sum of the two by two off-diagonal matrices with entries 1 and −1.

=== Local holomorphicity ===
Near non-regular points, the above classification theorem does not apply. However, about any point, a generalized complex manifold is, up to diffeomorphism and B-field, a product of a symplectic manifold with a generalized complex manifold which is of complex type at the point, much like Weinstein's theorem for the local structure of Poisson manifolds. The remaining question of the local structure is: what does a generalized complex structure look like near a point of complex type? In fact, it will be induced by a holomorphic Poisson structure.

== Examples ==
=== Complex manifolds ===
The space of complex differential forms $\mathbf{\Lambda}^* \mathbf{T} \otimes \Complex$ has a complex conjugation operation given by complex conjugation in $\Complex.$ This allows one to define holomorphic and antiholomorphic one-forms and (m, n)-forms, which are homogeneous polynomials in these one-forms with m holomorphic factors and n antiholomorphic factors. In particular, all (n, 0)-forms are related locally by multiplication by a complex function and so they form a complex line bundle.

(n, 0)-forms are pure spinors, as they are annihilated by antiholomorphic tangent vectors and by holomorphic one-forms. Thus this line bundle can be used as a canonical bundle to define a generalized complex structure. Restricting the annihilator from $(\mathbf{T} \oplus \mathbf{T}^*) \otimes \Complex$ to the complexified tangent bundle one gets the subspace of antiholomorphic vector fields. Therefore, this generalized complex structure on $(\mathbf{T} \oplus \mathbf{T}^*) \otimes \Complex$ defines an ordinary complex structure on the tangent bundle.

As only half of a basis of vector fields are holomorphic, these complex structures are of type N. In fact complex manifolds, and the manifolds obtained by multiplying the pure spinor bundle defining a complex manifold by a complex, $\partial$-closed (2,0)-form, are the only type N generalized complex manifolds.

=== Symplectic manifolds ===
The pure spinor bundle generated by

$$\phi=e^{i\omega}$$

for a nondegenerate two-form ω defines a symplectic structure on the tangent space. Thus symplectic manifolds are also generalized complex manifolds.

The above pure spinor is globally defined, and so the canonical bundle is trivial. This means that symplectic manifolds are not only generalized complex manifolds but in fact are generalized Calabi-Yau manifolds.

The pure spinor $\phi$ is related to a pure spinor which is just a number by an imaginary shift of the B-field, which is a shift of the Kähler form. Therefore, these generalized complex structures are of the same type as those corresponding to a scalar pure spinor. A scalar is annihilated by the entire tangent space, and so these structures are of type 0.

Up to a shift of the B-field, which corresponds to multiplying the pure spinor by the exponential of a closed, real 2-form, symplectic manifolds are the only type 0 generalized complex manifolds. Manifolds which are symplectic up to a shift of the B-field are sometimes called B-symplectic.

== Relation to G-structures ==
Some of the almost structures in generalized complex geometry may be rephrased in the language of G-structures. The word "almost" is removed if the structure is integrable.

The bundle $(\mathbf{T} \oplus \mathbf{T}^*) \otimes \Complex$ with the above inner product is an O(2n, 2n) structure. A generalized almost complex structure is a reduction of this structure to a U(n, n) structure. Therefore, the space of generalized complex structures is the coset

$$\frac{O(2n,2n)}{U(n,n)}.$$

A generalized almost Kähler structure is a pair of commuting generalized complex structures such that minus the product of the corresponding tensors is a positive definite metric on $(\mathbf{T} \oplus \mathbf{T}^*) \otimes \Complex.$ Generalized Kähler structures are reductions of the structure group to $U(n) \times U(n).$ Generalized Kähler manifolds, and their twisted counterparts, are equivalent to the bihermitian manifolds discovered by Sylvester James Gates, Chris Hull and Martin Roček in the context of 2-dimensional supersymmetric quantum field theories in 1984.

Finally, a generalized almost Calabi-Yau metric structure is a further reduction of the structure group to $SU(n) \times SU(n).$

=== Calabi versus Calabi–Yau metric ===
Notice that a generalized Calabi metric structure, which was introduced by Marco Gualtieri, is a stronger condition than a generalized Calabi–Yau structure, which was introduced by Nigel Hitchin. In particular a generalized Calabi–Yau metric structure implies the existence of two commuting generalized almost complex structures.
