= Alan Weinstein =

American mathematician (born 1943)

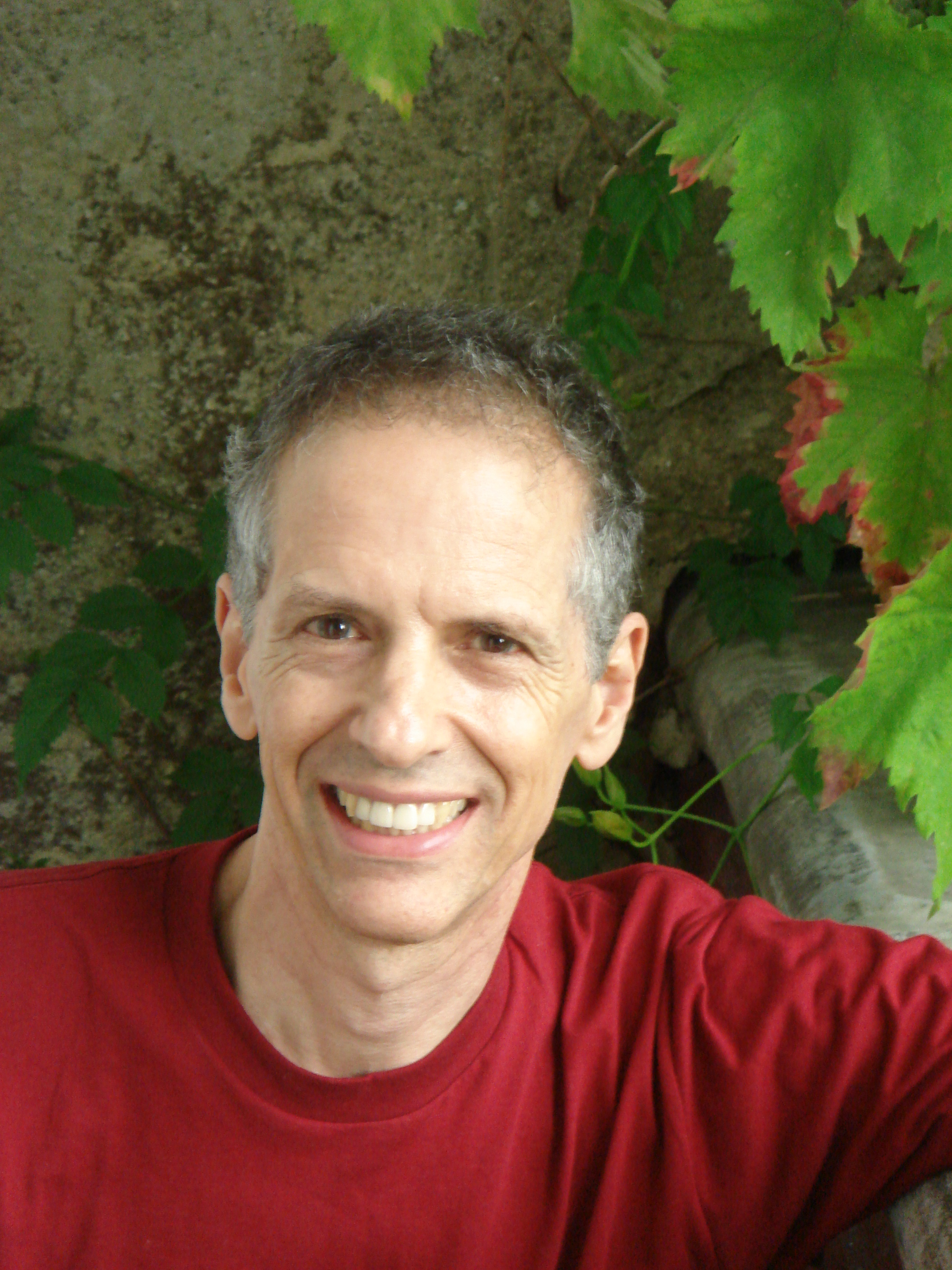
- Born: June 17, 1943 (age 83); New York, United States
- Education: University of California, Berkeley
- Known for: Weinstein conjecture Weinstein's neighbourhood theorem Weinstein's symplectic category Marsden–Weinstein quotient Courant algebroid Symplectic groupoid
- Awards: Sloan Research Fellowship (1971); ICM Speaker (1978); Guggenheim Fellowship (1985)
- Scientific career
- Fields: Mathematics
- Thesis: The Cut Locus and Conjugate Locus of a Riemannian Manifold (1967)
- Doctoral advisor: Shiing-Shen Chern
- Doctoral students: Theodore Courant; Viktor Ginzburg; Steve Omohundro; Steven Zelditch; Yong-Geun Oh; Chenchang Zhu

Alan David Weinstein (born 17 June 1943) is a professor of mathematics at the University of California, Berkeley, working in the field of differential geometry, and especially in Poisson geometry.

== Early life and education ==
Weinstein was born in New York City. After attending Roslyn High School, Weinstein obtained a bachelor's degree at the Massachusetts Institute of Technology in 1964. His teachers included, among others, James Munkres, Gian-Carlo Rota, Irving Segal, and, for the first senior course of differential geometry, Sigurður Helgason. He received a PhD at University of California, Berkeley in 1967 under the direction of Shiing-Shen Chern. His dissertation was entitled "The cut locus and conjugate locus of a Riemannian manifold".

== Career ==
Weinstein worked then at MIT on 1967 (as Moore instructor) and at Bonn University in 1968/69. In 1969 he returned to Berkeley as assistant professor and from 1976 he is full professor. During 1975/76 he visited IHES in Paris and during 1978/79 he was visiting professor at Rice University. Weinstein was awarded in 1971 a Sloan Research Fellowship and in 1985 a Guggenheim Fellowship. In 1978 he was invited speaker at the International Congress of Mathematicians in Helsinki. In 1992 he was elected Fellow of the American Academy of Arts and Sciences and in 2012 Fellow of the American Mathematical Society. In 2003 he was awarded an honorary doctorate from Universiteit Utrecht.

== Research ==
Weinstein's works cover many areas in differential geometry and mathematical physics, including Riemannian geometry, symplectic geometry, Lie groupoids, geometric mechanics and deformation quantization.

Among his most important contributions, in 1971 he proved a tubular neighbourhood theorem for Lagrangians in symplectic manifolds.

In 1974 he worked with Jerrold Marsden on the theory of reduction for mechanical systems with symmetries, introducing the famous Marsden–Weinstein quotient.

In 1978 he formulated a celebrated conjecture on the existence of periodic orbits, which has been later proved in several particular cases and has led to many new developments in symplectic and contact geometry.

In 1981 he formulated a general principle, called symplectic creed, stating that "everything is a Lagrangian submanifold". Such insight has been constantly quoted as the source of inspiration for many results in symplectic geometry.

Building on the work of André Lichnerowicz, in a 1983 foundational paper Weinstein proved many results which laid the ground for the development of modern Poisson geometry. A further influential idea in this field was its introduction of symplectic groupoids.

He is author of more than 50 research papers in peer-reviewed journals and he has supervised 35 PhD students.

== Books ==
- Geometric Models for Noncommutative Algebras (with A. Cannas da Silva), Berkeley Mathematics Lecture Notes series, American Mathematical Society (1999)
- Lectures on the Geometry of Quantization (with S. Bates), Berkeley Mathematics Lecture Notes series, American Mathematical Society (1997)
- Basic Multivariable Calculus (with J.E. Marsden and A.J. Tromba), W.A. Freeman and Company, Springer-Verlag (1993), ISBN 978-0-387-97976-2
- Calculus, I, II, III (with J.E. Marsden), 2nd ed., Springer-Verlag (1985), now out of print and free at CaltechAUTHORS.
- Calculus Unlimited (with J.E. Marsden), Benjamin/Cummings (1981), now out of print and free at CaltechAUTHORS.
