= Pure spinor =

Class of spinors constructed using Clifford algebras

In the domain of mathematics known as representation theory, pure spinors (or simple spinors) are spinors that are annihilated, under the Clifford algebra representation, by a maximal isotropic subspace of a vector space $V$ with respect to a scalar product $Q$. They were introduced by Élie Cartan in the 1930s and further developed by Claude Chevalley.

They are a key ingredient in the study of spin structures and higher dimensional generalizations of twistor theory, introduced by Roger Penrose in the 1960s. They have been applied to the study of supersymmetric Yang-Mills theory in 10D, superstrings, generalized complex structures and parametrizing solutions of integrable hierarchies.

== Clifford algebra and pure spinors ==
Consider a complex vector space $V$, with either even dimension $2n$ or odd dimension $2n+1$, and a nondegenerate complex scalar product $Q$, with values $Q(u,v)$ on pairs of vectors $(u, v)$. The Clifford algebra $Cl(V, Q)$ is the quotient of the full tensor algebra on $V$ by the ideal generated by the relations

$$u\otimes v + v \otimes u = 2 Q(u,v), \quad \forall \ u, v \in V.$$

Spinors are modules of the Clifford algebra, and so in particular there is an action of the elements of $V$ on the space of spinors. The complex subspace $V^0_\psi \subset V$ that annihilates a given nonzero spinor $\psi$ has dimension $m \le n$. If $m=n$ then $\psi$ is said to be a pure spinor. In terms of stratification of spinor modules by orbits of the spin group $Spin(V,Q)$, pure spinors correspond to the smallest orbits, which are the Shilov boundary of the stratification by the orbit types of the spinor representation on the irreducible spinor (or half-spinor) modules.

Pure spinors, defined up to projectivization, are called projective pure spinors. For $\,V\,$ of even dimension $2n$, the space of projective pure spinors is the homogeneous space $SO(2n)/U(n)$; for $\,V\,$ of odd dimension $2n+1$, it is $SO(2n+1)/U(n)$.

== Irreducible Clifford module, spinors, pure spinors and the Cartan map ==
=== The irreducible Clifford/spinor module ===
Following Cartan and Chevalley, we may view $V$ as a direct sum

$$V= V_n \oplus V_n^*\ \text{ or }\  V= V_n \oplus V_n^*\oplus\mathbf{C},$$

where $V_n\subset V$ is a totally isotropic subspace of dimension $n$, and $V^*_n$ is its dual space, with scalar product defined as

$$Q(v_1 + w_1,v_2 + w_2) := w_2(v_1) + w_1(v_2),\quad v_1, v_2 \in V_n, \  w_1, w_2 \in V^*_n,$$

or

$$Q(v_1 + w_1 + a_1,v_2 + w_2+a_2) := w_2(v_1) + w_1(v_2) + a_1 a_2,\quad a_1, a_2 \in \mathbf{C},$$

respectively.

The Clifford algebra representation $\Gamma_X \in \mathrm{End}(\Lambda(V_n))$ as endomorphisms of the irreducible Clifford/spinor module $\Lambda(V_n)$, is generated by the linear elements $X\in V$, which act as

$$\Gamma_v(\psi) = v \wedge \psi \ \text{ (wedge product) } \ \text {for } v \in V_n \ \text{ and }   \Gamma_w(\psi) = \iota(w) \psi \ \text{ (inner product) } \text{for}\ w \in V^*_n,$$

for either $V= V_n \oplus V_n^*$ or $V= V_n \oplus V_n^*\oplus\mathbf{C}$, and

$$\Gamma_a \psi = (-1)^p a\ \psi, \quad a \in \mathbf{C}, \  \psi \in \Lambda^p(V_n),$$

for $V= V_n \oplus V_n^*\oplus\mathbf{C}$, when $\psi$ is homogeneous of degree $p$.

=== Pure spinors and the Cartan map ===
A pure spinor $\psi$ is defined to be any element $\psi\in \Lambda (V_n)$ that is annihilated by a maximal isotropic subspace $w\subset V$ with respect to the scalar product $\,Q\,$. Conversely, given a maximal isotropic subspace it is possible to determine the pure spinor that annihilates it, up to multiplication by a complex number, as follows.

Denote the Grassmannian of maximal isotropic ($n$-dimensional) subspaces of $V$ as $\mathbf{Gr}^0_n(V, Q)$. The Cartan map

$$\mathbf{Ca}:  \mathbf{Gr}^0_n(V, Q)\rightarrow  \mathbf{P}(\Lambda (V_n))$$

is defined, for any element $w\in \mathbf{Gr}^0_n(V, Q)$, with basis $(X_1, \dots, X_n)$, to have value

$$\mathbf{Ca}(w): = \mathrm{Im}(\Gamma_{X_1}\cdots \Gamma_{X_n});$$

i.e. the image of $\Lambda (V_n)$ under the endomorphism formed from taking the product of the Clifford representation endomorphisms $\{\Gamma_{X_i} \in \mathrm{End}(\Lambda (V_n))\}_{i=1, \dots, n}$, which is independent of the choice of basis $(X_1, \cdots , X_n)$. This is a $1$-dimensional subspace, due to the isotropy conditions,

$$Q(X_i, X_j) =0, \quad 1\le i, j \le n,$$

which imply

$$\Gamma_{X_i} \Gamma_{X_j} + \Gamma_{X_j} \Gamma_{X_i}=0, \quad 1\le i, j \le n,$$

and hence $\mathbf{Ca}(w)$ defines an element of the projectivization $\mathbf{P}(\Lambda (V_n))$ of the irreducible Clifford module $\Lambda (V_n)$. It follows from the isotropy conditions that, if the projective class $[\psi]$ of a spinor $\psi \in \Lambda(V_n)$ is in the image $\mathbf{Ca}(w)$ and $X\in w$, then

$$\Gamma_X(\psi) =0.$$

So any spinor $\psi$ with $[\psi]\in \mathbf{Ca}(w)$ is annihilated, under the Clifford representation, by all elements of $w$. Conversely, if $\psi$ is annihilated by $\Gamma_X$ for all $X \in w$, then $[\psi]\in \mathbf{Ca}(w)$.

If $V = V_n \oplus V^*_n$ is even dimensional, there are two connected components in the isotropic Grassmannian $\mathbf{Gr}^0_n(V, Q)$, which get mapped, under $\mathbf{Ca}$, into the two half-spinor subspaces $\Lambda^+(V_n) , \Lambda^-(V_n)$ in the direct sum decomposition

$$\Lambda(V_n) =  \Lambda^+(V_n) \oplus \Lambda^-(V_n),$$

where $\Lambda^+(V_n)$ and $\Lambda^-(V_n)$ consist, respectively, of the even and odd degree elements of $\Lambda^(V_n)$ .

=== The Cartan relations ===
Define a set of bilinear forms $\{\beta_m\}_{m=0, \dots 2n}$ on the spinor module $\Lambda(V_n)$, with values in $\Lambda^m(V^*) \sim \Lambda^m(V)$ (which are isomorphic via the scalar product $Q$), by

$$\beta_m(\psi, \phi)(X_1, \dots, X_m)
:=\beta_0(\psi, \Gamma_{X_1} \cdots  \Gamma_{X_m} \phi), \quad\text{for }  \psi, \phi \in \Lambda(V_n),\ X_1, \dots, X_m \in V,$$

where, for homogeneous elements $\psi\in \Lambda^p(V_n)$, $\phi\in \Lambda^q(V_n)$ and volume form $\Omega$ on $\Lambda(V_n)$,

$$\beta_0(\psi, \phi)\,\Omega = \begin{cases}
\psi \wedge \phi  \quad \text{if }p+q = n \\
0 \quad \text{otherwise. }
\end{cases}$$

As shown by Cartan, pure spinors $\psi\in \Lambda(V_n)$ are uniquely determined by the fact that they satisfy the following set of homogeneous quadratic equations, known as the Cartan relations:

$$\beta_m(\psi, \psi) =0 \quad \forall\  m \equiv n \mod(4), \quad 0\le m <  n$$

on the standard irreducible spinor module.

These determine the image of the submanifold of maximal isotropic subspaces of the vector space $V,$ with respect to the scalar product $Q$, under the Cartan map, which defines an embedding of the Grassmannian of isotropic subspaces of $V$ in the projectivization of the spinor module (or half-spinor module, in the even dimensional case), realizing these as projective varieties.

There are therefore, in total,

$$\sum_{0\le m \le n-1 \atop m \equiv n, \text{ mod } 4} {\text{dim}(V) \choose m}$$

Cartan relations, signifying the vanishing of the bilinear forms $\beta_m$ with values in the exterior spaces $\,\Lambda^m(V)\,$ for $m \equiv n, \text{ mod } 4$, corresponding to these skew symmetric elements of the Clifford algebra. However, since the dimension of the Grassmannian of maximal isotropic subspaces of $\,V\,$ is $\,\tfrac{1}{2}\,n (n-1)\,$ when $\,V\,$ is of even dimension $2n$ and $\,\tfrac{1}{2}\,n (n+1)\,$ when $\,V\,$ has odd dimension $2n +1$, and the Cartan map is an embedding of the connected components of this in the projectivization of the half-spinor modules when $\,V\,$ is of even dimension and in the irreducible spinor module if it is of odd dimension, the number of independent quadratic constraints is only

$$2^{n-1} - \tfrac{1}{2}\,n(n-1) - 1$$

in the $\,2n\,$ dimensional case, and

$$2^n - \tfrac{1}{2}\,n(n+1) - 1$$

in the $\,2n + 1\,$ dimensional case.

In 6 dimensions or fewer, all spinors are pure. In 7 or 8 dimensions, there is a single pure spinor constraint. In 10 dimensions, there are 10 constraints

$$\psi \; \Gamma_\mu \, \psi = 0~, \quad \mu= 1, \dots, 10,$$

where $\,\Gamma_\mu\,$ are the Gamma matrices that represent the vectors in $\,\mathbb{C}^{10}\,$ that generate the Clifford algebra. However, only $5$ of these are independent, so the variety of projectivized pure spinors for $V =\mathbb{C}^{10}$ is $10$ (complex) dimensional.

== Applications of pure spinors ==
=== Supersymmetric Yang Mills theory ===
For $d=10$ dimensional, $N=1$ supersymmetric Yang-Mills theory, the super-ambitwistor correspondence, consists of an equivalence between the supersymmetric field equations and the vanishing of supercurvature along super null lines, which are of dimension $(1 | 16)$, where the $16$ Grassmannian dimensions correspond to a pure spinor. Dimensional reduction gives the corresponding results for $d=6$, $N=2$ and $d=4$, $N=3$ or $4$.

=== String theory and generalized Calabi-Yau manifolds ===
Pure spinors were introduced in string quantization by Nathan Berkovits. Nigel Hitchin introduced generalized Calabi–Yau manifolds, where the generalized complex structure is defined by a pure spinor. These spaces describe the geometry of flux compactifications in string theory.

=== Integrable systems ===
In the approach to integrable hierarchies developed by Mikio Sato, and his students, equations of the hierarchy are viewed as compatibility conditions for commuting flows on an infinite dimensional Grassmannian. Under the (infinite dimensional) Cartan map, projective pure spinors are equivalent to elements of the infinite dimensional Grassmannian consisting of maximal isotropic subspaces of a Hilbert space under a suitably defined complex scalar product. They therefore serve as moduli for solutions of the BKP integrable hierarchy, parametrizing the associated BKP $\tau$-functions, which are generating functions for the flows. Under the Cartan map correspondence, these may be expressed as infinite dimensional Fredholm Pfaffians.

== Bibliography ==
- Cartan, Élie (1981) [1966]. The Theory of Spinors. Dover Publications (reprint ed.). Paris, FR: Hermann (1966). ISBN 978-0-486-64070-9.
- Chevalley, Claude (1996) [1954]. The Algebraic Theory of Spinors and Clifford Algebras (reprint ed.). Columbia University Press (1954); Springer (1996). ISBN 978-3-540-57063-9.
- Charlton, Philip. The geometry of pure spinors, with applications, PhD thesis (1997).
