= Complex structure theory in English law =

Complex structure theory in English law refers to an attempt to circumvent the general rule that one cannot sue for solely pure economic loss in English tort law.

== Example ==
A faulty boiler is fitted into a house and causes structural damage to the property when it explodes. The owner of the property has no contractual relationship with the company which built the boiler. Proponents of complex structure theory argue that the end user should be able to recover the full cost of reinstating the item on the basis that the objective is to rectify damage to recover damage to the adjacent property, in this example, damage to the property.

== Status ==
Complex structure theory was mooted obiter in Murphy v Brentwood District Council.
