= Poisson manifold =

Mathematical structure in differential geometry

In differential geometry, a field in mathematics, a Poisson manifold is a smooth manifold endowed with a Poisson structure. The notion of Poisson manifold generalises that of symplectic manifold, which in turn generalises the phase space from Hamiltonian mechanics.

A Poisson structure (or Poisson bracket) on a smooth manifold $M$ is a function
$$\{ \cdot,\cdot \}: \mathcal{C}^{\infty}(M) \times \mathcal{C}^{\infty}(M) \to \mathcal{C}^{\infty}(M)$$
on the vector space $\mathcal{C}^{\infty}(M)$ of smooth functions on $M$, making it into a Lie algebra subject to a Leibniz rule (also known as a Poisson algebra).

Poisson structures on manifolds were introduced by André Lichnerowicz in 1977 and are named after the French mathematician Siméon Denis Poisson, due to their early appearance in his works on analytical mechanics.

Poisson geometry can be regarded as a combination of foliation theory, symplectic geometry, and Lie theory. A Poisson manifold foliates. Each leaf of the foliation has a symplectic structure. The leaves are connected transversely through Lie geometry.

== Introduction ==
=== From phase spaces of classical mechanics to symplectic and Poisson manifolds ===
In classical mechanics, the phase space of a physical system consists of all the possible values of the position and of the momentum variables allowed by the system. It is naturally endowed with a Poisson bracket/symplectic form (see below), which allows one to formulate the Hamilton equations and describe the dynamics of the system through the phase space in time.

For instance, a single particle freely moving in the $n$-dimensional Euclidean space (i.e. having $\mathbb{R}^n$ as configuration space) has phase space $\mathbb{R}^{2n}$. The coordinates $(q^1,...,q^n,p_1,...,p_n)$ describe respectively the positions and the generalised momenta. The space of observables, i.e. the smooth functions on $\mathbb{R}^{2n}$, is naturally endowed with a binary operation called Poisson bracket, defined as $\textstyle \{ f,g \} := \sum_{i=1}^n \left( \frac{\partial f}{\partial p_i} \frac{\partial g}{\partial q^i} - \frac{\partial f}{\partial q^i} \frac{\partial g}{\partial p_i} \right)$. Such bracket satisfies the standard properties of a Lie bracket, plus a further compatibility with the product of functions, namely the Leibniz identity $\{f,g \cdot h\} = g \cdot \{f,h\} + \{f,g\} \cdot h$. Equivalently, the Poisson bracket on $\mathbb{R}^{2n}$ can be reformulated using the symplectic form $\textstyle \omega := \sum_{i=1}^n dq^i \wedge dp_i$. Indeed, if one considers the Hamiltonian vector field $\textstyle X_f := \sum_{i=1}^n \left( \frac{\partial f}{\partial p_i} \partial_{q^i} - \frac{\partial f}{\partial q^i} \partial_{p_i} \right)$ associated to a function $f$, then the Poisson bracket can be rewritten as $\{f,g\} = \omega (X_g,X_f).$

In more abstract differential geometric terms, the configuration space is an $n$-dimensional smooth manifold $Q$, and the phase space is its cotangent bundle $T^*Q$ (a manifold of dimension $2n$). The latter is naturally equipped with a canonical symplectic form, which in canonical coordinates coincides with the one described above. In general, by Darboux theorem, any arbitrary symplectic manifold $(M,\omega)$ admits special coordinates where the form $\omega$ and the bracket $\{f,g\} = \omega (X_g,X_f)$ are equivalent with, respectively, the symplectic form and the Poisson bracket of $\mathbb{R}^{2n}$. Symplectic geometry is therefore the natural mathematical setting to describe classical Hamiltonian mechanics.

Poisson manifolds are further generalisations of symplectic manifolds, which arise by axiomatising the properties satisfied by the Poisson bracket on $\mathbb{R}^{2n}$. More precisely, a Poisson manifold consists of a smooth manifold $M$ (not necessarily of even dimension) together with an abstract bracket $\{\cdot,\cdot\}: \mathcal{C}^\infty(M) \times \mathcal{C}^\infty(M) \to \mathcal{C}^\infty(M)$, still called Poisson bracket, which does not necessarily arise from a symplectic form $\omega$, but satisfies the same algebraic properties.

Poisson geometry is closely related to symplectic geometry: for instance, every Poisson bracket determines a foliation whose leaves are naturally equipped with symplectic forms. However, the study of Poisson geometry requires techniques that are usually not employed in symplectic geometry, such as the theory of Lie groupoids and algebroids.

Moreover, there are natural examples of structures which should be "morally" symplectic, but fail to be so. For example, the smooth quotient of a symplectic manifold by a group acting by symplectomorphisms is a Poisson manifold, which in general is not symplectic. This situation models the case of a physical system which is invariant under symmetries: the "reduced" phase space, obtained by quotienting the original phase space by the symmetries, in general is no longer symplectic, but is Poisson.

=== History ===
Although the modern definition of Poisson manifold appeared only in the 1970s–1980s, its origin dates back to the nineteenth century. Alan Weinstein synthetised the early history of Poisson geometry as follows:

"Poisson invented his brackets as a tool for classical dynamics. Jacobi realized the importance of these brackets and elucidated their algebraic properties, and Lie began the study of their geometry."

Indeed, Siméon Denis Poisson introduced in 1809 what we now call Poisson bracket in order to obtain new integrals of motion, i.e. quantities which are preserved throughout the motion. More precisely, he proved that, if two functions $f$ and $g$ are integral of motions, then there is a third function, denoted by $\{ f,g \}$, which is an integral of motion as well. In the Hamiltonian formulation of mechanics, where the dynamics of a physical system is described by a given function $h$ (usually the energy of the system), an integral of motion is simply a function $f$ which Poisson-commutes with $h$, i.e. such that $\{f,h\} = 0$. What will become known as Poisson's theorem can then be formulated as
$$\{f,h\} = 0, \{g,h\} = 0 \Rightarrow \{\{f,g\},h\} = 0.$$
Poisson computations occupied many pages, and his results were rediscovered and simplified two decades later by Carl Gustav Jacob Jacobi. Jacobi was the first to identify the general properties of the Poisson bracket as a binary operation. Moreover, he established the relation between the (Poisson) bracket of two functions and the (Lie) bracket of their associated Hamiltonian vector fields, i.e.
$$X_{\{f,g\}} = [X_f,X_g],$$
in order to reformulate (and give a much shorter proof of) Poisson's theorem on integrals of motion. Jacobi's work on Poisson brackets influenced the pioneering studies of Sophus Lie on symmetries of differential equations, which led to the discovery of Lie groups and Lie algebras. For instance, what are now called linear Poisson structures (i.e. Poisson brackets on a vector space which send linear functions to linear functions) correspond precisely to Lie algebra structures. Moreover, the integrability of a linear Poisson structure (see below) is closely related to the integrability of its associated Lie algebra to a Lie group.

The twentieth century saw the development of modern differential geometry, but only in 1977 did André Lichnerowicz introduce Poisson structures as geometric objects on smooth manifolds. Poisson manifolds were further studied in the foundational 1983 paper of Alan Weinstein, where many basic structure theorems were first proved.

These works exerted a huge influence in the subsequent decades on the development of Poisson geometry, which today is a field of its own, and at the same time is deeply entangled with many others, including non-commutative geometry, integrable systems, topological field theories and representation theory.

== Formal definition ==
There are two main points of view to define Poisson structures: it is customary and convenient to switch between them.

=== As bracket ===
Let $M$ be a smooth manifold and let ${C^{\infty}}(M)$ denote the real algebra of smooth real-valued functions on $M$, where the multiplication is defined pointwise. A Poisson bracket (or Poisson structure) on $M$ is an $\mathbb{R}$-bilinear map

$$\{ \cdot,\cdot \}: {C^{\infty}}(M) \times {C^{\infty}}(M) \to {C^{\infty}}(M)$$

defining a structure of Poisson algebra on ${C^{\infty}}(M)$, i.e. satisfying the following three conditions:

- Skew symmetry: $\{ f,g \} = - \{ g,f \}$.
- Jacobi identity: $\{ f,\{ g,h \} \} + \{ g,\{ h,f \} \} + \{ h,\{ f,g \} \} = 0$.
- Leibniz's rule: $\{ f g,h \} = f \{ g,h \} + g \{ f,h \}$.

The first two conditions ensure that $\{ \cdot,\cdot \}$ defines a Lie-algebra structure on ${C^{\infty}}(M)$, while the third guarantees that, for each $f \in {C^{\infty}}(M)$, the linear map $X_f := \{ f,\cdot \}: {C^{\infty}}(M) \to {C^{\infty}}(M)$ is a derivation of the algebra ${C^{\infty}}(M)$, i.e., it defines a vector field $X_{f} \in \mathfrak{X}(M)$ called the Hamiltonian vector field associated to $f$.

Choosing local coordinates $(U, x^i)$, any Poisson bracket is given by
$$\{f, g\}_{\mid U} = \sum_{i,j} \pi^{ij} \frac{\partial f}{\partial x^i} \frac{\partial g}{\partial x^j},$$
for $\pi^{ij} = \{ x^i, x^j \}$ the Poisson bracket of the coordinate functions.

=== As bivector ===
A Poisson bivector on a smooth manifold $M$ is a Polyvector field $\textstyle \pi \in \mathfrak{X}^2(M) := \Gamma \left( \bigwedge^{2} T M \right)$ satisfying the non-linear partial differential equation $[\pi,\pi] = 0$, where

$$[\cdot,\cdot]: {\mathfrak{X}^{p}}(M) \times {\mathfrak{X}^{q}}(M) \to {\mathfrak{X}^{p + q - 1}}(M)$$

denotes the Schouten–Nijenhuis bracket on multivector fields. Choosing local coordinates $(U, x^i)$, any Poisson bivector is given by
$$\pi_{\mid U} = \sum_{i < j} \pi^{ij} \frac{\partial}{\partial x^i} \frac{\partial}{\partial x^j},$$
for skew-symmetric smooth functions $\pi^{ij}$ on $U$.

=== Equivalence of the definitions ===
Let $\{ \cdot,\cdot \}$ be a bilinear skew-symmetric bracket (called an "almost Lie bracket") satisfying Leibniz's rule; then the function $\{ f,g \}$ can be described as
$$\{ f,g \} = \pi(df \wedge dg),$$
for a unique smooth bivector field $\pi \in \mathfrak{X}^2(M)$. Conversely, given any smooth bivector field $\pi$ on $M$, the same formula $\{ f,g \} = \pi(df \wedge dg)$ defines an almost Lie bracket $\{ \cdot,\cdot \}$ that automatically obeys Leibniz's rule.

A bivector field, or the corresponding almost Lie bracket, is called an almost Poisson structure. An almost Poisson structure is Poisson if one of the following equivalent integrability conditions holds:

- $\{ \cdot,\cdot \}$ satisfies the Jacobi identity (hence it is a Poisson bracket);
- $\pi$ satisfies $[\pi,\pi] = 0$ (hence it a Poisson bivector);
- the map ${C^{\infty}}(M) \to \mathfrak{X}(M), f \mapsto X_f$ is a Lie algebra homomorphism, i.e. the Hamiltonian vector fields satisfy $[X_f, X_g] = X_{\{f,g\}}$;
- the graph ${\rm Graph}(\pi) := \{ \pi (\alpha, \cdot) +\alpha \} \subset TM \oplus T^*M$ defines a Dirac structure, i.e. a Lagrangian subbundle of $TM \oplus T^*M$ which is closed under the standard Courant bracket.

=== Holomorphic Poisson structures ===
The definition of Poisson structure for real smooth manifolds can be also adapted to the complex case.

A holomorphic Poisson manifold is a complex manifold $M$ whose sheaf of holomorphic functions $\mathcal{O}_M$ is a sheaf of Poisson algebras. Equivalently, recall that a holomorphic bivector field $\pi$ on a complex manifold $M$ is a section $\pi \in \Gamma (\wedge^2 T^{1,0}M)$ such that $\bar{\partial} \pi = 0$. Then a holomorphic Poisson structure on $M$ is a holomorphic bivector field satisfying the equation $[\pi,\pi]=0$. Holomorphic Poisson manifolds can be characterised also in terms of Poisson–Nijenhuis structures.

Many results for real Poisson structures, e.g. regarding their integrability, extend also to holomorphic ones.

Holomorphic Poisson structures appear naturally in the context of generalised complex structures: locally, any generalised complex manifold is the product of a symplectic manifold and a holomorphic Poisson manifold.

== Symplectic leaves ==
A Poisson manifold is naturally partitioned into regularly immersed symplectic manifolds of possibly different dimensions, called its symplectic leaves. These arise as the maximal integral submanifolds of the completely integrable singular distribution spanned by the Hamiltonian vector fields.

=== Rank of a Poisson structure ===
Recall that any bivector field can be regarded as a skew homomorphism $\pi^{\sharp}: T^{*} M \to T M, \alpha \mapsto \pi(\alpha,\cdot)$. The image ${\pi^{\sharp}}(T^{*} M) \subset TM$ consists therefore of the values ${X_{f}}(x)$ of all Hamiltonian vector fields evaluated at every $x \in M$.

The rank of $\pi$ at a point $x \in M$ is the rank of the induced linear mapping $\pi^{\sharp}_{x}$. A point $x \in M$ is called regular for a Poisson structure $\pi$ on $M$ if and only if the rank of $\pi$ is constant on an open neighborhood of $x \in M$; otherwise, it is called a singular point. Regular points form an open dense subset $M_{\mathrm{reg}} \subseteq M$; when the map $\pi^\sharp$ is of constant rank, the Poisson structure $\pi$ is called regular. Examples of regular Poisson structures include trivial and nondegenerate structures (see below).

=== The regular case ===
For a regular Poisson manifold, the image ${\pi^{\sharp}}(T^{*} M) \subset TM$ is a regular distribution; it is easy to check that it is involutive, therefore, by the Frobenius theorem, $M$ admits a partition into leaves. Moreover, the Poisson bivector restricts nicely to each leaf, which therefore become symplectic manifolds.

=== The non-regular case ===
For a non-regular Poisson manifold the situation is more complicated, since the distribution ${\pi^{\sharp}}(T^{*} M) \subset TM$ is singular, i.e. the vector subspaces ${\pi^{\sharp}}(T^{*}_x M) \subset T_xM$ have different dimensions.

An integral submanifold for ${\pi^{\sharp}}(T^{*} M)$ is a path-connected submanifold $S \subseteq M$ satisfying $T_{x} S = {\pi^{\sharp}}(T^{\ast}_{x} M)$ for all $x \in S$. Integral submanifolds of $\pi$ are automatically regularly immersed manifolds, and maximal integral submanifolds of $\pi$ are called the leaves of $\pi$.

Moreover, each leaf $S$ carries a natural symplectic form $\omega_{S} \in {\Omega^{2}}(S)$ determined by the condition $[{\omega_{S}}(X_{f},X_{g})](x) = - \{ f,g \}(x)$ for all $f,g \in {C^{\infty}}(M)$ and $x \in S$. Correspondingly, one speaks of the symplectic leaves of $\pi$. Moreover, both the space $M_{\mathrm{reg}}$ of regular points and its complement are saturated by symplectic leaves, so symplectic leaves may be either regular or singular.

=== Weinstein splitting theorem ===
To show the existence of symplectic leaves also in the non-regular case, one can use Weinstein splitting theorem (or Darboux-Weinstein theorem). It states that any Poisson manifold $(M^n, \pi)$ splits locally around a point $x_0 \in M$ as the product of a symplectic manifold $(S^{2k}, \omega)$ and a transverse Poisson submanifold $(T^{n-2k}, \pi_T)$ vanishing at $x_0$. More precisely, if $\mathrm{rank}(\pi_{x_0}) = 2k$, there are local coordinates $(U, p_1,\ldots,p_k,q^1,\ldots, q^k,x^1,\ldots,x^{n-2k})$ such that the Poisson bivector $\pi$ splits as the sum
$$\pi_{\mid U} = \sum_{i=1}^{k} \frac{\partial}{\partial q^i} \frac{\partial}{\partial p_i} + \frac{1}{2} \sum_{i,j=1}^{n-2k} \phi^{ij}(x) \frac{\partial}{\partial x^i} \frac{\partial}{\partial x^j},$$
where $\phi^{ij}(x_0) = 0$. Notice that, when the rank of $\pi$ is maximal (e.g. the Poisson structure is nondegenerate, so that $n = 2k$), one recovers the classical Darboux theorem for symplectic structures.

== Examples ==
=== Trivial Poisson structures ===
Every manifold $M$ carries the trivial Poisson structure
$$\{ f,g \} = 0 \quad \forall f,g \in \mathcal{C}^\infty (M),$$
equivalently described by the bivector $\pi=0$. Every point of $M$ is therefore a zero-dimensional symplectic leaf.

=== Nondegenerate Poisson structures ===
A bivector field $\pi$ is called nondegenerate if $\pi^{\sharp}: T^{*} M \to T M$ is a vector bundle isomorphism. Nondegenerate Poisson bivector fields are actually the same thing as symplectic manifolds $(M,\omega)$.

Indeed, there is a bijective correspondence between nondegenerate bivector fields $\pi$ and nondegenerate 2-forms $\omega$, given by
$$\pi^\sharp = (\omega^{\flat})^{-1},$$
where $\omega$ is encoded by the musical isomorphism $\omega^{\flat}: TM \to T^*M, v \mapsto \omega(v,\cdot)$. Furthermore, $\pi$ is Poisson precisely if and only if $\omega$ is closed; in such case, the bracket becomes the canonical Poisson bracket from Hamiltonian mechanics:
$$\{ f,g \} := \omega (X_g,X_f).$$
nondegenerate Poisson structures on connected manifolds have only one symplectic leaf, namely $M$ itself.

=== Log-symplectic Poisson structures ===
Consider the space $\mathbb{R}^{2n}$ with coordinates $(x,y,p_i,q^i)$. Then the bivector field
$$\pi := y \frac{\partial}{\partial x}  \frac{\partial}{\partial y} + \sum_{i=1}^{n-1} \frac{\partial}{\partial p_i} \frac{\partial}{\partial q^i}$$
is a Poisson structure on $\mathbb{R}^{2n}$ which is "almost everywhere nondegenerate". Indeed, the open submanifold $\{ y \neq 0 \} \subseteq M$ is a symplectic leaf of dimension $2n$, together with the symplectic form
$$\omega = \frac{1}{y} dx \wedge dy + \sum_{i=1}^{n-1} dq^i \wedge dp_i,$$
while the $(2n-1)$-dimensional submanifold $Z:= \{y = 0\} \subseteq M$ contains the other $(2n-2)$-dimensional leaves, which are the intersections of $Z$ with the level sets of $x$.

This is actually a particular case of a special class of Poisson manifolds $(M,\pi)$, called log-symplectic or b-symplectic, which have a "logarithmic singularity'' concentrated along a submanifold $Z \subseteq M$ of codimension 1 (also called the singular locus of $\pi$), but are nondegenerate outside of $Z$.

=== Linear Poisson structures ===
A Poisson structure $\{ \cdot, \cdot \}$ on a vector space $V$ is called linear when the bracket of two linear functions is still linear.

The class of vector spaces with linear Poisson structures coincides actually with that of (dual of) Lie algebras. Indeed, the dual $\mathfrak{g}^{*}$ of any finite-dimensional Lie algebra $(\mathfrak{g},[\cdot,\cdot])$ carries a linear Poisson bracket, known in the literature under the names of Lie-Poisson, Kirillov-Poisson or KKS (Kostant-Kirillov-Souriau) structure:
$$\{ f, g \} (\xi) := \xi ([d_\xi f,d_\xi g]_{\mathfrak{g}}),$$
where $f,g \in \mathcal{C}^{\infty}(\mathfrak{g}^*), \xi \in \mathfrak{g}^*$ and the derivatives $d_\xi f, d_\xi g: T_{\xi} \mathfrak{g}^* \to \mathbb{R}$ are interpreted as elements of the bidual $\mathfrak{g}^{**} \cong \mathfrak{g}$. Equivalently, the Poisson bivector can be locally expressed as
$$\pi = \sum_{i,j,k} c^{ij}_k x^k \frac{\partial}{\partial x^i} \frac{\partial}{\partial x^j},$$
where $x^i$ are coordinates on $\mathfrak{g}^{*}$ and $c_k^{ij}$ are the associated structure constants of $\mathfrak{g}$. Conversely, any linear Poisson structure $\{ \cdot, \cdot \}$ on $V$ must be of this form, i.e. there exists a natural Lie algebra structure induced on $\mathfrak{g}:=V^*$ whose Lie-Poisson bracket recovers $\{ \cdot, \cdot \}$.

The symplectic leaves of the Lie-Poisson structure on $\mathfrak{g}^*$ are the orbits of the coadjoint action of $G$ on $\mathfrak{g}^*$. For instance, for $\mathfrak{g} = \mathfrak{so}(3,\mathbb{R}) \cong \mathbb{R}^3$ with the standard basis, the Lie-Poisson structure on $\mathfrak{g}^*$ is identified with
$$\pi = x  \frac{\partial}{\partial y} \frac{\partial}{\partial z} + y \frac{\partial}{\partial z} \frac{\partial}{\partial x} + z \frac{\partial}{\partial x} \frac{\partial}{\partial y} \in \mathfrak{X}^2 (\mathbb{R}^3)$$
and its symplectic foliation is identified with the foliation by concentric spheres in $\mathbb{R}^3$ (the only singular leaf being the origin). On the other hand, for $\mathfrak{g} = \mathfrak{sl}(2,\mathbb{R}) \cong \mathbb{R}^3$ with the standard basis, the Lie-Poisson structure on $\mathfrak{g}^*$ is identified with
$$\pi = x \frac{\partial}{\partial y} \frac{\partial}{\partial z} - y \frac{\partial}{\partial z} \frac{\partial}{\partial x} + z \frac{\partial}{\partial x} \frac{\partial}{\partial y}  \in \mathfrak{X}^2 (\mathbb{R}^3)$$
and its symplectic foliation is identified with the foliation by concentric hyperboloids and conical surface in $\mathbb{R}^3$ (the only singular leaf being again the origin).

=== Fibrewise linear Poisson structures ===
The previous example can be generalised as follows. A Poisson structure on the total space of a vector bundle $E \to M$ is called fibrewise linear when the bracket of two smooth functions $E \to \mathbb{R}$, whose restrictions to the fibres are linear, is still linear when restricted to the fibres. Equivalently, the Poisson bivector field $\pi$ is asked to satisfy $(m_t)^*\pi = t \pi$ for any $t >0$, where $m_t: E \to E$ is the scalar multiplication $v \mapsto tv$.

The class of vector bundles with linear Poisson structures coincides actually with that of (dual of) Lie algebroids. Indeed, the dual $A^*$ of any Lie algebroid $(A, \rho,[\cdot, \cdot])$ carries a fibrewise linear Poisson bracket, uniquely defined by
$$\{ \mathrm{ev}_\alpha, \mathrm{ev}_\beta \}:= ev_{[\alpha,\beta]} \quad \quad \forall \alpha, \beta \in \Gamma(A),$$
where $\mathrm{ev}_\alpha: A^* \to \mathbb{R}, \phi \mapsto \phi(\alpha)$ is the evaluation by $\alpha$. Equivalently, the Poisson bivector can be locally expressed as
$$\pi = \sum_{i,a} B^i_a(x) \frac{\partial}{\partial y_a} \frac{\partial}{\partial x^i} + \sum_{a < b,c} C_{ab}^c(x) y_c \frac{\partial}{\partial y_a} \frac{\partial}{\partial y_b},$$
where $x^i$ are coordinates around a point $x \in M$, $y_a$ are fibre coordinates on $A^*$, dual to a local frame $e_a$ of $A$, and $B^i_a$ and $C^c_{ab}$ are the structure function of $A$, i.e. the unique smooth functions satisfying
$$\rho(e_a) = \sum_i B^i_a (x) \frac{\partial}{\partial x^i}, \quad \quad [e_a, e_b] = \sum_c C^c_{ab} (x) e_c.$$
Conversely, any fibrewise linear Poisson structure $\{ \cdot, \cdot \}$ on $E$ must be of this form, i.e. there exists a natural Lie algebroid structure induced on $A:=E^*$ whose Lie-Poisson bracket recovers $\{ \cdot, \cdot \}$.

If $A$ is integrable to a Lie groupoid $\mathcal{G} \rightrightarrows M$, the symplectic leaves of $A^*$ are the connected components of the orbits of the cotangent groupoid $T^* \mathcal{G} \rightrightarrows A^*$. In general, given any algebroid orbit $\mathcal{O} \subseteq M$, the image of its cotangent bundle via the dual $\rho^*: T^*M \to A^*$ of the anchor map is a symplectic leaf.

For $M = \{*\}$ one recovers linear Poisson structures, while for $A = TM$ the fibrewise linear Poisson structure is the nondegenerate one given by the canonical symplectic structure of the cotangent bundle $T^*M$. More generally, any fibrewise linear Poisson structure on $TM \to M$ that is nondegenerate is isomorphic to the canonical symplectic form on $T^*M$.

=== Other examples and constructions ===
- Any constant bivector field on a vector space is automatically a Poisson structure; indeed, all three terms in the Jacobiator are zero, being the bracket with a constant function.
- Any bivector field on a 2-dimensional manifold is automatically a Poisson structure; indeed, $[\pi,\pi]$ is a 3-vector field, which is always zero in dimension 2.
- Given any Poisson bivector field $\pi$ on a 3-dimensional manifold $M$, the bivector field $f \pi$, for any $f \in \mathcal{C}^\infty(M)$, is automatically Poisson.
- The Cartesian product $(M_{0} \times M_{1},\pi_{0} \times \pi_{1})$ of two Poisson manifolds $(M_{0},\pi_{0})$ and $(M_{1},\pi_{1})$ is again a Poisson manifold.
- Let $\mathcal{F}$ be a (regular) foliation of dimension $2k$ on $M$ and $\omega \in {\Omega^{2}}(\mathcal{F})$ a closed foliated two-form for which the power $\omega^{k}$ is nowhere-vanishing. This uniquely determines a regular Poisson structure on $M$ by requiring the symplectic leaves of $\pi$ to be the leaves $S$ of $\mathcal{F}$ equipped with the induced symplectic form $\omega|_S$.
- Let $G$ be a Lie group acting on a Poisson manifold $(M,\pi)$ and such that the Poisson bracket of $G$-invariant functions on $M$ is $G$-invariant. If the action is free and proper, the quotient manifold $M/G$ inherits a Poisson structure $\pi_{M/G}$ from $\pi$ (namely, it is the only one such that the submersion $(M,\pi) \to (M/G,\pi_{M/G})$ is a Poisson map).

== Poisson cohomology ==
The Poisson cohomology groups $H^k(M,\pi)$ of a Poisson manifold are the cohomology groups of the cochain complex
$$\ldots \xrightarrow{d_\pi} \mathfrak{X}^\bullet(M) \xrightarrow{d_\pi} \mathfrak{X}^{\bullet+1}(M) \xrightarrow{d_\pi} \ldots \color{white}{\sum^i}$$
where the operator $d_\pi = [\pi,-]$ is the Schouten-Nijenhuis bracket with $\pi$. Notice that such a sequence can be defined for every bivector $\pi$ on $M$; the condition $d_\pi \circ d_\pi = 0$ is equivalent to $[\pi,\pi]=0$, i.e. $(M,\pi)$ being Poisson.

Using the morphism $\pi^{\sharp}: T^{*} M \to T M$, one obtains a morphism from the de Rham complex $(\Omega^\bullet(M),d_{dR})$ to the Poisson complex $(\mathfrak{X}^\bullet(M), d_\pi)$, inducing a group homomorphism $H_{dR}^\bullet(M) \to H^\bullet(M,\pi)$. In the nondegenerate case, this becomes an isomorphism, so that the Poisson cohomology of a symplectic manifold fully recovers its de Rham cohomology.

Poisson cohomology is difficult to compute in general, but the low degree groups contain important geometric information on the Poisson structure:

- $H^0(M,\pi)$ is the space of the Casimir functions, i.e. smooth functions Poisson-commuting with all others (or, equivalently, smooth functions constant on the symplectic leaves);
- $H^1(M,\pi)$ is the space of Poisson vector fields modulo Hamiltonian vector fields;
- $H^2(M,\pi)$ is the space of the infinitesimal deformations of the Poisson structure modulo trivial deformations;
- $H^3(M,\pi)$ is the space of the obstructions to extend infinitesimal deformations to actual deformations.

=== Modular class ===
The modular class of a Poisson manifold is a class in the first Poisson cohomology group: for orientable manifolds, it is the obstruction to the existence of a volume form invariant under the Hamiltonian flows. It was introduced by Koszul and Weinstein.

Recall that the divergence of a vector field $X \in \mathfrak{X}(M)$ with respect to a given volume form $\lambda$ is the function ${\rm div}_\lambda (X) \in \mathcal{C}^\infty(M)$ defined by $\textstyle {\rm div}_\lambda (X) = \frac{\mathcal{L}_{X} \lambda}{\lambda}$. The modular vector field of an orientable Poisson manifold, with respect to a volume form $\lambda$, is the vector field $X_\lambda$ defined by the divergence of the Hamiltonian vector fields: $X_\lambda: f \mapsto {\rm div}_\lambda (X_f)$.

The modular vector field is a Poisson 1-cocycle, i.e. it satisfies $\mathcal{L}_{X_\lambda} \pi = 0$. Moreover, given two volume forms $\lambda_1$ and $\lambda_2$, the difference $X_{\lambda_1} - X_{\lambda_2}$ is a Hamiltonian vector field. Accordingly, the Poisson cohomology class $[X_\lambda]_\pi \in H^1 (M,\pi)$ does not depend on the original choice of the volume form $\lambda$, and it is called the modular class of the Poisson manifold.

An orientable Poisson manifold is called unimodular if its modular class vanishes. Notice that this happens if and only if there exists a volume form $\lambda$ such that the modular vector field $X_\lambda$ vanishes, i.e. ${\rm div}_\lambda (X_f) = 0$ for every $f$; in other words, $\lambda$ is invariant under the flow of any Hamiltonian vector field. For instance:

- Symplectic structures are always unimodular, since the Liouville form is invariant under all Hamiltonian vector fields.
- For linear Poisson structures the modular class is the infinitesimal modular character of $\mathfrak{g}$, since the modular vector field associated to the standard Lebesgue measure on $\mathfrak{g}^*$ is the constant vector field on $\mathfrak{g}^*$. Then $\mathfrak{g}^*$ is unimodular as Poisson manifold if and only if it is unimodular as Lie algebra.
- For regular Poisson structures the modular class is related to the Reeb class of the underlying symplectic foliation (an element of the first leafwise cohomology group, which obstructs the existence of a volume normal form invariant by vector fields tangent to the foliation).

The construction of the modular class can be easily extended to non-orientable manifolds by replacing volume forms with densities.

=== Poisson homology ===
Poisson cohomology was introduced in 1977 by Lichnerowicz himself; a decade later, Brylinski introduced a homology theory for Poisson manifolds, using the operator $\partial_\pi = [d, \iota_\pi]$.

Several results have been proved relating Poisson homology and cohomology. For instance, for orientable unimodular Poisson manifolds, Poisson homology turns out to be isomorphic to Poisson cohomology: this was proved independently by Xu and Evans-Lu-Weinstein.

== Poisson maps ==
A smooth map $\varphi: M \to N$ between Poisson manifolds is called a Poisson map if it respects the Poisson structures, i.e. one of the following equivalent conditions holds (compare with the equivalent definitions of Poisson structures above):

- the Poisson brackets $\{ \cdot,\cdot \}_{M}$ and $\{ \cdot,\cdot \}_{N}$ satisfy ${\{ f,g \}_{N}}(\varphi(x)) = {\{ f \circ \varphi,g \circ \varphi \}_{M}}(x)$ for every $x \in M$ and smooth functions $f,g \in {C^{\infty}}(N)$;
- the bivector fields $\pi_{M}$ and $\pi_{N}$ are $\varphi$-related, i.e. $\pi_N = \varphi_* \pi_M$;
- the Hamiltonian vector fields associated to every smooth function $H \in \mathcal{C}^\infty(N)$ are $\varphi$-related, i.e. $X_H = \varphi_* X_{H \circ \phi}$;
- the differential $d\varphi: (TM,{\rm Graph}(\pi_M)) \to (TN,{\rm Graph}(\pi_N))$ is a forward Dirac morphism.

An anti-Poisson map satisfies analogous conditions with a minus sign on one side.

Poisson manifolds are the objects of a category $\mathfrak{Poiss}$, with Poisson maps as morphisms. If a Poisson map $\varphi: M\to N$ is also a diffeomorphism, then we call $\varphi$ a Poisson-diffeomorphism.

=== Examples ===
- Given a product Poisson manifold $(M_{0} \times M_{1},\pi_{0} \times \pi_{1})$, the canonical projections $\mathrm{pr}_{i}: M_{0} \times M_{1} \to M_{i}$, for $i \in \{ 0,1 \}$, are Poisson maps.
- Given a Poisson manifold $(M,\pi)$, the inclusion into $M$ of a symplectic leaf, or of an open subset, is a Poisson map.
- Given two Lie algebras $\mathfrak{g}$ and $\mathfrak{h}$, the dual of any Lie algebra homomorphism $\mathfrak{g} \to \mathfrak{h}$ induces a Poisson map $\mathfrak{h}^* \to \mathfrak{g}^*$ between their linear Poisson structures.
- Given two Lie algebroids $A \to M$ and $B \to M$, the dual of any Lie algebroid morphism $A \to B$ over the identity induces a Poisson map $B^* \to A^*$ between their fibrewise linear Poisson structures.

One should notice that the notion of a Poisson map is fundamentally different from that of a symplectic map. For instance, with their standard symplectic structures, there exist no Poisson maps $\mathbb{R}^{2} \to \mathbb{R}^{4}$, whereas symplectic maps abound. More generally, given two symplectic manifolds $(M_1,\omega_1)$ and $(M_2,\omega_2)$ and a smooth map $f: M_1 \to M_2$, if $f$ is a Poisson map, it must be a submersion, while if $f$ is a symplectic map, it must be an immersion.

== Integration of Poisson manifolds ==
Any Poisson manifold $(M,\pi)$ induces a structure of Lie algebroid on its cotangent bundle $T^*M \to M$, also called the cotangent algebroid. The anchor map is given by $\pi^{\sharp}: T^{*} M \to T M$ while the Lie bracket on $\Gamma(T^*M) = \Omega^1(M)$ is defined as
$$[\alpha, \beta] := \mathcal{L}_{\pi^\sharp(\alpha)} (\beta) - \iota_{\pi^\sharp(\beta)} d\alpha = \mathcal{L}_{\pi^\sharp(\alpha)} (\beta) - \mathcal{L}_{\pi^\sharp(\beta)} (\alpha) - d\pi (\alpha, \beta).$$
Several notions defined for Poisson manifolds can be interpreted via its Lie algebroid $T^*M$:

- the symplectic foliation is the usual (singular) foliation induced by the anchor of the Lie algebroid;
- the symplectic leaves are the orbits of the Lie algebroid;
- a Poisson structure on $M$ is regular precisely when the associated Lie algebroid $T^*M$ is;
- the Poisson cohomology groups coincide with the Lie algebroid cohomology groups of $T^*M$ with coefficients in the trivial representation;
- the modular class of a Poisson manifold coincides with the modular class of the associated Lie algebroid $T^*M$.

It is of crucial importance to notice that the Lie algebroid $T^*M$ is not always integrable to a Lie groupoid.

=== Symplectic groupoids ===
A symplectic groupoid is a Lie groupoid $\mathcal{G} \rightrightarrows M$ together with a symplectic form $\omega \in \Omega^2(\mathcal{G})$ which is also multiplicative, i.e. it satisfies the following algebraic compatibility with the groupoid multiplication: $m^*\omega = {\rm pr}_1^* \omega + {\rm pr}_2^* \omega$. Equivalently, the graph of $m$ is asked to be a Lagrangian submanifold of $(\mathcal{G} \times \mathcal{G} \times \mathcal{G}, \omega \oplus \omega \oplus - \omega)$. Among the several consequences, the dimension of $\mathcal{G}$ is automatically twice the dimension of $M$. The notion of symplectic groupoid was introduced at the end of the 1980s independently by several authors.

A fundamental theorem states that the base space of any symplectic groupoid admits a unique Poisson structure $\pi$ such that the source map $s: (\mathcal{G}, \omega) \to (M,\pi)$ and the target map $t: (\mathcal{G}, \omega) \to (M,\pi)$ are, respectively, a Poisson map and an anti-Poisson map. Moreover, the Lie algebroid ${\rm Lie}(\mathcal{G})$ is isomorphic to the cotangent algebroid $T^*M$ associated to the Poisson manifold $(M,\pi)$. Conversely, if the cotangent bundle $T^*M$ of a Poisson manifold is integrable (as a Lie algebroid), then its $s$-simply connected integration $\mathcal{G} \rightrightarrows M$ is automatically a symplectic groupoid.

Accordingly, the integrability problem for a Poisson manifold consists in finding a (symplectic) Lie groupoid which integrates its cotangent algebroid; when this happens, the Poisson structure is called integrable.

While any Poisson manifold admits a local integration (i.e. a symplectic groupoid where the multiplication is defined only locally), there are general topological obstructions to its integrability, coming from the integrability theory for Lie algebroids. The candidate $\Pi(M,\pi)$ for the symplectic groupoid integrating any given Poisson manifold $(M,\pi)$ is called Poisson homotopy groupoid and is simply the Ševera-Weinstein groupoid of the cotangent algebroid $T^*M \to M$, consisting of the quotient of the Banach space of a special class of paths in $T^*M$ by a suitable equivalent relation. Equivalently, $\Pi(M,\pi)$ can be described as an infinite-dimensional symplectic quotient.

=== Examples of integrations ===
- The trivial Poisson structure $(M,0)$ is always integrable, a symplectic groupoid being the bundle of abelian (additive) groups $T^*M \rightrightarrows M$ with the canonical symplectic structure.
- A nondegenerate Poisson structure on $M$ is always integrable, a symplectic groupoid being the pair groupoid $M \times M \rightrightarrows M$ together with the symplectic form $s^* \omega - t^* \omega$ (for $\pi^\sharp = (\omega^{\flat})^{-1}$).
- A Lie-Poisson structure on $\mathfrak{g}^*$ is always integrable, a symplectic groupoid being the (coadjoint) action groupoid $G \times \mathfrak{g}^* \rightrightarrows \mathfrak{g}^*$, for $G$ a Lie group integrating $\mathfrak{g}$, together with the canonical symplectic form of $T^*G \cong G \times \mathfrak{g}^*$.
- A Lie-Poisson structure on $A^*$ is integrable if and only if the Lie algebroid $A \to M$ is integrable to a Lie groupoid $\mathcal{G} \rightrightarrows M$, a symplectic groupoid being the cotangent groupoid $T^*\mathcal{G} \rightrightarrows A^*$ with the canonical symplectic form.

=== Symplectic realisations ===
A (full) symplectic realisation on a Poisson manifold M consists of a symplectic manifold $(P,\omega)$ together with a Poisson map $\phi: (P,\omega) \to (M,\pi)$ which is a surjective submersion. Roughly speaking, the role of a symplectic realisation is to "desingularise" a complicated (degenerate) Poisson manifold by passing to a bigger, but easier (nondegenerate), one.

A symplectic realisation $\phi$ is called complete if, for any complete Hamiltonian vector field $X_H$, the vector field $X_{H \circ \phi}$ is complete as well. While symplectic realisations always exist for every Poisson manifold (and several different proofs are available), complete ones do not, and their existence plays a fundamental role in the integrability problem for Poisson manifolds. Indeed, using the topological obstructions to the integrability of Lie algebroids, one can show that a Poisson manifold is integrable if and only if it admits a complete symplectic realisation. This fact can also be proved more directly, without using Crainic-Fernandes obstructions.

== Poisson submanifolds ==
A Poisson submanifold of $(M, \pi)$ is an immersed submanifold $N \subseteq M$ together with a Poisson structure $\pi_N$ such that the immersion map $(N,\pi_N) \hookrightarrow (M,\pi)$ is a Poisson map. Alternatively, one can require one of the following equivalent conditions:

- the image of $\pi_x^{\sharp}: T^{*}_x M \to T_x M, \alpha \mapsto \pi_x(\alpha,\cdot)$ is inside $T_xN$ for every $x \in N$;
- the $\pi$-orthogonal $(TN)^{\perp_{\pi}} := \pi^\# (TN^\circ)$ vanishes, where $TN^\circ \subseteq T^*N$ denotes the annihilator of $TN$;
- every Hamiltonian vector field $X_f$, for $f \in \mathcal{C}^\infty(M)$, is tangent to $N$.

=== Examples ===
- Given any Poisson manifold $(M,\pi)$, its symplectic leaves $S \subseteq M$ are Poisson submanifolds.
- Given any Poisson manifold $(M,\pi)$ and a Casimir function $f: M \to \mathbb{R}$, its level sets $f^{-1}(\lambda)$, with $\lambda$ any regular value of $f$, are Poisson submanifolds (actually they are unions of symplectic leaves).
- Consider a Lie algebra $\mathfrak{g}$ and the Lie-Poisson structure on $\mathfrak{g}^*$. If $\mathfrak{g}$ is compact, its Killing form defines an $\mathrm{ad}$-invariant inner product on $\mathfrak{g}$, hence an $\mathrm{ad}^*$-invariant inner product $\langle \cdot,\cdot \rangle_{\mathfrak{g}^*}$ on $\mathfrak{g}^*$. Then the sphere $\mathbb{S}_\lambda = \{ \xi \in \mathfrak{g}^* | \langle \xi, \xi \rangle_{\mathfrak{g}^*} = \lambda^2 \} \subseteq \mathfrak{g}^*$ is a Poisson submanifold for every $\lambda > 0$, being a union of coadjoint orbits (which are the symplectic leaves of the Lie-Poisson structure). This can be checked equivalently after noticing that $\mathbb{S}_\lambda = f^{-1} (\lambda^2)$ for the Casimir function $f(\xi)= \langle \xi, \xi \rangle_{\mathfrak{g}^*}$.

=== Other types of submanifolds in Poisson geometry ===
The definition of Poisson submanifold is very natural and satisfies several good properties, e.g. the transverse intersection of two Poisson submanifolds is again a Poisson submanifold. However, it does not behave well functorially: if $\Phi: (M,\pi_M) \to (N,\pi_N)$ is a Poisson map transverse to a Poisson submanifold $Q \subseteq N$, the submanifold $\Phi^{-1} (Q) \subseteq M$ is not necessarily Poisson. In order to overcome this problem, one can use the notion of Poisson transversals (originally called cosymplectic submanifolds). A Poisson transversal is a submanifold $X \subseteq (M,\pi)$ which is transverse to every symplectic leaf $S \subseteq M$ and such that the intersection $X \cap S$ is a symplectic submanifold of $(S,\omega_S)$. It follows that any Poisson transversal $X \subseteq (M,\pi)$ inherits a canonical Poisson structure $\pi_X$ from $\pi$. In the case of a nondegenerate Poisson manifold $(M, \pi)$ (whose only symplectic leaf is $M$ itself), Poisson transversals are the same thing as symplectic submanifolds.

Another important generalisation of Poisson submanifolds is given by coisotropic submanifolds, introduced by Weinstein in order to "extend the lagrangian calculus from symplectic to Poisson manifolds". A coisotropic submanifold is a submanifold $C \subseteq (M,\pi)$ such that the $\pi$-orthogonal $(TC)^{\perp_{\pi}} := \pi^\# (TC^\circ)$ is a subspace of $TC$. For instance, given a smooth map $\Phi: (M,\pi_M) \to (N,\pi_N)$, its graph is a coisotropic submanifold of $(M \times N, \pi_M \times - (\pi_N) )$ if and only if $\Phi$ is a Poisson map. Similarly, given a Lie algebra $\mathfrak{g}$ and a vector subspace $\mathfrak{h} \subseteq \mathfrak{g}$, its annihilator $\mathfrak{h}^\circ$ is a coisotropic submanifold of the Lie-Poisson structure on $\mathfrak{g}^*$ if and only if $\mathfrak{h}$ is a Lie subalgebra. In general, coisotropic submanifolds such that $(TC)^{\perp_{\pi}} = 0$ recover Poisson submanifolds, while for nondegenerate Poisson structures, coisotropic submanifolds boil down to the classical notion of coisotropic submanifold in symplectic geometry.

Other classes of submanifolds which play an important role in Poisson geometry include Lie–Dirac submanifolds, Poisson–Dirac submanifolds and pre-Poisson submanifolds.

== Further topics ==
=== Deformation quantisation ===
The main idea of deformation quantisation is to deform the (commutative) algebra of functions on a Poisson manifold into a non-commutative one, in order to investigate the passage from classical mechanics to quantum mechanics. This topic was one of the driving forces for the development of Poisson geometry, and the precise notion of formal deformation quantisation was developed already in 1978.

A (differential) star product on a manifold $M$ is an associative, unital and $\mathbb{R}[[\hbar]]$-bilinear product
$$*_{\hbar}: \mathcal{C}^\infty(M)[[\hbar]] \times \mathcal{C}^\infty(M)[[\hbar]] \to \mathcal{C}^\infty(M)[[\hbar]]$$
on the ring $\mathcal{C}^\infty(M)[[\hbar]]$ of formal power series, of the form
$$f *_{\hbar} g = \sum_{k=0}^\infty \hbar^k C_k (f,g), \quad \quad f,g \in \mathcal{C}^\infty(M),$$
where $\{ C_k: \mathcal{C}^\infty(M) \times \mathcal{C}^\infty(M) \to \mathcal{C}^\infty(M) \}_{k=1}^\infty$ is a family of bidifferential operators on $M$ such that $C_0 (f,g)$ is the pointwise multiplication $fg$.

The expression $\{f,g\}_{*_\hbar} := C_1 (f,g) - C_1 (g,f)$ defines a Poisson bracket on $M$, which can be interpreted as the "classical limit" of the star product $*_{\hbar }$ when the formal parameter $\hbar$ (denoted with same symbol as the reduced Planck constant) goes to zero, i.e.
$$\{f,g\}_{*_\hbar} = \lim_{\hbar \to 0} \frac{f*g - g*f}{\hbar} = C_1 (f,g) - C_1 (g,f).$$

A (formal) deformation quantisation of a Poisson manifold $(M,\pi)$ is a star product $*_{\hbar }$ such that the Poisson bracket $\{\cdot,\cdot\}_\pi$ coincide with $\{\cdot,\cdot\}_{*_\hbar}$. Several classes of Poisson manifolds have been shown to admit a canonical deformation quantisations:

- $\mathbb{R}^{2n}$ with the canonical Poisson bracket (or, more generally, any finite-dimensional vector space with a constant Poisson bracket) admits the Moyal-Weyl product;
- the dual $\mathfrak{g}^*$ of any Lie algebra $\mathfrak{g}$, with the Lie-Poisson structure, admits the Gutt star product;
- any nondegenerate Poisson manifold admits a deformation quantisation. This was shown first for symplectic manifolds with a flat symplectic connection, and then in general by de Wilde and Lecompte, while a more explicit approach was provided later by Fedosov and several other authors.

In general, building a deformation quantisation for any given Poisson manifold is a highly non trivial problem, and for several years it was not clear if it would be even possible. In 1997 Kontsevich provided a quantisation formula, which shows that every Poisson manifold$(M,\pi)$ admits a canonical deformation quantisation; this contributed to getting him the Fields Medal in 1998.

Kontsevich's proof relies on an algebraic result, known as the formality conjecture, which involves a quasi-isomorphism of differential graded Lie algebras between the multivector fields $\mathfrak{X}^\bullet(M) = T_{\rm poly}^\bullet (M)$ (with Schouten bracket and zero differential) and the multidifferential operators $D^\bullet_{\rm poly} (M)$ (with Gerstenhaber bracket and Hochschild differential). Alternative approaches and more direct constructions of Kontsevich's deformation quantisation were later provided by other authors.

=== Linearisation problem ===
The isotropy Lie algebra of a Poisson manifold $(M, \pi)$ at a point $x \in M$ is the isotropy Lie algebra $\mathfrak{g}_x := \ker (\pi_x^\#) \subseteq T_x^*M$ of its cotangent Lie algebroid $T^*M$; explicitly, its Lie bracket is given by $[d_xf, d_xg] = d_x (\{f,g\})$. If, furthermore, $x$ is a zero of $\pi$, i.e. $\pi_x = 0$, then $\mathfrak{g}_x=T_x^*M$ is the entire cotangent space. Due to the correspondence between Lie algebra structures on $V$ and linear Poisson structures, there is an induced linear Poisson structure on $(T_x^* M)^* \cong T_x M$, denoted by $\pi_x^{\rm lin}$. A Poisson manifold $(M, \pi)$ is called (smoothly) linearisable at a zero $x \in M$ if there exists a Poisson diffeomorphism between $(M, \pi)$ and $(T_x M, \pi_x^{\rm lin})$ which sends $x$ to $0_x$.

It is in general a difficult problem to determine if a given Poisson manifold is linearisable, and in many instances the answer is negative. For instance, if the isotropy Lie algebra of $(M, \pi)$ at a zero $x \in M$ is isomorphic to the special linear Lie algebra $\mathfrak{sl} (2,\mathbb{R})$, then $(M, \pi)$ is not linearisable at $x$. Other counterexamples arise when the isotropy Lie algebra is a semisimple Lie algebra of real rank at least 2, or when it is a semisimple Lie algebra of rank 1 whose compact part (in the Cartan decomposition) is not semisimple.

A notable sufficient condition for linearisability is provided by Conn's linearisation theorem:

Let $(M, \pi)$ be a Poisson manifold and $x \in M$ a zero of $\pi$. If the isotropy Lie algebra $\mathfrak{g}_x$ is semisimple and compact, then $(M, \pi)$ is linearisable around $x$.

In the previous counterexample, indeed, $\mathfrak{sl} (2,\mathbb{R})$ is semisimple but not compact. The original proof of Conn involves several estimates from analysis in order to apply the Nash-Moser theorem; a different proof, employing geometric methods which were not available at Conn's time, was provided by Crainic and Fernandes.

If one restricts to analytic Poisson manifolds, a similar linearisation theorem holds, only requiring the isotropy Lie algebra $\mathfrak{g}_x$ to be semisimple. This was conjectured by Weinstein and proved by Conn before his result in the smooth category; a more geometric proof was given by Zung. Several other particular cases when the linearisation problem has a positive answer have been proved in the formal, smooth or analytic category.

=== Poisson-Lie groups ===
A Poisson-Lie group is a Lie group $G$ together with a Poisson structure compatible with the multiplication map. This condition can be formulated in a number of equivalent ways:

- the multiplication $m: G \times G \to G$ is a Poisson map, with respect to the product Poisson structure on $G \times G$;
- the Poisson bracket satisfies $\{f_1,f_2\} (gh) = \{f_1 \circ L_g, f_2 \circ L_g\} (h) + \{f_1 \circ R_{h}, f_2 \circ R_{h}\} (g)$ for every $g,h \in G$ and $f_1,f_2 \in \mathcal{C}^\infty(G)$, where $L_g$ and $R_h$ are the right- and left-translations of $G$;
- the Poisson bivector field $\pi$ is a multiplicative tensor, i.e. it satisfies $\pi (gh) = (L_g)_* (\pi (h)) + (R_h)_* (\pi (g))$ for every $g,h \in G$.

It follows from the last characterisation that the Poisson bivector field $\pi$ of a Poisson-Lie group always vanishes at the unit $e \in G$. Accordingly, a non-trivial Poisson-Lie group cannot arise from a symplectic structure, otherwise it would contradict Weinstein splitting theorem applied to $e$; for the same reason, $\pi$ cannot even be of constant rank.

Infinitesimally, a Poisson-Lie group $G$ induces a comultiplication $\textstyle \mu: \mathfrak{g} \to \bigwedge^2 \mathfrak{g}$ on its Lie algebra $\mathfrak{g} = \mathrm{Lie}(G)$, obtained by linearising the Poisson bivector field $\textstyle \pi: G \to \bigwedge^2 TG$ at the unit $e \in G$, i.e. $\mu : = d_e \pi$. The comultiplication $\mu$ endows $\mathfrak{g}$ with a structure of Lie coalgebra, which is moreover compatible with the original Lie algebra structure, making $\mathfrak{g}$ into a Lie bialgebra. Moreover, Drinfeld proved that there is an equivalence of categories between simply connected Poisson-Lie groups and finite-dimensional Lie bialgebras, extending the classical equivalence between simply connected Lie groups and finite-dimensional Lie algebras.

Weinstein generalised Poisson-Lie groups to Poisson(-Lie) groupoids, which are Lie groupoids $\mathcal{G} \rightrightarrows M$ with a compatible Poisson structure on the space of arrows $G$. This can be formalised by saying that the graph of the multiplication defines a coisotropic submanifold of $(\mathcal{G} \times \mathcal{G} \times \mathcal{G}, \pi \times \pi \times (-\pi))$, or in other equivalent ways. Moreover, Mackenzie and Xu extended Drinfeld's correspondence to a correspondence between Poisson groupoids and Lie bialgebroids.
