= Complex manifold =

Manifold

Holomorphic maps

In differential geometry and complex geometry, a complex manifold or a complex analytic manifold is a manifold with a complex structure, that is an atlas of charts to the open unit ball in the complex coordinate space $\mathbb{C}^n$, such that the transition maps are holomorphic.

The term "complex manifold" is variously used to mean a complex manifold in the sense above (which can be specified as an integrable complex manifold) or an almost complex manifold.

== Implications of complex structure ==
Since holomorphic functions are much more rigid than smooth functions, the theories of smooth and complex manifolds have very different flavors: compact complex manifolds are much closer to algebraic varieties than to differentiable manifolds. In particular, while complex manifolds and complex-analytic manifolds are the same, smooth manifolds and real-analytic manifolds are not the same.

For example, the Whitney embedding theorem tells us that every smooth n-dimensional manifold can be embedded as a smooth submanifold of R^{2n}, whereas it is "rare" for a complex manifold to have a holomorphic embedding into C^{n}. Consider for example any compact connected complex manifold M: any holomorphic function on it is constant by the maximum modulus principle. Now if we had a holomorphic embedding of M into C^{n}, then the coordinate functions of C^{n} would restrict to nonconstant holomorphic functions on M, contradicting compactness, except in the case that M is just a point. Complex manifolds that can be embedded in C^{n} are called Stein manifolds and form a very special class of manifolds including, for example, smooth complex affine algebraic varieties.

The classification of complex manifolds is much more subtle than that of differentiable manifolds. For example, while in dimensions other than four, a given topological manifold has at most finitely many smooth structures, a topological manifold supporting a complex structure can and often does support uncountably many complex structures. Riemann surfaces, two dimensional manifolds equipped with a complex structure, which are topologically classified by the genus, are an important example of this phenomenon. The set of complex structures on a given orientable surface, modulo biholomorphic equivalence, itself forms a complex algebraic variety called a moduli space, the structure of which remains an area of active research.

Since the transition maps between charts are biholomorphic, complex manifolds are, in particular, smooth and canonically oriented (not just orientable: a biholomorphic map to (a subset of) C^{n} gives an orientation, as biholomorphic maps are orientation-preserving).

== Examples of complex manifolds ==
- Riemann surfaces.
- Calabi–Yau manifolds.
- The Cartesian product of two complex manifolds.
- The inverse image of any noncritical value of a holomorphic map.

=== Smooth complex algebraic varieties ===
Smooth complex algebraic varieties are complex manifolds, including:

- Complex vector spaces.
- Complex projective spaces, P^{n}(C).
- Complex Grassmannians.
- Complex Lie groups such as GL(n, C) or Sp(n, C).

=== Simply connected ===
The simply connected 1-dimensional complex manifolds are isomorphic to either:

- Δ, the unit disk in C
- C, the complex plane
- Ĉ, the Riemann sphere

Note that there are inclusions between these as Δ ⊆ C ⊆ Ĉ, but that there are no non-constant holomorphic maps in the other direction, by Liouville's theorem.

== Disc vs. space vs. polydisc ==
The following spaces are different as complex manifolds, demonstrating the more rigid geometric character of complex manifolds (compared to smooth manifolds):

- complex space $\mathbb{C}^n$.
- the unit disc or open ball

$$\left \{ z \in \mathbb{C}^n : \|z\| < 1 \right \}.$$

- the polydisc

$$\left \{z = (z_1, \dots, z_n) \in \mathbb{C}^n : \vert z_j \vert < 1\ \forall j = 1,\dots,n \right \}.$$

== Almost complex structures ==
An almost complex structure on a real 2n-manifold is a GL(n, C)-structure (in the sense of G-structures) – that is, the tangent bundle is equipped with a linear complex structure.

Concretely, this is an endomorphism of the tangent bundle whose square is −I; this endomorphism is analogous to multiplication by the imaginary number i, and is denoted J (to avoid confusion with the identity matrix I). An almost complex manifold is necessarily even-dimensional.

An almost complex structure is weaker than a complex structure: any complex manifold has an almost complex structure, but not every almost complex structure comes from a complex structure. Note that every even-dimensional real manifold has an almost complex structure defined locally from the local coordinate chart. The question is whether this almost complex structure can be defined globally. An almost complex structure that comes from a complex structure is called integrable, and when one wishes to specify a complex structure as opposed to an almost complex structure, one says an integrable complex structure. For integrable complex structures the so-called Nijenhuis tensor vanishes. This tensor is defined on pairs of vector fields, X, Y by

$$N_J(X,Y) = [X,Y] + J[JX,Y] + J[X,JY]-[JX,JY]\ .$$

For example, the 6-dimensional sphere S^{6} has a natural almost complex structure arising from the fact that it is the orthogonal complement of i in the unit sphere of the octonions, but this is not a complex structure. (The question of whether it has a complex structure is known as the Hopf problem, after Heinz Hopf.) Using an almost complex structure we can make sense of holomorphic maps and ask about the existence of holomorphic coordinates on the manifold. The existence of holomorphic coordinates is equivalent to saying the manifold is complex (which is what the chart definition says).

Tensoring the tangent bundle with the complex numbers we get the complexified tangent bundle, on which multiplication by complex numbers makes sense (even if we started with a real manifold). The eigenvalues of an almost complex structure are ±i and the eigenspaces form sub-bundles denoted by T^{0,1}M and T^{1,0}M. The Newlander–Nirenberg theorem shows that an almost complex structure is actually a complex structure precisely when these subbundles are involutive, i.e., closed under the Lie bracket of vector fields, and such an almost complex structure is called integrable.

== Kähler and Calabi–Yau manifolds ==
One can define an analogue of a Riemannian metric for complex manifolds, called a Hermitian metric. Like a Riemannian metric, a Hermitian metric consists of a smoothly varying, positive definite inner product on the tangent bundle, which is Hermitian with respect to the complex structure on the tangent space at each point. As in the Riemannian case, such metrics always exist in abundance on any complex manifold, i.e. a Hermitian structure is not rigid.

A Hermitian form can be decomposed into a real part and a complex part as $h(X, Y) = g(X, Y) + i\omega(X, Y)$. The real part is a Riemannian metric, and the complex part is skew-symmetric. If the skew-symmetric part is symplectic, i.e. closed and nondegenerate, then the metric is called Kähler. Kähler structures are rare and are much more rigid.

Examples of Kähler manifolds include smooth projective varieties and more generally any complex submanifold of a Kähler manifold. The Hopf manifolds are examples of complex manifolds that are not Kähler. To construct one, take a complex vector space minus the origin and consider the action of the group of integers on this space by multiplication by exp(n). The quotient is a complex manifold whose first Betti number is one, so by the Hodge theory, it cannot be Kähler.

A Calabi–Yau manifold can be defined as a compact Ricci-flat Kähler manifold or equivalently one whose first Chern class vanishes.

== See also ==
- Complex dimension
- Complex analytic variety
- Quaternionic manifold
- Real-complex manifold
