= Symplectic geometry =

Branch of differential geometry and differential topology

Phase portrait of the Van der Pol oscillator, a one-dimensional system. Phase space was the original object of study in symplectic geometry.

Symplectic geometry is a branch of differential geometry and differential topology that studies symplectic manifolds; that is, differentiable manifolds equipped with a closed, nondegenerate 2-form. Symplectic geometry has its origins in the Hamiltonian formulation of classical mechanics where the phase space of certain classical systems takes on the structure of a symplectic manifold.

== Etymology ==
The term "symplectic", as adopted into mathematics by Hermann Weyl, is a neo-Greek calque of "complex". Previously, the "symplectic group" had been called the "line complex group". "Complex" comes from the Latin com-plexus, meaning "braided together" (co- + plexus), while "symplectic" represents the corresponding Greek sym-plektikos (συμπλεκτικός "twining or plaiting together, copulative"). In both cases, the stems come from the Indo-European root *pleḱ-, expressing the concept of folding or weaving, and the prefixes suggest "togetherness". The name reflects the deep connections between complex and symplectic structures.

By Darboux's theorem, symplectic manifolds are locally isomorphic to the standard symplectic vector space. Hence they have only global (topological) invariants. The term "symplectic topology" is often used interchangeably with "symplectic geometry".

== Overview ==
The name "complex group" formerly advocated by me in allusion to line complexes, as these are defined by the vanishing of antisymmetric bilinear forms, has become more and more embarrassing through collision with the word "complex" in the connotation of complex number. I therefore propose to replace it by the corresponding Greek adjective "symplectic". Dickson called the group the "Abelian linear group" in homage to Abel who first studied it.

— Weyl (1939, p. 165)

A symplectic geometry is defined on a smooth even-dimensional space that is a differentiable manifold. On this space a geometric object is defined, the symplectic 2-form, that allows for the measurement of sizes of two-dimensional objects in the space. The symplectic form in symplectic geometry plays a role analogous to that of the metric tensor in Riemannian geometry. Where the metric tensor measures lengths and angles, the symplectic form measures oriented areas.

Symplectic geometry arose from the study of classical mechanics and an example of a symplectic structure is the motion of an object in one dimension. To specify the trajectory of the object, one requires both the position q and the momentum p, which form a point (p,q) in the Euclidean plane $\mathbb{R}^{2}$. In this case, the symplectic form is

$$\omega = dp \wedge dq$$

and is an area form that measures the area A of a region S in the plane through integration:

$$A = \int_S \omega.$$

The area is important because as conservative dynamical systems evolve in time, this area is invariant.

Higher dimensional symplectic geometries are defined analogously. A 2n-dimensional symplectic geometry is formed of pairs of directions

$$((x_1,x_2), (x_3,x_4),\ldots(x_{2n-1},x_{2n}))$$

in a 2n-dimensional manifold along with a symplectic form

$$\omega = dx_1 \wedge dx_2 + dx_3 \wedge dx_4 + \cdots + dx_{2n-1} \wedge dx_{2n}.$$

This symplectic form yields the size of a 2n-dimensional region V in the space as the sum of the areas of the projections of V onto each of the planes formed by the pairs of directions

$$A = \int_V \omega = \int_V dx_1 \wedge dx_2 + \int_V dx_3 \wedge dx_4 + \cdots + \int_V dx_{2n-1} \wedge dx_{2n}.$$

== Comparison with Riemannian geometry ==
Riemannian geometry is the study of differentiable manifolds equipped with nondegenerate, symmetric 2-tensors (called metric tensors). Symplectic geometry has a number of similarities with and differences from Riemannian geometry.

Unlike in the Riemannian case, symplectic manifolds have no local invariants such as curvature. This is a consequence of Darboux's theorem which states that a neighborhood of any point of a 2n-dimensional symplectic manifold is isomorphic to the standard symplectic structure on an open set of $\mathbb{R}^{2n}$.

Another difference with Riemannian geometry is that not every differentiable manifold can admit a symplectic form; there are certain topological restrictions. For example, every symplectic manifold is even-dimensional and orientable. Additionally, if M is a closed symplectic manifold, then the 2nd de Rham cohomology group H^{2}(M) is nontrivial (even more - every even-dimensional cohomology group is nontrivial); this implies, for example, that the only n-sphere that admits a symplectic form is the 2-sphere.

A parallel that one can draw between the two subjects is the analogy between geodesics in Riemannian geometry and pseudoholomorphic curves in symplectic geometry. Geodesics are curves of shortest length (locally), while pseudoholomorphic curves are surfaces of minimal area. Both concepts play a fundamental role in their respective disciplines.

== Examples and structures ==
Every Kähler manifold is also a symplectic manifold. Well into the 1970s, symplectic experts were unsure whether any compact non-Kähler symplectic manifolds existed, but since then many examples have been constructed (the first was due to William Thurston); in particular, Robert Gompf has shown that every finitely presented group occurs as the fundamental group of some symplectic 4-manifold, in marked contrast with the Kähler case.

Most symplectic manifolds, one can say, are not Kähler; and so do not have an integrable complex structure compatible with the symplectic form. Mikhail Gromov, however, made the important observation that symplectic manifolds do admit an abundance of compatible almost complex structures, so that they satisfy all the axioms for a Kähler manifold except the requirement that the transition maps be holomorphic.

Gromov used the existence of almost complex structures on symplectic manifolds to develop a theory of pseudoholomorphic curves, which has led to a number of advancements in symplectic topology, including a class of symplectic invariants now known as Gromov–Witten invariants. Later, using the pseudoholomorphic curve technique Andreas Floer invented another important tool in symplectic geometry known as the Floer homology.

== See also ==
- Contact geometry
- Geometric mechanics
- Moment map
- Poisson geometry
- Symplectic duality
- Symplectic integration
- Symplectic resolution
- Symplectic vector space
