= List of things named after Joseph-Louis Lagrange =

Several concepts from mathematics and physics are named after the mathematician and astronomer Joseph-Louis Lagrange, as are a crater on the Moon and a street in Paris.

== Lagrangian ==
- Lagrangian analysis
- Lagrangian coordinates
- Lagrangian derivative
- Lagrangian drifter
- Lagrangian foliation
- Lagrangian Grassmannian
- Lagrangian intersection Floer homology
- Lagrangian mechanics
  - Relativistic Lagrangian mechanics
- Lagrangian (field theory)
- Lagrangian system
- Lagrangian mixing
- Lagrangian point
- Lagrangian relaxation
- Lagrangian submanifold
- Lagrangian subspace
- Nonlocal Lagrangian
- Proca lagrangian
- Special Lagrangian submanifold

== Lagrange ==
- Euler–Lagrange equation
- Green–Lagrange strain
- Lagrange bracket
- Lagrange–Bürmann formula
- Lagrange–d'Alembert principle
- Lagrange error bound
- Lagrange form
- Lagrange form of the remainder
- Lagrange interpolation
- Lagrange invariant
- Lagrange inversion theorem
- Lagrange multiplier
  - Augmented Lagrangian method
- Lagrange number
- Lagrange point colonization
- Lagrange polynomial
- Lagrange property
- Lagrange reversion theorem
- Lagrange resolvent
- Lagrange spectrum
- Lagrange stability
- Lagrange stream function
- Lagrange top
- Lagrange−Sylvester interpolation

== Lagrange's ==
- Lagrange's approximation theorem
- Lagrange's formula (disambiguation)
- Lagrange's identity
- Lagrange's identity (boundary value problem)
- Lagrange's mean value theorem
- Lagrange's notation
- Lagrange's theorem (group theory)
- Lagrange's theorem (number theory)
- Lagrange's four-square theorem
- Lagrange's trigonometric identities

== Non-mathematical ==
- Lagrange point colonization
- Lagrange (crater)
- Lagrange Island, Antarctica
- Lagrange Island, Western Australia
- Lagrange Bay, Western Australia
- Rue Lagrange, a street in Paris
- Via Giuseppe Luigi Lagrange, in Turin, the street where the house of his birth still stands.
- Lagrange, a character from the 2017 rhythm game Arcaea
