= Polarization (Lie algebra) =

In representation theory, polarization is the maximal totally isotropic subspace of a certain skew-symmetric bilinear form on a Lie algebra. The notion of polarization plays an important role in construction of irreducible unitary representations of some classes of Lie groups by means of the orbit method as well as in harmonic analysis on Lie groups and mathematical physics.

== Definition ==
Let $G$ be a Lie group, $\mathfrak{g}$ the corresponding Lie algebra and $\mathfrak{g}^*$ its dual. Let $\langle f,\,X\rangle$ denote the value of the linear form (covector) $f\in\mathfrak{g}^*$ on a vector $X\in\mathfrak{g}$. The subalgebra $\mathfrak{h}$ of the algebra $\mathfrak g$ is called subordinate of $f\in\mathfrak{g}^*$ if the condition

$$\forall X, Y\in\mathfrak{h}\ \langle f,\,[X,\,Y]\rangle = 0$$,

or, alternatively,

$$\langle f,\,[\mathfrak{h},\,\mathfrak{h}]\rangle = 0$$

is satisfied. Further, let the group $G$ act on the space $\mathfrak{g}^*$ via coadjoint representation $\mathrm{Ad}^*$. Let $\mathcal{O}_f$ be the orbit of such action which passes through the point $f$ and let $\mathfrak{g}^f$ be the Lie algebra of the stabilizer $\mathrm{Stab}(f)$ of the point $f$. A subalgebra $\mathfrak{h}\subset\mathfrak{g}$ subordinate of $f$ is called a polarization of the algebra $\mathfrak{g}$ with respect to $f$, or, more concisely, polarization of the covector $f$, if it has maximal possible dimensionality, namely

$$\dim\mathfrak{h} = \frac{1}{2}\left(\dim\,\mathfrak{g} + \dim\,\mathfrak{g}^f\right) = \dim\,\mathfrak{g} - \frac{1}{2}\dim\,\mathcal{O}_f$$.

== Pukanszky condition ==
The following condition was obtained by L. Pukanszky:

Let $\mathfrak{h}$ be the polarization of algebra $\mathfrak{g}$ with respect to covector $f$ and $\mathfrak{h}^\perp$ be its annihilator: $\mathfrak{h}^\perp := \{\lambda\in\mathfrak{g}^*|\langle\lambda,\,\mathfrak{h}\rangle = 0\}$. The polarization $\mathfrak{h}$ is said to satisfy the Pukanszky condition if

$$f + \mathfrak{h}^\perp\in\mathcal{O}_f.$$

L. Pukanszky has shown that this condition guaranties applicability of the Kirillov's orbit method initially constructed for nilpotent groups to more general case of solvable groups as well.

== Properties ==
- Polarization is the maximal totally isotropic subspace of the bilinear form $\langle f,\,[\cdot,\,\cdot]\rangle$ on the Lie algebra $\mathfrak{g}$.
- For some pairs $(\mathfrak{g},\,f)$ polarization may not exist.
- If the polarization does exist for the covector $f$, then it exists for every point of the orbit $\mathcal{O}_f$ as well, and if $\mathfrak{h}$ is the polarization for $f$, then $\mathrm{Ad}_g\mathfrak{h}$ is the polarization for $\mathrm{Ad}^*_g f$. Thus, the existence of the polarization is the property of the orbit as a whole.
- If the Lie algebra $\mathfrak{g}$ is completely solvable, it admits the polarization for any point $f\in\mathfrak{g}^*$.
- If $\mathcal{O}$ is the orbit of general position (i. e. has maximal dimensionality), for every point $f\in\mathcal{O}$ there exists solvable polarization.
