= Jean-Marie Souriau =

French mathematician

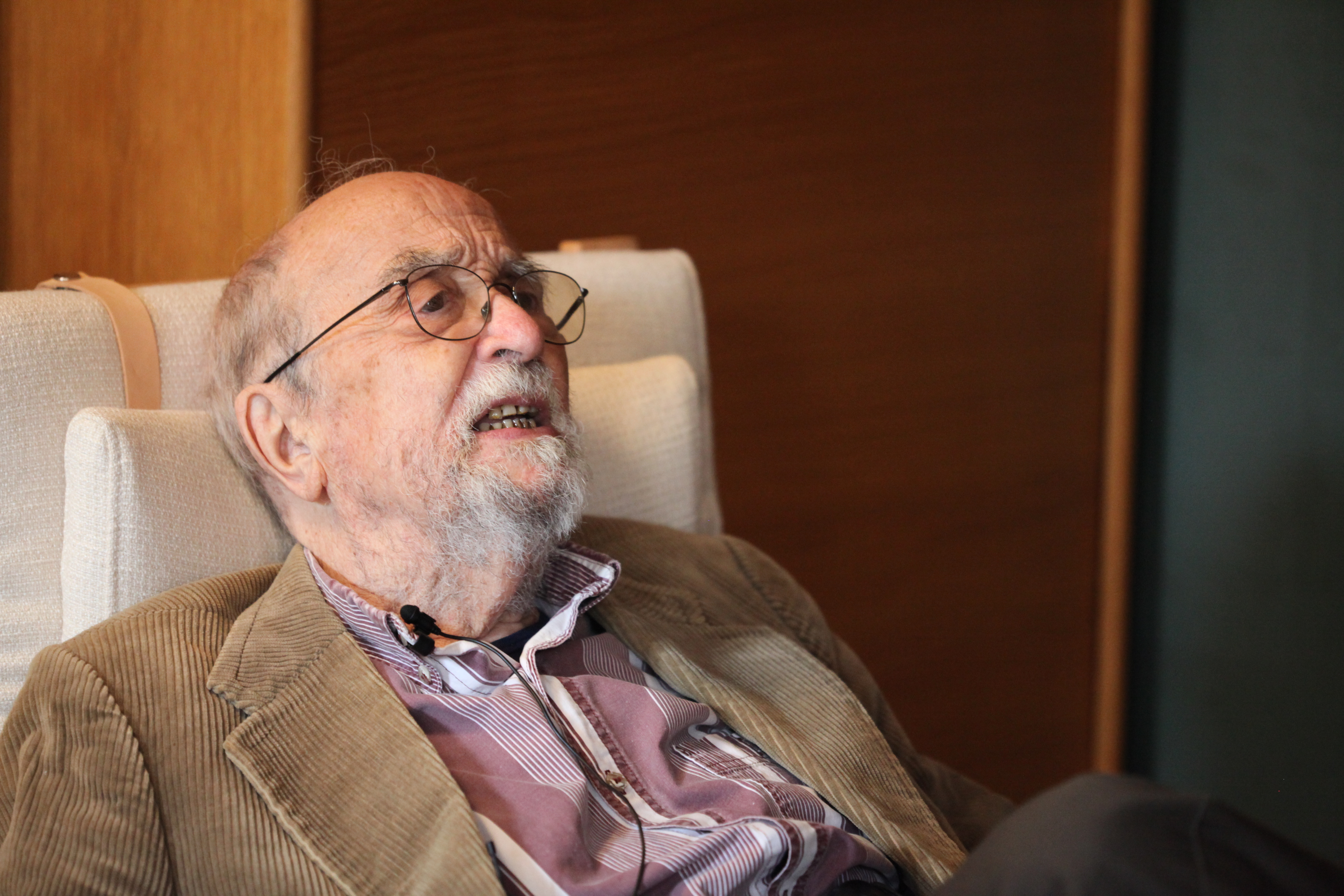
- Souriau in 2010
- Born: 3 June 1922; Paris, France
- Died: 15 March 2012 (aged 89); Aix-en-Provence, France
- Education: ONERA; École Normale Supérieure
- Known for: Diffeology; Geometric mechanics Geometric quantization Moment map Souriau cocycle Kostant–Kirillov–Souriau theorem Moment map
- Awards: Prix Jaffé (1981)
- Scientific career
- Fields: Mathematics
- Workplaces: University of Provence
- Thesis: Sur la stabilité des avions (1952)
- Doctoral advisor: Joseph Pérès; André Lichnerowicz
- Website: http://www.jmsouriau.com/

Jean-Marie Souriau (3 June 1922, Paris – 15 March 2012, Aix-en-Provence) was a French mathematician. He was one of the pioneers of modern symplectic geometry.

== Education and career ==
Souriau started studying mathematics in 1942 at École Normale Supérieure in Paris. In 1946 he was a research fellow of CNRS and an engineer at ONERA. His PhD thesis, defended in 1952 under the supervision of Joseph Pérès and André Lichnerowicz, was entitled "Sur la stabilité des avions" (On the stability of planes).

Between 1952 and 1958 he worked at Institut des Hautes Études in Tunis, and since 1958 he was Professor of Mathematics at the University of Provence in Marseille. In 1981 he was awarded the Prix Jaffé of the French Academy of Sciences.

== Research ==
Souriau contributed to the introduction and the development of many important concepts in symplectic geometry, arising from classical and quantum mechanics.

In particular, he introduced the notion of moment map, gave a classification of the homogeneous symplectic manifolds (now known as the Kirillov–Kostant–Souriau theorem), and investigated the coadjoint action of a Lie group, which led to the first geometric interpretation of spin at a classical level. He also suggested a program of geometric quantization and developed a more general approach to differentiable manifolds by means of diffeologies.

Souriau published more than 50 papers in peer-review scientific journals, as well as three monographs, on linear algebra, on relativity and on geometric mechanics. He supervised 10 PhD students.
