= Diffeology =

Concept in differential geometry

In mathematics, a diffeology on a set generalizes the concept of a smooth atlas of a differentiable manifold, by declaring only what constitutes the "smooth parametrizations" into the set. A diffeological space is a set equipped with a diffeology. Many of the standard tools of differential geometry extend to diffeological spaces, which beyond manifolds include arbitrary quotients of manifolds, arbitrary subsets of manifolds, and spaces of mappings between manifolds.

== Introduction ==
=== Calculus on "smooth spaces" ===
The differential calculus on $\mathbb{R}^n$, or, more generally, on real finite dimensional vector spaces, is one of the most impactful successes of modern mathematics. Fundamental to its basic definitions and theorems is the linear structure of the underlying space.

The field of differential geometry establishes and studies the extension of the classical differential calculus to non-linear spaces. This extension is made possible by the definition of a smooth manifold, which is also the starting point for diffeological spaces.

A smooth $n$-dimensional manifold (hereafter "manifold") is a set $M$ equipped with a maximal smooth atlas. This data is uniquely determined by a collection of injective functions, called local parametrizations, of the form $\phi\colon U \to M$, where $U$ is an open subset of $\mathbb{R}^n$, satisfying some mutual-compatibility relations (the inverse maps $\phi^{-1}\colon \phi(U) \to U$ are called charts). The local parametrizations of a manifold perform two distinct functions, which are often syncretized:

- They dictate the local structure of the manifold. The local parametrization $\phi\colon U \to M$ identifies its image in $M$ with its domain $U$. This is convenient because the latter is simply an open subset of a Euclidean space.
- They define the class of smooth maps between manifolds. These are the maps to which the differential calculus extends. In particular, the local parametrizations determine smooth functions (smooth maps $M \to \mathbb{R}$), smooth curves (smooth maps $[0,1] \to M$), smooth homotopies between curves (smooth maps $[0,1]^2 \to M$), etc.

A diffeology generalizes the structure of a smooth manifold by abandoning the first requirement for an atlas, namely that the local parametrizations give a local model of the space, while retaining the ability to discuss smooth maps into the space.

=== Informal definition ===
A diffeological space is a set $X$ equipped with a diffeology: a collection of maps
$$\{p\colon U \to X\mid U \text{ is an open subset of }\mathbb{R}^n, \text{ and } n \geq 0\},$$
whose members are called plots, that satisfies some axioms. The plots are not required to be injective, and can (indeed, must) have as domains the open subsets of arbitrary Euclidean spaces.

A smooth manifold can be viewed as a diffeological space which is locally diffeomorphic to $\mathbb{R}^n$. In general, while not giving local models for the space, the axioms of a diffeology still ensure that the plots induce a coherent notion of smooth functions, smooth curves, smooth homotopies, etc. Diffeology is therefore suitable to treat objects more general than manifolds.

=== Motivation ===
The primary motivation to generalize manifolds to diffeological spaces is that many spaces that arise in the course of study of manifolds are not themselves manifolds, but nevertheless carry canonical diffeologies; thus diffeology supplies geometric tools to handle these non-manifolds. Such spaces often arise in three ways: taking a subset of a manifold, taking a quotient of a manifold, and taking a collection of smooth maps between two manifolds.

An arbitrary subset of a manifold is not necessarily a submanifold. In categorical terms, this means the category of manifolds is not complete. The subset can fail to be a submanifold even when it is captured by relatively simple functions. For instance, the semi-cubic $\{(x,y) \in \mathbb{R}^2 \mid x^2=y^3\}$ is not an embedded submanifold of the plane $\mathbb{R}^2$, due to the cusp point at the origin. On the other hand, the category of diffeological spaces is complete, meaning that every subset of a diffeological space inherits a natural diffeology. The semi-cubic, as a diffeological space, is isomorphic to $\mathbb{R}$.

An arbitrary quotient of a manifold is not necessarily a manifold. In categorical terms, this means the category of manifolds is not co-complete. An example is the irrational torus $T_\alpha := \mathbb{R}/(\mathbb{Z} + \alpha \mathbb{Z})$, where $\alpha$ is a fixed irrational number. These irrational tori appear naturally: e.g. in geometric quantization they arise as the period groups of symplectic forms with non-integral cohomology. An irrational torus is not a manifold, because it carries the trivial topology. On the other hand, the category of diffeological spaces is co-complete, meaning that every quotient of a diffeological space inherits a natural diffeology. Two irrational tori, $T_\alpha$ and $T_\beta$, are isomorphic as diffeological spaces if and only if $\alpha$ and $\beta$ are related by a homography with integer coefficients.

Finally, the space of smooth maps $C^\infty(M,N)$ between manifolds $M$ and $N$ is not a (finite-dimensional) manifold when $M$ and $N$ have positive dimension. In categorical terms, this means the category of manifolds is not Cartesian closed. On the other hand, the category of diffeological spaces is Cartesian closed, meaning that every mapping space between diffeological spaces carries a natural diffeology. For $C^\infty(M,N)$, this diffeology is the collection of maps
$$\{p\colon U \to \mathcal{C}^\infty(M,N) \mid \text{ the map }U \times M \to N, \ (r,x) \mapsto p(r)(x) \text{ is smooth}\}.$$
With this structure, the diffeologically smooth curves from $[0,1]$ into $C^\infty(M,N)$ (a notion which is now rigorously defined) can be shown to correspond precisely to the smooth homotopies between smooth maps $M \to N$.

=== History ===
The concept of diffeology was first introduced by Jean-Marie Souriau in the 1980s in his paper on groupe différentiel. Souriau's motivating application for diffeology was to uniformly handle the infinite-dimensional groups arising from his work in geometric quantization. Thus the notion of diffeological group preceded the more general concept of a diffeological space. Souriau's diffeological program was taken up by his students, particularly Paul Donato and Patrick Iglesias-Zemmour, who completed early pioneering work in the field.

A structure similar to diffeology was introduced by Kuo-Tsaï Chen (陳國才, Chen Guocai) in the 1970s, in order to formalize certain computations with path integrals. Chen's definition used convex sets instead of open sets for the domains of the plots. The similarity between diffeological and "Chen" structures can be made precise by viewing both as concrete sheaves over the appropriate concrete site.

== Formal definition ==
A diffeology on a set $X$ consists of a collection of maps, called plots, from open subsets of $\mathbb{R}^n$ (for all $n \geq 0$) to $X$ such that the following axioms hold:

- Covering axiom: every constant map is a plot.
- Locality axiom: for a given map $p\colon U \to X$, if every point in $U$ has a neighborhood $V \subset U$ such that $p|_V$ is a plot, then $p$ itself is a plot.
- Smooth compatibility axiom: if $p$ is a plot, and $F$ is a smooth map from an open subset of some $\mathbb{R}^m$ into the domain of $p$, then the composite $p \circ F$ is a plot.

Note that the domains of different plots can be subsets of $\mathbb{R}^n$ for different values of $n$; in particular, any diffeology contains the constant maps $x: \mathbb{R}^0 \to X$, for all elements $x$ of the underlying set $X$, as the plots with $n = 0$. A set together with a diffeology is called a diffeological space.

More abstractly, a diffeological space is a concrete sheaf on the site of open subsets of $\mathbb{R}^n$, for all $n \geq 0$, and open covers.

=== Morphisms ===
A map between diffeological spaces is called smooth if and only if its composite with any plot of the first space is a plot of the second space. It is called a diffeomorphism if it is smooth, bijective, and its inverse is also smooth. Equipping the open subsets of Euclidean spaces with their standard diffeology (as defined in the next section), the plots into a diffeological space $X$ are precisely the smooth maps from $U$ to $X$.

Diffeological spaces constitute the objects of a category, denoted by $\mathsf{Dflg}$, whose morphisms are smooth maps. The category $\mathsf{Dflg}$ is closed under many categorical operations: for instance, it is Cartesian closed, complete and cocomplete, and more generally it is a quasitopos.

=== D-topology ===
Any diffeological space is a topological space when equipped with the D-topology: the final topology such that all plots are continuous (with respect to the Euclidean topology on $\mathbb{R}^n$).

In other words, a subset $U \subset X$ is open if and only if $p^{-1}(U)$ is open for any plot $p$ on $X$. Actually, the D-topology is completely determined by smooth curves, i.e., a subset $U \subset X$ is open if and only if $c^{-1}(U)$ is open for any smooth map $c\colon \mathbb{R} \to X$. The D-topology is automatically locally path-connected

A smooth map between diffeological spaces is automatically continuous between their D-topologies. Therefore we have the functor $D\colon \mathsf{Dflg} \to \mathsf{Top}$, from the category of diffeological spaces to the category of topological spaces, which assigns to a diffeological space its D-topology. This functor realizes $\mathsf{Dflg}$ as a concrete category over $\mathsf{Top}$.

=== Additional structures ===
A Cartan-De Rham calculus can be developed in the framework of diffeologies, as well as a suitable adaptation of the notions of fiber bundles, homotopy, etc. There are also several non-equivalent definitions of tangent spaces and tangent bundles for diffeological spaces.

== Examples ==
=== First examples ===
Any set with at least two elements carries at least two (different) diffeologies:

- the coarse (or trivial, or indiscrete) diffeology, consisting of every map into the set. This is the largest possible diffeology. The corresponding D-topology is the trivial topology.
- the discrete (or fine) diffeology, consisting of the locally constant maps into the set. This is the smallest possible diffeology. The corresponding D-topology is the discrete topology.

The empty set and any singleton admit a unique diffeology (the two diffeologies above coincide).

Any topological space can be endowed with the continuous diffeology, whose plots are the continuous maps.

The Euclidean space $\mathbb{R}^n$ admits several diffeologies beyond those listed above.

- The standard diffeology on $\mathbb{R}^n$ consists of those maps $p:U \to \mathbb{R}^n$ which are smooth in the usual sense of multivariable calculus.
- The wire (or spaghetti) diffeology on $\mathbb{R}^n$ is the diffeology whose plots factor locally through $\mathbb{R}$. Denote $\mathbb{R}^n$ equipped with the wire diffeology by $X$. A map $p\colon U \to X$ is a plot if and only if for every $u \in U$ there is an open neighbourhood $V \subseteq U$ of $u$ such that $p|_V = q \circ F$ for two smooth functions $F\colon V \to \mathbb{R}$ and $q\colon \mathbb{R} \to \mathbb{R}^n$. This diffeology does not coincide with the standard diffeology on $\mathbb{R}^n$ when $n\geq 2$: for instance, the identity $\mathbb{R}^n \to X$ is not a plot for the wire diffeology. Equivalently, the identity, viewed as a map from $\mathbb{R}^n$ with its standard structure to $X$, is not smooth.
- The previous example can be enlarged to diffeologies whose plots factor locally through $\mathbb{R}^r$, yielding the rank-$r$-restricted diffeology on a smooth manifold $M$: a map $U \to M$ is a plot if and only if it is smooth and the rank of its differential is less than or equal than $r$. For $r=1$ one recovers the wire diffeology.

=== Relation to other smooth spaces ===
Diffeological spaces generalize manifolds, but they are far from the only mathematical objects to do so. For instance manifolds with corners, orbifolds, and Fréchet manifolds are all well-established alternatives. This subsection makes precise the extent to which these spaces are diffeological.

We view $\mathsf{Dflg}$ as a concrete category over the category of topological spaces $\mathsf{Top}$ via the D-topology functor $D\colon\mathsf{Dflg} \to \mathsf{Top}$. If $U\colon \mathsf{C} \to \mathsf{Top}$ is another concrete category over $\mathsf{Top}$, we say that a functor $E\colon \mathsf{C} \to \mathsf{Dflg}$ is an embedding (of concrete categories) if it is injective on objects and faithful, and $D \circ E = U$. To specify an embedding, we need only describe it on objects; it is necessarily the identity map on arrows.

We will say that a diffeological space $X$ is locally modeled by a collection of diffeological spaces $\mathcal{E}$ if around every point $x \in X$, there is a D-open neighbourhood $U$, a D-open subset $V$ of some $E \in \mathcal{E}$, and a diffeological diffeomorphism $U \to V$.

==== Manifolds ====
The category of finite-dimensional smooth manifolds (allowing those with connected components of different dimensions) fully embeds into $\mathsf{Dflg}$. The embedding $y$ assigns to a smooth manifold $M$ the canonical diffeology
$$\{p\colon U \to M \mid p \text{ is smooth in the usual sense}\}.$$
In particular, a diffeologically smooth map between manifolds is smooth in the usual sense, and the D-topology of $y(M)$ is the original topology of $M$. The essential image of this embedding consists of those diffeological spaces that are locally modeled by the collection $\{y(\mathbb{R}^n)\}$, and whose D-topology is Hausdorff and second-countable.

==== Manifolds with boundary or corners ====
The category of finite-dimensional smooth manifolds with boundary (allowing those with connected components of different dimensions) similarly fully embeds into $\mathsf{Dflg}$. The embedding is defined identically to the smooth case, except "smooth in the usual sense" refers to the standard definition of smooth maps between manifolds with boundary. The essential image of this embedding consists of those diffeological spaces that are locally modeled by the collection $\{y(O) \mid O \text{ is a half-space}\}$, and whose D-topology is Hausdorff and second-countable. The same can be done in more generality for manifolds with corners, using the collection $\{y(O) \mid O \text{ is an orthant}\}$.

==== Fréchet and Banach manifolds ====
The category of Fréchet manifolds similarly fully embeds into $\mathsf{Dflg}$. Once again, the embedding is defined identically to the smooth case, except "smooth in the usual sense" refers to the standard definition of smooth maps between Fréchet spaces. The essential image of this embedding consists of those diffeological spaces that are locally modeled by the collection $\{y(E) \mid E \text{ is a Fréchet space}\}$, and whose D-topology is Hausdorff.

The embedding restricts to one of the category of Banach manifolds. Historically, the case of Banach manifolds was proved first, by Hain, and the case of Fréchet manifolds was treated later, by Losik. The category of manifolds modeled on convenient vector spaces also similarly embeds into $\mathsf{Dflg}$.

==== Orbifolds ====
A (classical) orbifold $X$ is a space that is locally modeled by quotients of the form $\mathbb{R}^n/\Gamma$, where $\Gamma$ is a finite subgroup of linear transformations. On the other hand, each model $\mathbb{R}^n/\Gamma$ is naturally a diffeological space (with the quotient diffeology discussed below), and therefore the (inverse of the) orbifold charts generate a diffeology on $X$. This diffeology is uniquely determined by the orbifold structure of $X$.

Conversely, a diffeological space that is locally modeled by the collection $\{\mathbb{R}^n/\Gamma\}$ (and with Hausdorff D-topology) carries a classical orbifold structure that induces the original diffeology, wherein the local diffeomorphisms are the (the inverses of the) orbifold charts. Such a space is called a diffeological orbifold.

Whereas diffeological orbifolds automatically have a notion of smooth map between them (namely diffeologically smooth maps in $\mathsf{Dflg}$), the notion of a smooth map between classical orbifolds is not standardized.

If orbifolds are viewed as differentiable stacks presented by étale proper Lie groupoids, then there is a functor from the underlying 1-category of orbifolds, and equivalent maps-of-stacks between them, to $\mathsf{Dflg}$. Its essential image consists of diffeological orbifolds, but the functor is neither faithful nor full.

== Constructions ==
=== Intersections ===
If a set $X$ is given two different diffeologies, their intersection is a diffeology on $X$, called the intersection diffeology, which is finer than both starting diffeologies. The D-topology of the intersection diffeology is finer than the intersection of the D-topologies of the original diffeologies.

=== Products ===
If $X$ and $Y$ are diffeological spaces, then the product diffeology on the Cartesian product $X \times Y$ is the diffeology generated by all products of plots of $X$ and of $Y$. Precisely, a map $p\colon U \to X \times Y$ necessarily has the form $p(u) = (x(u),y(u))$ for maps $x\colon U \to X$ and $y\colon U \to Y$. The map $p$ is a plot in the product diffeology if and only if $x$ and $y$ are plots of $X$ and $Y$, respectively. This generalizes to products of arbitrary collections of spaces.

The D-topology of $X \times Y$ is the coarsest delta-generated topology containing the product topology of the D-topologies of $X$ and $Y$; it is equal to the product topology when $X$ or $Y$ is locally compact, but may be finer in general.

=== Coproducts ===
If $X$ and $Y$ are diffeological spaces, then the coproduct diffeology on the disjoint union $X \amalg Y$ is the diffeology consisting of all parametrizations that are locally a plot of $X$ or of $Y$. Precisely, a map $p\colon U \to X \amalg Y$ is a plot in the coproduct diffeology if and only if around every point in $U$, there is a neighbourhood on which $p$ restricts to a plot of either $X$ or of $Y$.

The D-topology of $X \amalg Y$ is the disjoint union of the D-topologies of $X$ and $Y$.

=== Pullbacks ===
Given a map $f\colon X \to Y$ from a set $X$ to a diffeological space $Y$, the pullback diffeology on $X$ consists of those maps $p\colon U \to X$ such that the composition $f \circ p$ is a plot of $Y$. In other words, the pullback diffeology is the smallest diffeology on $X$ making $f$ smooth.

If $X$ is a subset of the diffeological space $Y$, then the subspace diffeology on $X$ is the pullback diffeology induced by the inclusion $X \hookrightarrow Y$. In this case, the D-topology of $X$ is equal to the subspace topology of the D-topology of $Y$ if $Y$ is open, but may be finer in general.

=== Pushforwards ===
Given a map $f\colon X \to Y$ from diffeological space $X$ to a set $Y$, the pushforward diffeology on $Y$ is the diffeology generated by the compositions $f \circ p$, for plots $p\colon U \to X$ of $X$. In other words, the pushforward diffeology is the smallest diffeology on $Y$ making $f$ smooth.

If $X$ is a diffeological space and $\sim$ is an equivalence relation on $X$, then the quotient diffeology on the quotient set $X/{\sim}$ is the pushforward diffeology induced by the quotient map $X \to X/{\sim}$. The D-topology on $X/{\sim}$ is the quotient topology of the D-topology of $X$. Note that this topology may be trivial without the diffeology being trivial.

Quotients often give rise to non-manifold diffeologies. For example, the set of real numbers $\mathbb{R}$ is a smooth manifold. The quotient $\mathbb{R}/(\mathbb{Z} + \alpha \mathbb{Z})$, for some irrational $\alpha$, called the irrational torus, is a diffeological space diffeomorphic to the quotient of the regular 2-torus $\mathbb{R}^2/\mathbb{Z}^2$ by a line of slope $\alpha$. It has a non-trivial diffeology, although its D-topology is the trivial topology.

=== Functional diffeologies ===
The functional diffeology on the set $\mathcal{C}^{\infty}(X,Y)$ of smooth maps between two diffeological spaces $X$ and $Y$ is the diffeology whose plots are the maps $p\colon U \to \mathcal{C}^{\infty}(X,Y)$ such that
$$U \times X \to Y, \quad (u,x) \mapsto p(u)(x)$$
is smooth with respect to the product diffeology of $U \times X$. When $X$ and $Y$ are manifolds, the D-topology of $\mathcal{C}^{\infty}(X,Y)$ is the smallest locally path-connected topology containing the Whitney $C^\infty$ topology.

Taking the subspace diffeology of a functional diffeology, one can define diffeologies on the space of sections of a fibre bundle, or the space of bisections of a Lie groupoid, etc.

If $M$ is a compact smooth manifold, and $F \to M$ is a smooth fiber bundle over $M$, then the space of smooth sections $\Gamma(F)$ of the bundle is frequently equipped with the structure of a Fréchet manifold. Upon embedding this Fréchet manifold into the category of diffeological spaces, the resulting diffeology coincides with the subspace diffeology that $\Gamma(F)$ inherits from the functional diffeology on $\mathcal{C}^\infty(M,F)$.

== Distinguished maps ==
Analogous to the notions of submersions and immersions between manifolds, there are two special classes of morphisms between diffeological spaces. A subduction is a surjective function $f\colon X \to Y$ between diffeological spaces such that the diffeology of $Y$ is the pushforward of the diffeology of $X$. Similarly, an induction is an injective function $f\colon X \to Y$ between diffeological spaces such that the diffeology of $X$ is the pullback of the diffeology of $Y$. Subductions and inductions are automatically smooth.

It is instructive to consider the case where $X$ and $Y$ are smooth manifolds.

- Every surjective submersion $f\colon X \to Y$ is a subduction.
- A subduction need not be a surjective submersion. One example is
  $$f\colon \mathbb{R}^2 \to \mathbb{R}, \quad f(x,y) := xy.$$
- An injective immersion need not be an induction. One example is the parametrization of the "figure-eight,"
  $$f\colon \left(-\frac{\pi}{2}, \frac{3\pi}{2}\right) \to \mathbb{R^2}, \quad f(t) := (2\cos(t), \sin(2t)).$$
- An induction need not be an injective immersion. One example is the "semi-cubic,"
  $$f\colon \mathbb{R} \to \mathbb{R}^2, \quad f(t) := (t^2, t^3).$$

In the category of diffeological spaces, subductions are precisely the strong epimorphisms, and inductions are precisely the strong monomorphisms. A map that is both a subduction and induction is a diffeomorphism.
