= Presymplectic form =

Closed degenerate differential 2-form of constant rank

In mathematical physics, especially geometric mechanics, a presymplectic form is a geometric structure on differentiable manifolds. It is a generalization of symplectic form.

Given a differentiable manifold, a symplectic form over it is differential 2-form that is closed and nondegenerate. A presymplectic form relaxes the requirement for nondegeneracy. Instead, it is merely required to be closed and have constant rank at all points on the manifold. Note that a symplectic form, by virtue of nondegeneracy, necessarily have rank equaling the dimension of the underlying manifold, so it has constant rank.

The definition is not standardized. Recently, Hajduk and Walczak defined a presymplectic form as a closed, differential 2-form, of maximal rank on a manifold of odd dimension. This may be motivated thus: A symplectic form necessarily exists over a manifold of even dimension, so a manifold of odd dimension cannot have a symplectic form. However, it can at least attempt to reach a rank as high as possible, since a symplectic form, by virtue of nondegeneracy, necessarily have rank equaling the dimension of the underlying manifold, which is the maximal rank possible on the manifold.

== Applications ==
Presymplectic forms have been used to study physical systems where there is no obvious symplectic geometry underlying it. Examples include dynamical systems with singular Lagrangians, Hamiltonian systems with constraints, and control theory.
