= Kirillov character formula =

Formula from representation theory

In mathematics, for a Lie group $G$, the Kirillov orbit method gives a heuristic method in representation theory. It connects the Fourier transforms of coadjoint orbits, which lie in the dual space of the Lie algebra of G, to the infinitesimal characters of the irreducible representations. The method got its name after the Russian mathematician Alexandre Kirillov.

At its simplest, it states that a character of a Lie group may be given by the Fourier transform of the Dirac delta function supported on the coadjoint orbits, weighted by the square-root of the Jacobian of the exponential map, denoted by $j$. It does not apply to all Lie groups, but works for a number of classes of connected Lie groups, including nilpotent, some semisimple groups, and compact groups.

The Kirillov orbit method has led to a number of important developments in Lie theory, including the Duflo isomorphism and the wrapping map.

== Character formula for compact Lie groups ==
Let $\lambda \in \mathfrak{t}^*$ be the highest weight of an irreducible representation $\pi$, where $\mathfrak{t}^*$ is the dual of the Lie algebra of the maximal torus, and let $\rho$ be half the sum of the positive roots.

We denote by $\mathcal{O}_{\lambda + \rho}$ the coadjoint orbit through $\lambda + \rho \in \mathfrak{t}^*$ and by $\mu_{\lambda + \rho}$ the $G$-invariant measure on $\mathcal{O}_{\lambda + \rho}$ with total mass $\dim \pi = d_\lambda$, known as the Liouville measure. If $\chi_\lambda$ is the character of the representation, the Kirillov's character formula for compact Lie groups is given by

$$j^{1/2}(X) \chi_\lambda (\exp X) = \int_{\mathcal{O}_{\lambda + \rho}} e^{i\beta (X)}d\mu_{\lambda + \rho} (\beta), \; \forall \; X \in \mathfrak{g}$$,

where $j(X)$ is the Jacobian of the exponential map.

== Example: SU(2) ==
For the case of SU(2), the highest weights are the positive half integers, and $\rho = 1/2$. The coadjoint orbits are the two-dimensional spheres of radius $\lambda + 1/2$, centered at the origin in 3-dimensional space.

By the theory of Bessel functions, it may be shown that

$$\int_{\mathcal{O}_{\lambda + 1/2}} e^{i\beta (X)}d\mu_{\lambda + 1/2} (\beta) = \frac{\sin((2\lambda + 1)X)}{X/2}, \; \forall \; X \in \mathfrak{g},$$

and

$$j(X) = \frac{\sin X/2}{X/2}$$

thus yielding the characters of SU(2):

$$\chi_\lambda (\exp X) = \frac{\sin((2\lambda + 1)X)}{\sin X/2}$$

== See also ==
- Weyl character formula
- Localization formula for equivariant cohomology
