= Quantization commutes with reduction =

In mathematics, more specifically in the context of geometric quantization, quantization commutes with reduction states that the space of global sections of a line bundle L satisfying the quantization condition on the symplectic quotient of a compact symplectic manifold is the space of invariant sections of L.

This was conjectured in 1980s by Guillemin and Sternberg and was proven in 1990s by Meinrenken (the second paper used symplectic cut) as well as Tian and Zhang. For the formulation due to Teleman, see C. Woodward's notes.

== See also ==
- Geometric invariant theory
