= Jan Plefka =

German theoretical physicist

Jan Christoph Plefka (born 31 January 1968 in Hanau) is a German theoretical physicist working in the field of quantum field theory and string theory.

== Education ==
After receiving the Abitur in Darmstadt and performing civil service in a hospital, Plefka studied physics at the Technical University of Darmstadt and Texas A&M University where he received his M.Sc. as a Fulbright Scholar. He received his PhD from the Leibniz University Hannover with a dissertation on supersymmetric matrix models in 1995. In 2003 he received the Habilitation at the Humboldt University Berlin.

== Career ==
After postdoctoral work at the City College New York and Nikhef Amsterdam, he became a Junior Staff Member at the Albert Einstein Institute, Max Planck Institute for Gravitational Physics in 1998. In 2006, Plefka was awarded a Lichtenberg Professorship of the Volkswagen Foundation in quantum field and string theory at the Institute of Physics at Humboldt University Berlin, becoming Full Professor there in 2011. In 2014 he held a Visiting Professorship at the Institute for Theoretical Physics at the ETH Zurich. His research focuses on theoretical high energy and gravitational physics, in particular the AdS/CFT correspondence and hidden symmetries in quantum field theory. His most influential work is the discovery of a hidden Yangian symmetry of scattering amplitudes in N = 4 supersymmetric Yang–Mills theory together with James M. Drummond and Johannes Henn. He has co-authored a text book on scattering amplitudes in gauge theories which is the first topical book on modern on-shell techniques for scattering amplitudes.

== Selected further publications ==
- Plefka, J. (2005). "Spinning strings and integrable spin chains in the AdS/CFT correspondence". Living Reviews in Relativity. 2005 (8): 9. arXiv:hep-th/0507136. Bibcode:2005LRR.....8....9P. doi:10.12942/lrr-2005-9. PMC 5253969. PMID 28163650.
- Alday, J. F.; Henn, J. M.; Plefka, J.; Schuster, T. (January 2010). "Scattering into the fifth dimension of N=4 super Yang-Mills". Journal of High Energy Physics. 2010 (77): 077. arXiv:0908.0684. doi:10.1007/JHEP01(2010)077. S2CID 15727109.
