= Geometric mechanics =

Branch of mathematics

Geometric mechanics is a branch of mathematics applying particular geometric methods to many areas of mechanics, from mechanics of particles and rigid bodies to fluid mechanics and control theory.

Geometric mechanics applies principally to systems for which the configuration space is a Lie group, or a group of diffeomorphisms, or more generally where some aspect of the configuration space has this group structure. For example, the configuration space of a rigid body such as a satellite is the group of Euclidean motions (translations and rotations in space), while the configuration space for a liquid crystal is the group of diffeomorphisms coupled with an internal state (gauge symmetry or order parameter).

== Momentum map and reduction ==
One of the principal ideas of geometric mechanics is reduction, which goes back to Jacobi's elimination of the node in the 3-body problem, but in its modern form is due to K. Meyer (1973) and independently J.E. Marsden and A. Weinstein (1974), both inspired by the work of Smale (1970). Symmetry of a Hamiltonian or Lagrangian system gives rise to conserved quantities, by Noether's theorem, and these conserved quantities are the components of the momentum map J. If P is the phase space and G the symmetry group, the momentum map is a map $\mathbf{J}:P\to\mathfrak{g}^*$, and the reduced spaces are quotients of the level sets of J by the subgroup of G preserving the level set in question: for $\mu\in\mathfrak{g}^*$ one defines $P_\mu=\mathbf{J}^{-1}(\mu)/G_\mu$, and this reduced space is a symplectic manifold if $\mu$ is a regular value of J.

== Variational principles ==
- Hamilton's principle
- Lagrange d'Alembert principle
- Maupertuis' principle of least action
- Euler–Poincaré
- Vakonomic

== Geometric integrators ==
One of the important developments arising from the geometric approach to mechanics is the incorporation of the geometry into numerical methods. In particular symplectic and variational integrators are proving particularly accurate for long-term integration of Hamiltonian and Lagrangian systems.

== History ==
The term "geometric mechanics" occasionally refers to 17th-century mechanics.

As a modern subject, geometric mechanics has its roots in four works written in the 1960s. These were by Vladimir Arnold (1966), Stephen Smale (1970) and Jean-Marie Souriau (1970), and the first edition of Abraham and Marsden's Foundation of Mechanics (1967). Arnold's fundamental work showed that Euler's equations for the free rigid body are the equations for geodesic flow on the rotation group SO(3) and carried this geometric insight over to the dynamics of ideal fluids, where the rotation group is replaced by the group of volume-preserving diffeomorphisms. Smale's paper on Topology and Mechanics investigates the conserved quantities arising from Noether's theorem when a Lie group of symmetries acts on a mechanical system, and defines what is now called the momentum map (which Smale calls angular momentum), and he raises questions about the topology of the energy-momentum level surfaces and the effect on the dynamics. In his book, Souriau also considers the conserved quantities arising from the action of a group of symmetries, but he concentrates more on the geometric structures involved (for example the equivariance properties of this momentum for a wide class of symmetries), and less on questions of dynamics.

These ideas, and particularly those of Smale were central in the second edition of Foundations of Mechanics (Abraham and Marsden, 1978).

== Applications ==
- Computer graphics
- Control theory — see Bloch (2003)
- Liquid Crystals — see Gay-Balmaz, Ratiu, Tronci (2013)
- Magnetohydrodynamics
- Molecular oscillations
- Nonholonomic constraints — see Bloch (2003)
- Nonlinear stability
- Plasmas — see Holm, Marsden, Weinstein (1985)
- Quantum mechanics
- Quantum chemistry — see Foskett, Holm, Tronci (2019)
- Superfluids
- Thermodynamics — see Gay-Balmaz, Yoshimra (2018)
- Trajectory planning for space exploration
- Underwater vehicles
- Variational integrators; see Marsden and West (2001)
