= Lagrange stability =

Lagrange stability is a concept in the stability theory of dynamical systems, named after Joseph-Louis Lagrange.

For any point in the state space, $x \in M$ in a real continuous dynamical system $(T,M,\Phi)$, where $T$ is $\mathbb{R}$, the motion $\Phi(t,x)$ is said to be positively Lagrange stable if the positive semi-orbit $\gamma_x^+$ is compact. If the negative semi-orbit $\gamma_x^-$ is compact, then the motion is said to be negatively Lagrange stable. The motion through $x$ is said to be Lagrange stable if it is both positively and negatively Lagrange stable. If the state space $M$ is the Euclidean space $\mathbb{R}^n$, then the above definitions are equivalent to $\gamma_x^+, \gamma_x^-$ and $\gamma_x$ being bounded, respectively.

A dynamical system is said to be positively-/negatively-/Lagrange stable if for each $x \in M$, the motion $\Phi(t,x)$ is positively-/negatively-/Lagrange stable, respectively.
