= Alexander Molev =

Russian-Australian mathematician

Alexander Ivanovich Molev (Russian: Алекса́ндр Ива́нович Мо́лев) FAA (born 1961) is a Russian-Australian mathematician.

He completed his Ph.D. in 1986 under the supervision of Alexandre Kirillov at Moscow State University. He was awarded the Australian Mathematical Society Medal in 2001 and became a Fellow of the Australian Academy of Science in 2019.

Amongst other things, he has worked on Yangians and Lie algebras.

He is currently a Professor in the School of Mathematics and Statistics, Faculty of Science, University of Sydney.

== Bibliography ==
- Alexander Molev, Yangians and classical Lie algebras, Mathematical Surveys and Monographs, 143. American Mathematical Society, Providence, RI, 2007. xviii+400 pp. ISBN 978-0-8218-4374-1
- Alexander Molev, Sugawara Operators for Classical Lie Algebras, Mathematical Surveys and Monographs, 229. American Mathematical Society, Providence, RI, 2018 304 pp. ISBN 978-1-4704-3659-9
- Molev, A.I. Feigin-Frenkel center in types B, C and D. Invent. math. 191, 1-34 (2013). https://doi.org/10.1007/s00222-012-0390-7
