= Joseph Pérès =

French mathematician (1890–1962)

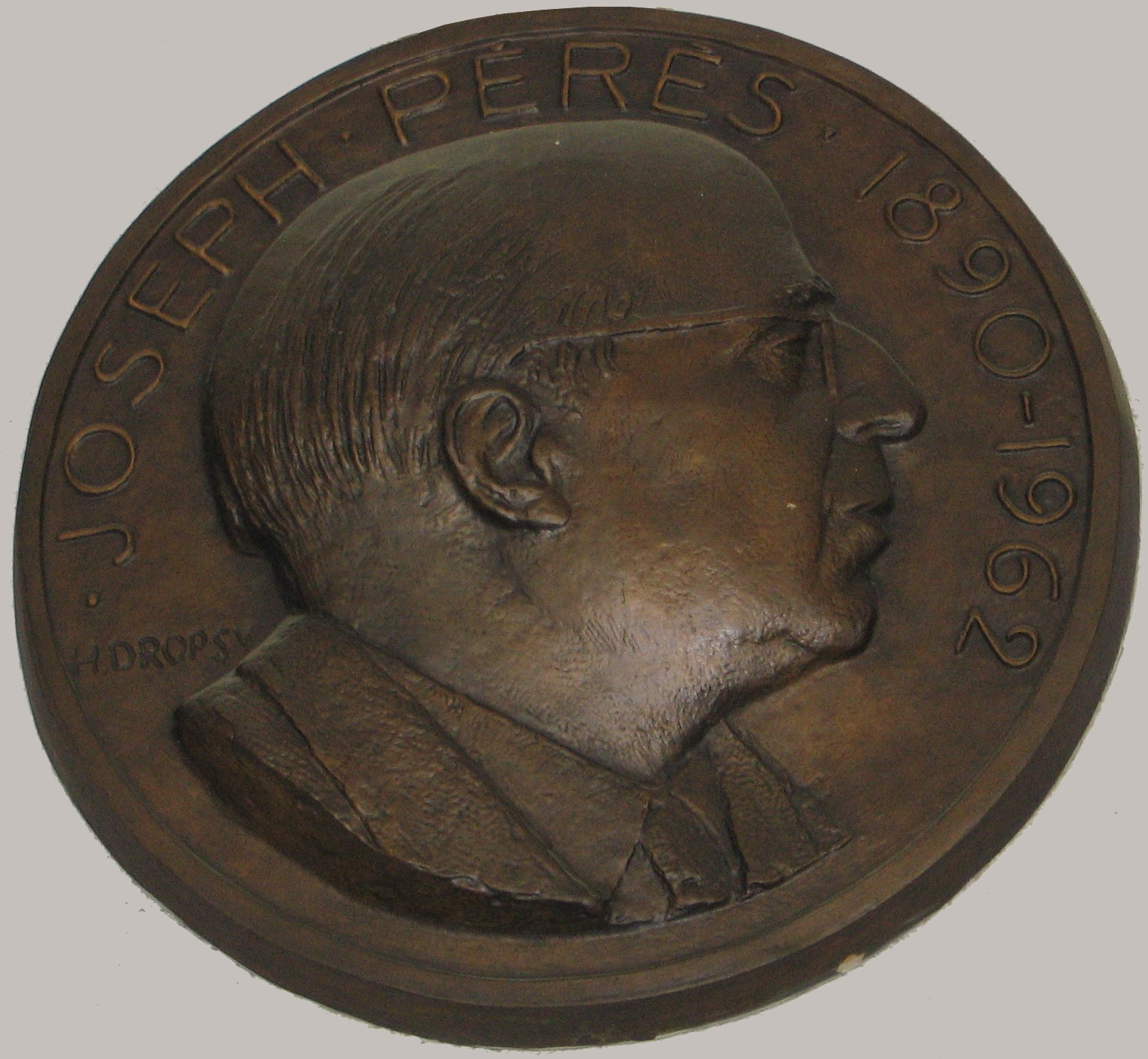
- Born: 31 October 1890; Clermont-Ferrand
- Died: 12 February 1962 (aged 71)
- Education: Ecole Normale Superieure
- Awards: ICM Speaker (1932)
- Scientific career
- Fields: Mathematics
- Notable students: Jean-Marie Souriau

Joseph Pérès (31 October 1890 – 12 February 1962) was a French mathematician.

== Early life and education ==
Pérès was born in Clermont-Ferrand on 31 October 1890. Former student of the Ecole Normale Superieure, he worked in Rome with Vito Volterra and defended his doctoral thesis in 1915.

== Career ==
In 1920, he became a lecturer at the Faculty of Sciences of Strasbourg and in 1921 held the mechanics chair of the faculty of sciences of Marseille.

In 1932, he was appointed lecturer at the Faculty of Paris. He was elected member of the Academy of Sciences in 1942. He held the chair of mechanics in 1950 and Dean of the Faculty of Science in 1954, succeeding Albert Châtelet. During his deanship, he undertakes the creation of the Orsay campus. He was also one of the founders of the Institut des Hautes Études Scientifiques and its first président until his death.

== Selected publications ==
=== Articles ===
- Pérès, Joseph (1919), "Le parallélisme de Mr. Levi-Civita et la courbure riemannienne", Rendiconti della Reale Accademia dei Lincei, (Serie 5) (in Italian), 28: 425–428
- "Sur les transformations qui conservent la composition." Bull. Soc. Math. France 47 (1919): 16–37.
- "Choc en tenant compte du frottement." Nouvelles annales de mathématiques: journal des candidats aux écoles polytechnique et normale 2 (1923): 98–107.
- "Contribution à l'étude des jets fluides." Journal de Mathématiques Pures et Appliquées 11 (1932): 57–66.

=== Books ===
- Volterra, Vito; Pérès, Joseph (1936). Théorie générale des fonctionnelles. Paris: Gauthier-Villars.
- Joseph Pérès (1936). Mécanique des Fluides. Gauthier-Villars; published with the collaboration of Lucien Malavard
