= Fedosov manifold =

In mathematics, a Fedosov manifold is a symplectic manifold with a compatible torsion-free connection, that is, a triple (M, ω, ∇), where (M, ω) is a symplectic manifold (that is, $\omega$ is a symplectic form, a non-degenerate closed exterior 2-form, on a $C^{\infty}$-manifold M), and ∇ is a symplectic torsion-free connection on $M.$ (A connection ∇ is called compatible or symplectic if X ⋅ ω(Y,Z) = ω(∇_{X}Y,Z) + ω(Y,∇_{X}Z) for all vector fields X,Y,Z ∈ Γ(TM). In other words, the symplectic form is parallel with respect to the connection, i.e., its covariant derivative vanishes.) Note that every symplectic manifold admits a symplectic torsion-free connection. Cover the manifold with Darboux charts and on each chart define a connection ∇ with Christoffel symbol $\Gamma^i_{jk}=0$. Then choose a partition of unity (subordinate to the cover) and glue the local connections together to a global connection which still preserves the symplectic form. The famous result of Boris Vasilievich Fedosov gives a canonical deformation quantization of a Fedosov manifold.

== Examples ==
For example, $\R^{2n}$ with the standard symplectic form $dx_i \wedge dy_i$ has the symplectic connection given by the exterior derivative $d.$ Hence, $\left(\R^{2n}, \omega, d\right)$ is a Fedosov manifold.
