= Lagrangian foliation =

Foliation of symplectic manifolds

In mathematics, a Lagrangian foliation or polarization is a foliation of a symplectic manifold, whose leaves are Lagrangian submanifolds. It is one of the steps involved in the geometric quantization of a square-integrable functions on a symplectic manifold.
