= Lagrange point colonization =

Colonization of five equilibrium points in the orbit of planets or moons

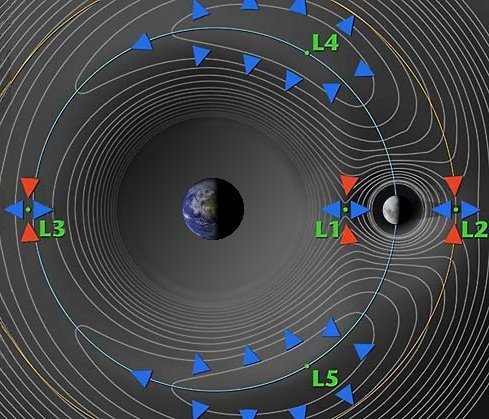
A diagram showing the five Lagrange points in a two-body system, with one body far more massive than the other (e.g. Earth and Moon). In this system L_{3}–L_{5} will appear to share the secondary's orbit, although they are situated slightly outside it.

Lagrange point colonization is a proposed form of space colonization of the five equilibrium points in the orbit of a planet or its primary moon, called Lagrange points.

The Lagrange points L_{4} and L_{5} are stable if the mass of the larger body is at least 25 times the mass of the secondary body. Thus, the points L_{4} and L_{5} in the Earth–Moon system have been proposed as possible sites for space colonies. The L5 Society was founded to promote settlement by building space stations at these points.

Gerard K. O'Neill suggested in 1974 that the Earth–Moon L_{5} point, in particular, could fit several thousands of floating colonies, and would allow easy travel to and from the colonies due to the shallow effective potential at this point. A contemporary NASA team estimated that a 500,000-tonne colony would cost US$5.1 billion (equivalent to US$33 billion in 2025) to build.

O'Neill proposed manufacturing large cylinders or spheres as colony habitats, while others proposed an enclosed torus shape or a huge ring without a "roof". Another approach is to move an asteroid to a Lagrange point with a colony in its hollow interior.

== See also ==
- Interplanetary Transport Network
- Lissajous orbit
