= Lajos Pukánszky =

Lajos Pukánszky (1928-1996) was a Hungarian and American mathematician noted for his work in representation theory of solvable Lie groups. He was born in Budapest on November 24, 1928, defended his thesis in 1955 at the University of Szeged under Béla Szőkefalvi-Nagy, but left Hungary in 1956. After taking several posts in the United States (at the Research Institute of Advanced Studies in Baltimore, the University of Maryland, College Park, Stanford University, UCLA), in 1965 he became a professor at the University of Pennsylvania, where he stayed until his retirement. He gave an invited address at the International Congress of Mathematicians in Nice in 1970. In 1988 a conference entitled "The Orbit Method in Representation Theory" was held at the University of Copenhagen in honor of his sixtieth birthday. He died on February 15, 1996, in Philadelphia.

== Scientific work ==
Pukánszky's early work concerned von Neumann algebras and related subjects. In 1956 he constructed two nonisomorphic factors of type III. A bulk of his later work was devoted to the unitary representation theory of solvable Lie groups. He found a geometric condition, known as the Pukánszky condition, that allowed an extension of the orbit method from nilpotent to solvable Lie groups and played a major role in the subsequent development of the theory. Later he considered unitary representations of general separable locally compact groups and, in particular, gave a characterization for their being CCR groups or type I groups.

== Selected papers ==
- Unitary representations of solvable Lie groups, Ann. Sci. École Norm. Sup. 4 (1971), 457–608
- Characters of connected Lie groups, Acta Math. 133 (1974), 81–137
