= Joseph-Louis Lagrange =

Italian-French scientist (1736–1813)

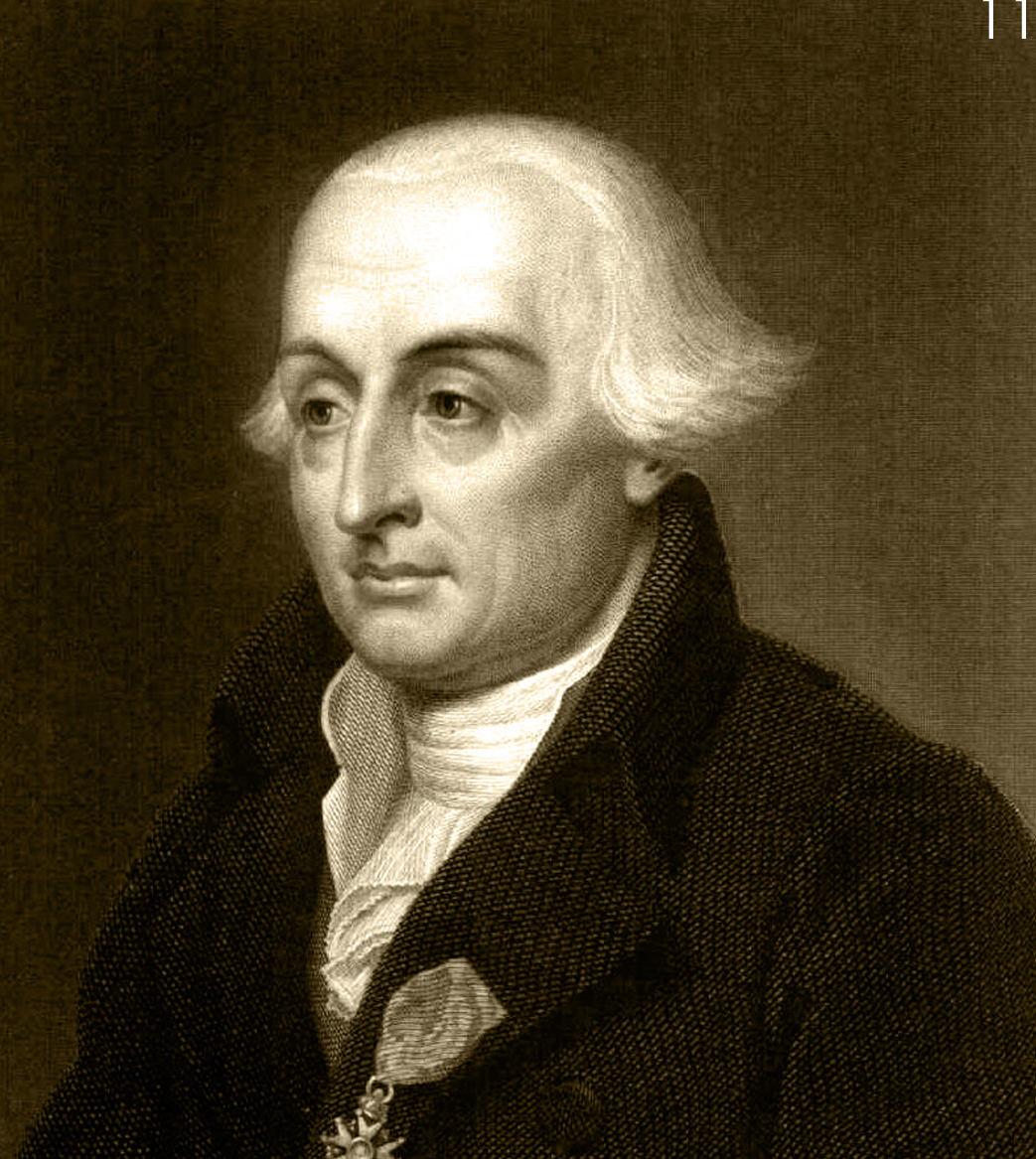
- Born: Giuseppe Lodovico Lagrangia; 25 January 1736; Turin, Kingdom of Sardinia
- Died: 10 April 1813 (aged 77); Paris, First French Empire
- Citizenship: Sardinia; French Empire
- Education: University of Turin
- Known for: (See list); Analytical mechanics; Calculus of variations; Celestial mechanics; Mathematical analysis; Number theory; Theory of equations
- Scientific career
- Fields: Mathematics; Astronomy; Mechanics
- Workplaces: École Normale; École Polytechnique
- Academic advisors: Leonhard Euler (epistolary correspondent); Giovanni Battista Beccaria
- Notable students: Joseph Fourier; Giovanni Plana; Siméon Poisson

Joseph-Louis Lagrange (Note: UK: /læˈɡrɒ̃ʒ/, US: /ləˈɡreɪndʒ, ləˈɡrɑːndʒ, ləˈɡrɒ̃ʒ/; French: [ʒozɛf lwi laɡʁɑ̃ʒ].) (born Giuseppe Luigi Lagrangia (Note: Italian: [dʒuˈzɛppe luˈiːdʒi laˈɡrandʒa].) or Giuseppe Ludovico De la Grange Tournier; (Note: Italian: [dʒuˈzɛppe ludoˈviːko de la ˈɡranʒ turˈnje], French: [də la ɡʁɑ̃ʒ tuʁnje].) 25 January 1736 – 10 April 1813), also reported as Giuseppe Luigi Lagrange or Lagrangia, was an Italian and naturalized French mathematician, physicist and astronomer. He made significant contributions to the fields of analysis, number theory, and both classical and celestial mechanics.

In 1766, on the recommendation of Leonhard Euler and d'Alembert, Lagrange succeeded Euler as the director of mathematics at the Prussian Academy of Sciences in Berlin, Prussia, where he stayed for over twenty years, producing many volumes of work and winning several prizes of the French Academy of Sciences. Lagrange's treatise on analytical mechanics (Mécanique analytique, 4. ed., 2 vols. Paris: Gauthier-Villars et fils, 1788–89), which was written in Berlin and first published in 1788, offered the most comprehensive treatment of classical mechanics since Isaac Newton and formed a basis for the development of mathematical physics in the nineteenth century.

In 1787, at age 51, he moved from Berlin to Paris and became a member of the French Academy of Sciences. He remained in France until the end of his life. He was instrumental in the decimalisation process in Revolutionary France, became the first professor of analysis at the École Polytechnique upon its opening in 1794, was a founding member of the Bureau des Longitudes, and became Senator in 1799.

== Scientific contribution ==
Lagrange was one of the creators of the calculus of variations, deriving the Euler–Lagrange equations for extrema of functionals. He extended the method to include possible constraints, arriving at the method of Lagrange multipliers. Lagrange invented the method of solving differential equations known as variation of parameters, applied differential calculus to the theory of probabilities and worked on solutions for algebraic equations. He proved that every natural number is a sum of four squares. His treatise Theorie des fonctions analytiques laid some of the foundations of group theory, anticipating Galois. In calculus, Lagrange developed a novel approach to interpolation and Taylor's theorem. He studied the three-body problem for the Earth, Sun and Moon (1764) and the movement of Jupiter's satellites (1766), and in 1772 found the special-case solutions to this problem that yield what are now known as Lagrangian points. Lagrange is best known for transforming Newtonian mechanics into a branch of analysis, Lagrangian mechanics. He presented the mechanical "principles" as simple results of the variational calculus.

== Biography ==
In appearance he was of medium height, and slightly formed, with pale blue eyes and a colourless complexion. In character he was nervous and timid, he detested controversy, and to avoid it willingly allowed others to take the credit for what he had himself done.

He always thought out the subject of his papers before he began to compose them, and usually wrote them straight off without a single erasure or correction.

W.W. Rouse Ball

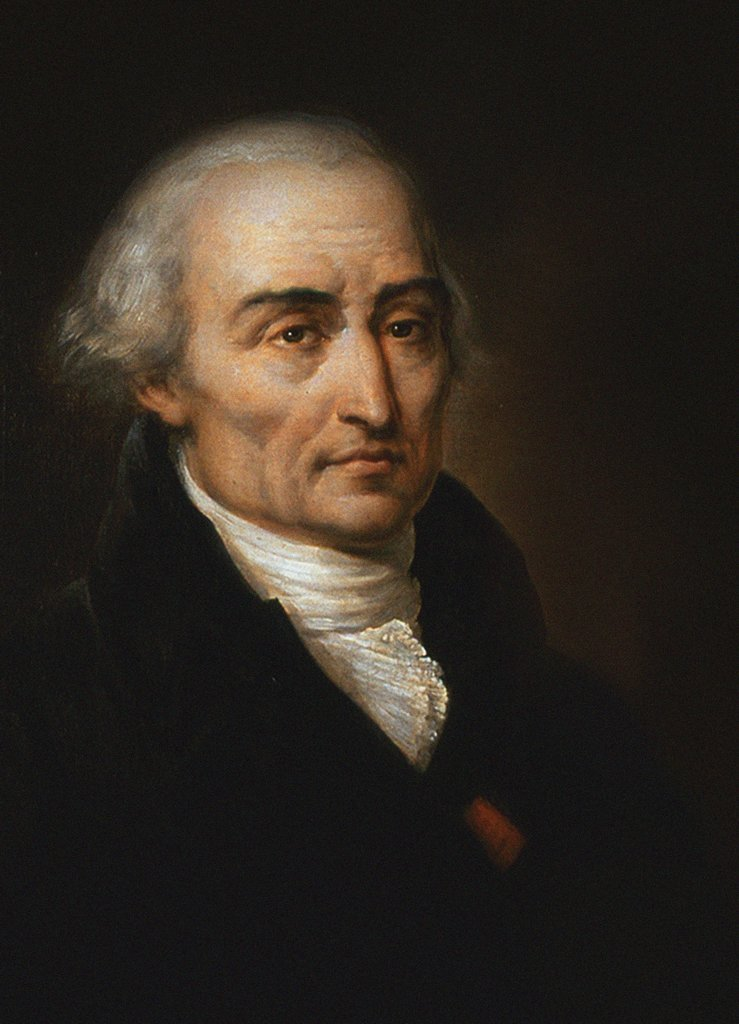
Portrait of Joseph-Louis Lagrange (18th-century)

=== Early years ===
Firstborn of eleven children as Giuseppe Lodovico Lagrangia, Lagrange was of Italian and French descent. His paternal great-grandfather was a French captain of cavalry, whose family originated from the French region of Tours. After serving under Louis XIV, he had entered the service of Charles Emmanuel II, Duke of Savoy, and married a Conti from the noble Roman family. Lagrange's father, Giuseppe Francesco Lodovico, was a doctor in Law at the University of Torino, while his mother was the only child of a rich doctor of Cambiano, in the countryside of Turin. He was raised as a Roman Catholic (but later on became an agnostic).

His father, who had charge of the King's military chest and was Treasurer of the Office of Public Works and Fortifications in Turin, should have maintained a good social position and wealth, but before his son grew up he had lost most of his property in speculations. A career as a lawyer was planned out for Lagrange by his father, and certainly Lagrange seems to have accepted this willingly. He studied at the University of Turin and his favourite subject was classical Latin. At first, he had no great enthusiasm for mathematics, finding Greek geometry rather dull.

It was not until he was seventeen that he showed any taste for mathematics – his interest in the subject being first excited by a paper by Edmond Halley from 1693 which he came across by accident. Alone and unaided he threw himself into mathematical studies; at the end of a year's incessant toil he was already an accomplished mathematician. Charles Emmanuel III appointed Lagrange to serve as the "Sostituto del Maestro di Matematica" (mathematics assistant professor) at the Royal Military Academy of the Theory and Practice of Artillery in 1755, where he taught courses in calculus and mechanics to support the Piedmontese army's early adoption of the ballistics theories of Benjamin Robins and Leonhard Euler. In that capacity, Lagrange was the first to teach calculus in an engineering school. According to Alessandro Papacino D'Antoni, the academy's military commander and famous artillery theorist, Lagrange unfortunately proved to be a problematic professor with his oblivious teaching style, abstract reasoning, and impatience with artillery and fortification-engineering applications. In this academy one of his students was François Daviet.

==== Variational calculus ====
Lagrange is one of the founders of the calculus of variations. Starting in 1754, he worked on the problem of the tautochrone, discovering a method of maximizing and minimizing functionals in a way similar to finding extrema of functions. Lagrange wrote several letters to Leonhard Euler between 1754 and 1756 describing his results. He outlined his "δ-algorithm", leading to the Euler–Lagrange equations of variational calculus and considerably simplifying Euler's earlier analysis. Lagrange also applied his ideas to problems of classical mechanics, generalising the results of Euler and Maupertuis.

Euler was very impressed with Lagrange's results. It has been stated that "with characteristic courtesy he withheld a paper he had previously written, which covered some of the same ground, in order that the young Italian might have time to complete his work, and claim the undisputed invention of the new calculus"; however, this chivalric view has been disputed. Lagrange published his method in two memoirs of the Turin Society in 1762 and 1773.

==== Miscellanea Taurinensia ====
In 1757, together with Giuseppe Angelo Saluzzo (a chemist who made his home available for the meetings) and the physicist Giovanni Francesco Cigna, Lagrange established a society, which was subsequently incorporated as the Turin Academy of Sciences. Most of his early writings are to be found in the five volumes of the Academy's transactions, usually known as the Miscellanea Taurinensia. Many of these are elaborate papers. The first volume contains a paper on the theory of the propagation of sound; in this he indicates a mistake made by Newton, obtains the general differential equation for the motion, and integrates it for motion in a straight line. This volume also contains the complete solution of the problem of a string vibrating transversely; in this paper, he points out a lack of generality in the solutions previously given by Brook Taylor, D'Alembert, and Euler, and arrives at the conclusion that the form of the curve at any time t is given by the equation $y = a \sin (mx) \sin (nt)\,$. The article concludes with a masterly discussion of echoes, beats, and compound sounds. Other articles in this volume are on recurring series, probabilities, and the calculus of variations.

The second volume contains a long paper embodying the results of several papers in the first volume on the theory and notation of the calculus of variations, and he illustrates its use by deducing the principle of least action, and by solutions of various problems in dynamics.

The third volume includes the solution of several dynamical problems by means of the calculus of variations; some papers on the integral calculus; a solution of a Fermat's problem: given an integer n which is not a perfect square, to find a number x such that nx^{2} + 1 is a perfect square; and the general differential equations of motion for three bodies moving under their mutual attractions.

The next work he produced was in 1764 on the libration of the Moon, and an explanation as to why the same face was always turned to the earth, a problem which he treated by the aid of virtual work. His solution is especially interesting as containing the germ of the idea of generalised equations of motion, equations which he first formally proved in 1780.

=== Berlin ===
Already by 1756, Euler and Maupertuis, seeing Lagrange's mathematical talent, tried to persuade Lagrange to come to Berlin, but he shyly refused the offer. In 1765, d'Alembert interceded on Lagrange's behalf with Frederick of Prussia and by letter, asked him to leave Turin for a considerably more prestigious position in Berlin. He again turned down the offer, responding that

It seems to me that Berlin would not be at all suitable for me while M.Euler is there.

In 1766, after Euler left Berlin for Saint Petersburg, Frederick himself wrote to Lagrange expressing the wish of "the greatest king in Europe" to have "the greatest mathematician in Europe" resident at his court. Lagrange was finally persuaded. He spent the next twenty years in Prussia, where he produced a long series of papers published in the Berlin and Turin transactions, and composed his monumental work, the Mécanique analytique. In 1767, he married his cousin Vittoria Conti.

Lagrange was a favourite of the king, who frequently lectured him on the advantages of perfect regularity of life. The lesson was accepted, and Lagrange studied his mind and body as though they were machines, and experimented to find the exact amount of work which he could do before exhaustion. Every night he set himself a definite task for the next day, and on completing any branch of a subject he wrote a short analysis to see what points in the demonstrations or the subject-matter were capable of improvement. He carefully planned his papers before writing them, usually without a single erasure or correction.

Nonetheless, during his years in Berlin, Lagrange's health was rather poor, and that of his wife Vittoria was even worse. She died in 1783 after years of illness and Lagrange was very depressed. In 1786, Frederick II died, and the climate of Berlin became difficult for Lagrange.

=== Paris ===
In 1786, following Frederick's death, Lagrange received similar invitations from states including Spain and Naples, and he accepted the offer of Louis XVI to move to Paris. In France he was received with every mark of distinction and special apartments in the Louvre were prepared for his reception, and he became a member of the French Academy of Sciences, which later became part of the Institut de France (1795). At the beginning of his residence in Paris, he was seized with an attack of melancholy, and even the printed copy of his Mécanique on which he had worked for a quarter of a century lay for more than two years unopened on his desk. Curiosity as to the results of the French Revolution first stirred him out of his lethargy, a curiosity which soon turned to alarm as the revolution developed.

It was about the same time, 1792, that the unaccountable sadness of his life and his timidity moved the compassion of 24-year-old Renée-Françoise-Adélaïde Le Monnier, daughter of his friend, the astronomer Pierre Charles Le Monnier. She insisted on marrying him and proved a devoted wife to whom he became warmly attached.

In September 1793, the Reign of Terror began. Under the intervention of Antoine Lavoisier, who himself was by then already thrown out of the academy along with many other scholars, Lagrange was specifically exempted by name in the decree of October 1793 that ordered all foreigners to leave France. On 4 May 1794, Lavoisier and 27 other tax farmers were arrested and sentenced to death and guillotined on the afternoon after the trial. Lagrange said on the death of Lavoisier:

It took only a moment to cause this head to fall and a hundred years will not suffice to produce its like.

Though Lagrange had been preparing to escape from France while there was yet time, he was never in any danger; different revolutionary governments (and at a later time, Napoleon) gave him honours and distinctions. This luckiness or safety may to some extent be due to his life attitude he expressed many years before: "I believe that, in general, one of the first principles of every wise man is to conform strictly to the laws of the country in which he is living, even when they are unreasonable". A striking testimony to the respect in which he was held was shown in 1796 when the French commissary in Italy was ordered to attend in the full state on Lagrange's father and tender the congratulations of the republic on the achievements of his son, who "had done honour to all mankind by his genius, and whom it was the special glory of Piedmont to have produced". It may be added that Napoleon, when he attained power, warmly encouraged scientific studies in France, and was a liberal benefactor of them. Appointed senator in 1799, he was the first signer of the Sénatus-consulte which in 1802 annexed his fatherland Piedmont to France. He acquired French citizenship in consequence. The French claimed he was a French mathematician, but the Italians continued to claim him as Italian.

==== Units of measurement ====
Lagrange was involved in the development of the metric system of measurement in the 1790s. He was offered the presidency of the Commission for the reform of weights and measures (la Commission des Poids et Mesures) when he was preparing to escape. After Lavoisier's death in 1794, it was largely Lagrange who influenced the choice of the metre and kilogram units with decimal subdivision, by the commission of 1799. Lagrange was also one of the founding members of the Bureau des Longitudes in 1795.

==== École Normale ====
In 1795, Lagrange was appointed to a mathematical chair at the newly established École Normale, which enjoyed only a short existence of four months. His lectures there were elementary; they contain nothing of any mathematical importance, though they do provide a brief historical insight into his reason for proposing undecimal or Base 11 as the base number for the reformed system of weights and measures. The lectures were published because the professors had to "pledge themselves to the representatives of the people and to each other neither to read nor to repeat from memory" ["Les professeurs aux Écoles Normales ont pris, avec les Représentants du Peuple, et entr'eux l'engagement de ne point lire ou débiter de mémoire des discours écrits"]. The discourses were ordered and taken down in shorthand to enable the deputies to see how the professors acquitted themselves. It was also thought the published lectures would interest a significant portion of the citizenry ["Quoique des feuilles sténographiques soient essentiellement destinées aux élèves de l'École Normale, on doit prévoir quיelles seront lues par une grande partie de la Nation"].

==== École Polytechnique ====
In 1794, Lagrange was appointed professor of the École Polytechnique; and his lectures there, described by mathematicians who had the good fortune to be able to attend them, were almost perfect both in form and matter. Beginning with the merest elements, he led his hearers on until, almost unknown to themselves, they were themselves extending the bounds of the subject: above all he impressed on his pupils the advantage of always using general methods expressed in a symmetrical notation.

However, Lagrange does not seem to have been a successful teacher. Fourier, who attended his lectures in 1795, wrote:

his voice is very feeble, at least in that he does not become heated; he has a very marked Italian accent and pronounces the s like z [...] The students, of whom the majority are incapable of appreciating him, give him little welcome, but the professeurs make amends for it.

==== Late years ====
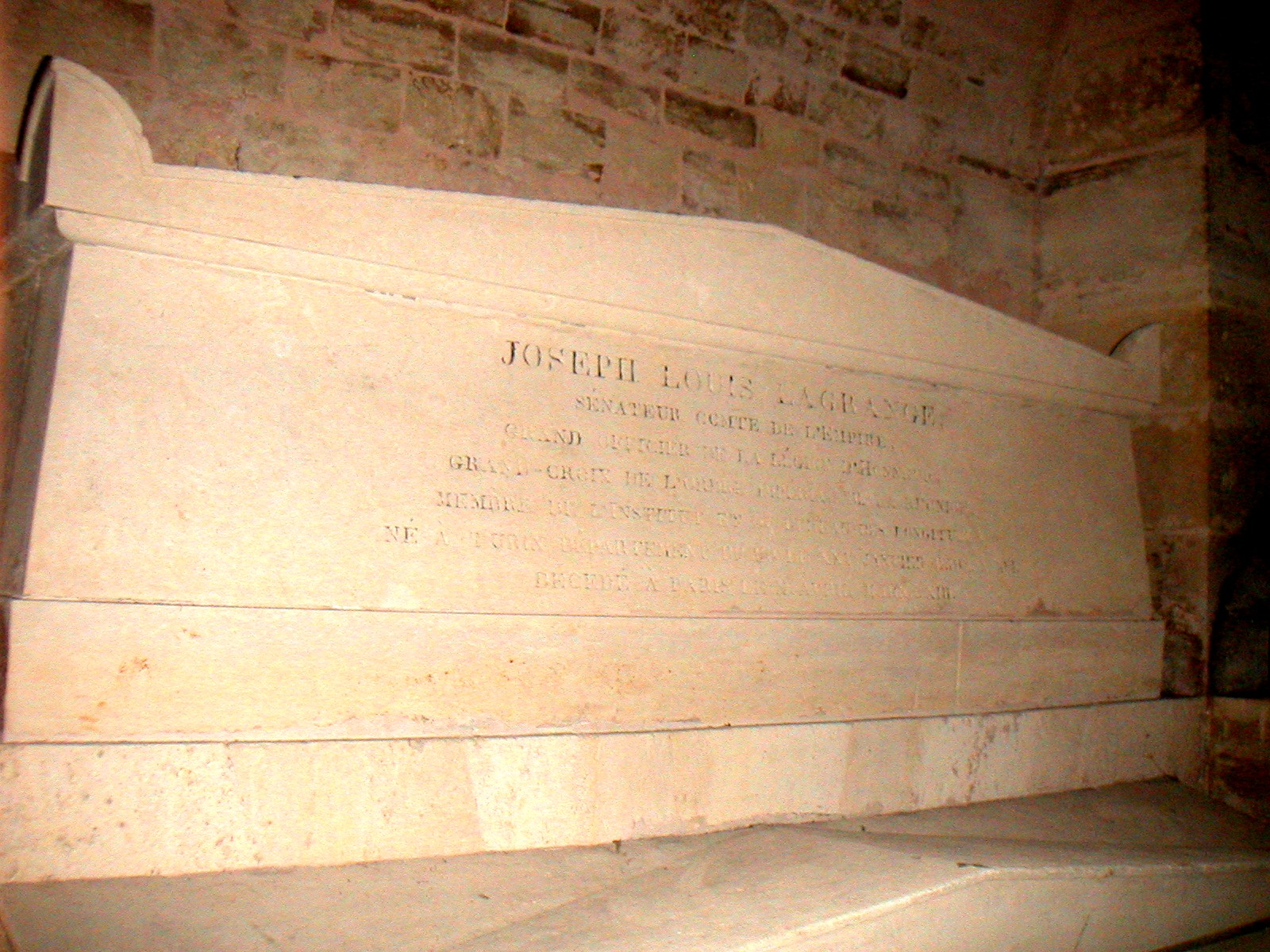
Lagrange's tomb in the crypt of the Panthéon

In 1810, Lagrange started a thorough revision of the Mécanique analytique, but he was able to complete only about two-thirds of it before his death in Paris in 1813, in 128 rue du Faubourg Saint-Honoré. Napoleon honoured him with the Grand Croix of the Ordre Impérial de la Réunion just two days before he died. He was buried that same year in the Panthéon in Paris. The inscription on his tomb reads in translation:

JOSEPH LOUIS LAGRANGE. Senator. Count of the Empire. Grand Officer of the Legion of Honour. Grand Cross of the Imperial Order of the Reunion. Member of the Institute and the Bureau of Longitude. Born in Turin on 25 January 1736. Died in Paris on 10 April 1813.

== Work in Berlin ==
Lagrange was extremely active scientifically during the twenty years he spent in Berlin. Not only did he produce his Mécanique analytique, but he contributed between one and two hundred papers to the Academy of Turin, the Berlin Academy, and the French Academy. Some of these are really treatises, and all without exception are of a high order of excellence. Except for a short time when he was ill he produced on average about one paper a month. Of these, note the following as amongst the most important.

First, his contributions to the fourth and fifth volumes, 1766–1773, of the Miscellanea Taurinensia; of which the most important was the one in 1771, in which he discussed how numerous astronomical observations should be combined so as to give the most probable result. And later, his contributions to the first two volumes, 1784–1785, of the transactions of the Turin Academy; to the first of which he contributed a paper on the pressure exerted by fluids in motion, and to the second an article on integration by infinite series, and the kind of problems for which it is suitable.

Most of the papers sent to Paris were on astronomical questions, and among these, including his paper on the Jovian system in 1766, his essay on the problem of three bodies in 1772, his work on the secular equation of the Moon in 1773, and his treatise on cometary perturbations in 1778. These were all written on subjects proposed by the Académie française, and in each case, the prize was awarded to him.

=== Lagrangian mechanics ===
Between 1772 and 1788, Lagrange re-formulated Classical/Newtonian mechanics to simplify formulas and ease calculations. These mechanics are called Lagrangian mechanics.

=== Algebra ===
The greater number of his papers during this time were, however, contributed to the Prussian Academy of Sciences. Several of them deal with questions in algebra.

- His discussion of representations of integers by quadratic forms (1769) and by more general algebraic forms (1770).
- His tract on the Theory of Elimination, 1770.
- Lagrange's theorem that the order of a subgroup H of a group G must divide the order of G.
- His papers of 1770 and 1771 on the general process for solving an algebraic equation of any degree via the Lagrange resolvents. This method fails to give a general formula for solutions of an equation of degree five and higher because the auxiliary equation involved has a higher degree than the original one. The significance of this method is that it exhibits the already known formulas for solving equations of second, third, and fourth degrees as manifestations of a single principle, and was foundational in Galois theory. The complete solution of a binomial equation (namely an equation of the form $ax^n$ ± $b=0$) is also treated in these papers.
- In 1773, Lagrange considered a functional determinant of order 3, a special case of a Jacobian. He also proved the expression for the volume of a tetrahedron with one of the vertices at the origin as the one-sixth of the absolute value of the determinant formed by the coordinates of the other three vertices.

=== Number theory ===
Several of his early papers also deal with questions of number theory.

- Lagrange (1766–1769) was the first European to prove that Pell's equation x^{2} − ny^{2} = 1 has a nontrivial solution in the integers for any non-square natural number n.
- He proved the theorem, stated by Bachet without justification, that every positive integer is the sum of four squares, 1770.
- He proved Wilson's theorem that (for any integer n > 1): n is a prime if and only if (n − 1)! + 1 is a multiple of n, 1771.
- His papers of 1773, 1775, and 1777 gave demonstrations of several results enunciated by Fermat, and not previously proved.
- His Recherches d'Arithmétique of 1775 developed a general theory of binary quadratic forms to handle the general problem of when an integer is representable by the form ax^{2} + by^{2} + cxy.
- He made contributions to the theory of continued fractions.

=== Other mathematical work ===
There are also numerous articles on various points of analytical geometry. In two of them, written rather later, in 1792 and 1793, he reduced the equations of the quadrics (or conicoids) to their canonical forms.

During the years from 1772 to 1785, he contributed a long series of papers which created the science of partial differential equations. A large part of these results was collected in the second edition of Euler's integral calculus which was published in 1794.

=== Astronomy ===
Lastly, there are numerous papers on problems in astronomy. Of these the most important are the following:

- Attempting to solve the general three-body problem, with the consequent discovery of the two constant-pattern solutions, collinear and equilateral, 1772. Those solutions were later seen to explain what are now known as the Lagrangian points.
- On the attraction of ellipsoids, 1773: this is founded on Maclaurin's work.
- On the secular equation of the Moon, 1773; also noticeable for the earliest introduction of the idea of the potential. The potential of a body at any point is the sum of the mass of every element of the body when divided by its distance from the point. Lagrange showed that if the potential of a body at an external point were known, the attraction in any direction could be at once found. The theory of the potential was elaborated in a paper sent to Berlin in 1777.
- On the motion of the nodes of a planet's orbit, 1774.
- On the stability of the planetary orbits, 1776.
- Two papers in which the method of determining the orbit of a comet from three observations is completely worked out, 1778 and 1783: this has not indeed proved practically available, but his system of calculating the perturbations by means of mechanical quadratures has formed the basis of most subsequent researches on the subject.
- His determination of the secular and periodic variations of the elements of the planets, 1781–1784: the upper limits assigned for these agree closely with those obtained later by Le Verrier, and Lagrange proceeded as far as the knowledge then possessed of the masses of the planets permitted.
- Three papers on the method of interpolation, 1783, 1792 and 1793: the part of finite differences dealing therewith is now in the same stage as that in which Lagrange left it.

=== Fundamental treatise ===
Over and above these various papers he composed his fundamental treatise, the Mécanique analytique.

In this book, he lays down the law of virtual work, and from that one fundamental principle, by the aid of the calculus of variations, deduces the whole of mechanics, both of solids and fluids.

The object of the book is to show that the subject is implicitly included in a single principle, and to give general formulae from which any particular result can be obtained. The method of generalised co-ordinates by which he obtained this result is perhaps the most brilliant result of his analysis. Instead of following the motion of each individual part of a material system, as D'Alembert and Euler had done, he showed that, if we determine its configuration by a sufficient number of variables x, called generalized coordinates, whose number is the same as that of the degrees of freedom possessed by the system, then the kinetic and potential energies of the system can be expressed in terms of those variables, and the differential equations of motion thence deduced by simple differentiation. For example, in dynamics of a rigid system he replaces the consideration of the particular problem by the general equation, which is now usually written in the form

$$\frac{d}{dt}
\frac{\partial T}{\partial \dot{x}}
- \frac{\partial T}{\partial x}
+ \frac{\partial V}{\partial x} = 0,$$

where T represents the kinetic energy and V represents the potential energy of the system. He then presented what we now know as the method of Lagrange multipliers—though this is not the first time that method was published—as a means to solve this equation. Amongst other minor theorems here given it may suffice to mention the proposition that the kinetic energy imparted by the given impulses to a material system under given constraints is a maximum, and the principle of least action. All the analysis is so elegant that Sir William Rowan Hamilton said the work could be described only as a scientific poem. Lagrange remarked that mechanics was really a branch of pure mathematics analogous to a geometry of four dimensions, namely, the time and the three coordinates of the point in space; and it is said that he prided himself that from the beginning to the end of the work there was not a single diagram. At first no printer could be found who would publish the book; but Legendre at last persuaded a Paris firm to undertake it, and it was issued under the supervision of Laplace, Cousin, Legendre (editor) and Condorcet in 1788.

== Work in France ==
=== Differential calculus and calculus of variations ===
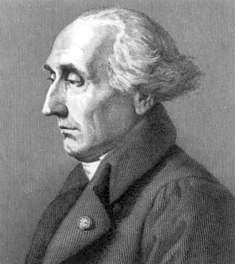
Joseph-Louis Lagrange

Lagrange's lectures on the differential calculus at École Polytechnique form the basis of his treatise Théorie des fonctions analytiques, which was published in 1797. This work is the extension of an idea contained in a paper he had sent to the Berlin papers in 1772, and its object is to substitute for the differential calculus a group of theorems based on the development of algebraic functions in series, relying in particular on the principle of the generality of algebra.

A somewhat similar method had been previously used by John Landen in the Residual Analysis, published in London in 1758. Lagrange believed that he could thus get rid of those difficulties, connected with the use of infinitely large and infinitely small quantities, to which philosophers objected in the usual treatment of the differential calculus. The book is divided into three parts: of these, the first treats of the general theory of functions, and gives an algebraic proof of Taylor's theorem, the validity of which is, however, open to question; the second deals with applications to geometry; and the third with applications to mechanics.

Another treatise on the same lines was his Leçons sur le calcul des fonctions, issued in 1804, with the second edition in 1806. It is in this book that Lagrange formulated his celebrated method of Lagrange multipliers, in the context of problems of variational calculus with integral constraints. These works devoted to differential calculus and calculus of variations may be considered as the starting point for the researches of Cauchy, Jacobi, and Weierstrass.

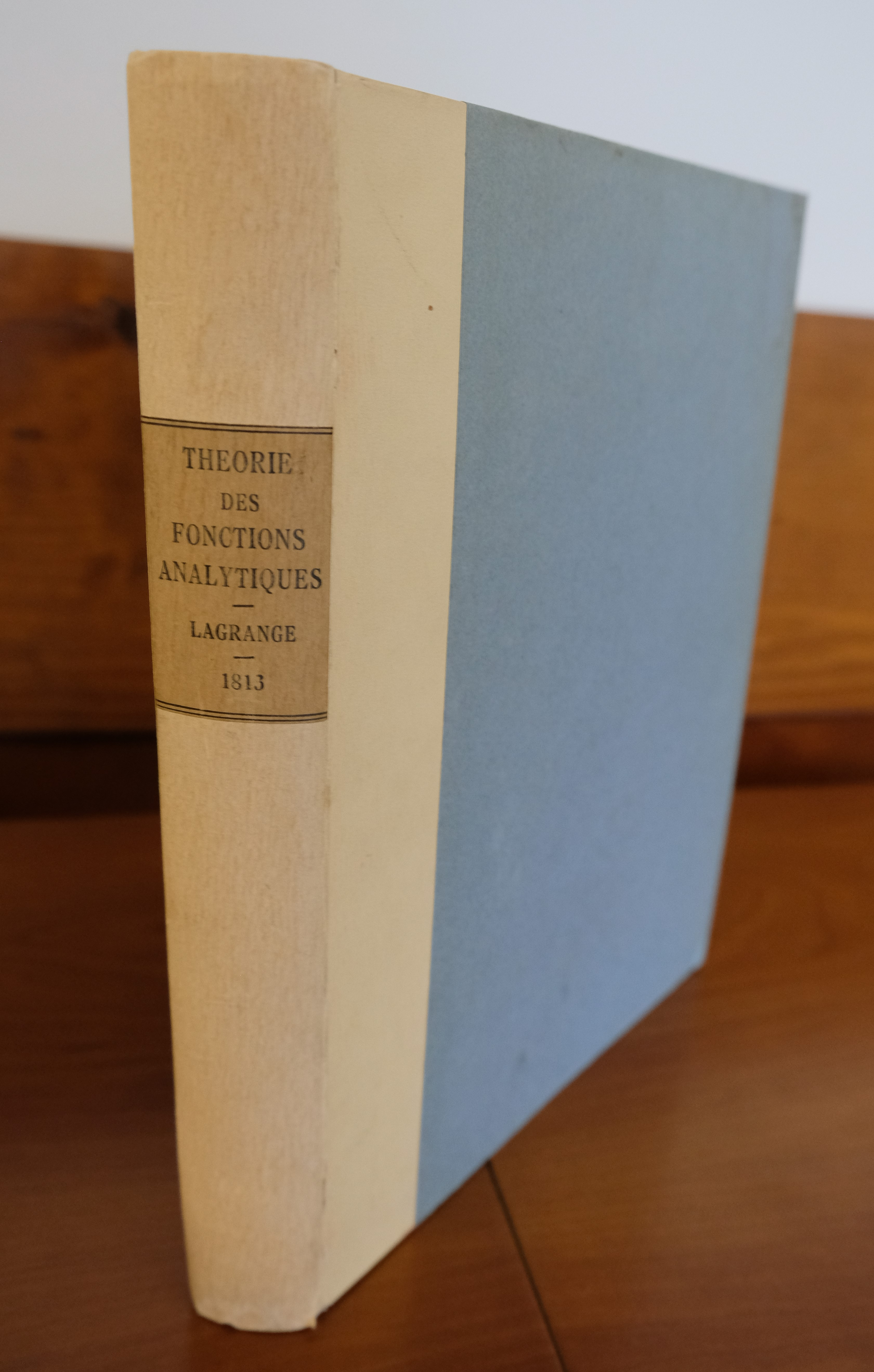
1813 copy of "Theorie des fonctions analytiques"

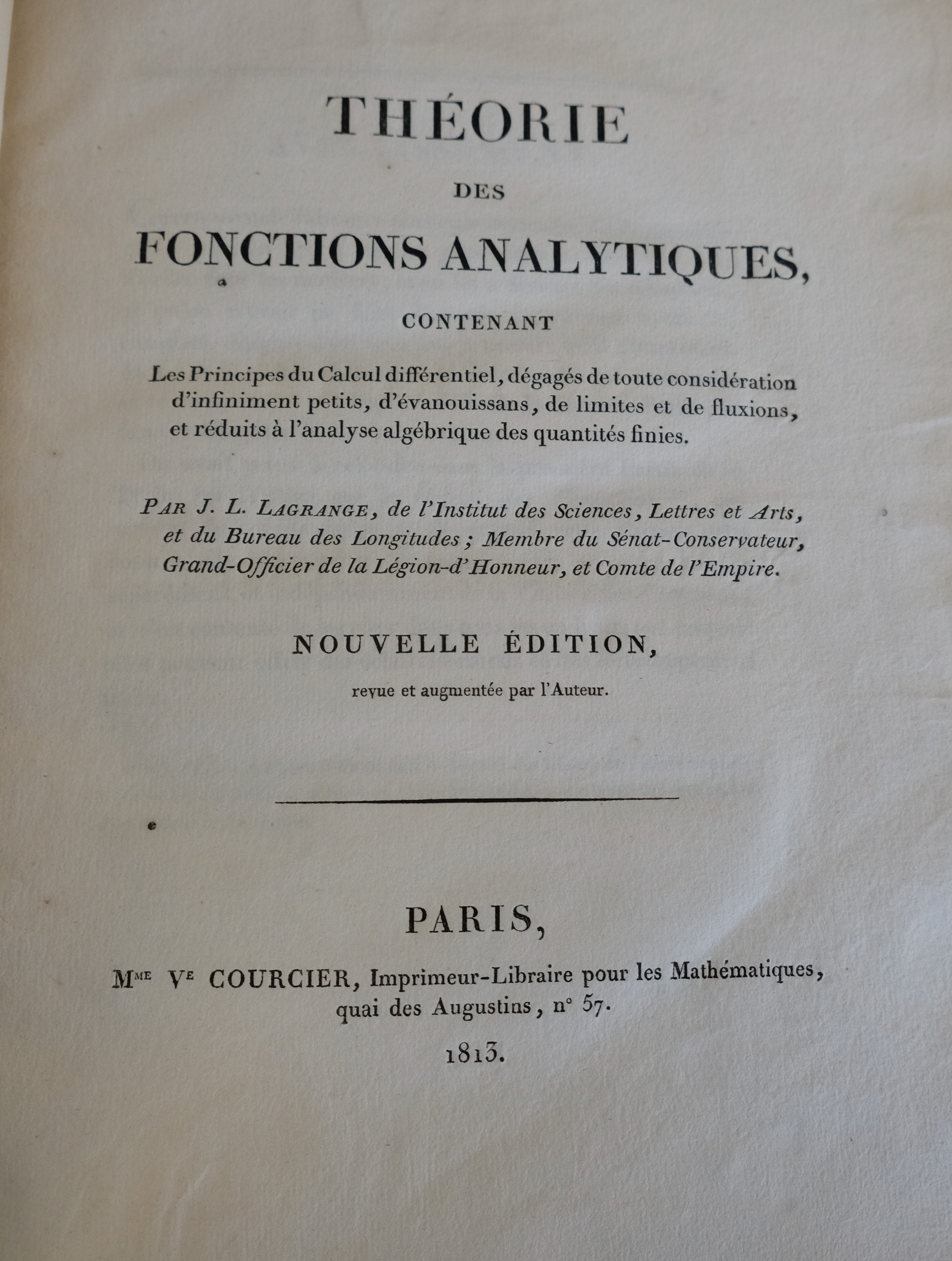
Title page to "Theorie des fonctions analytiques"

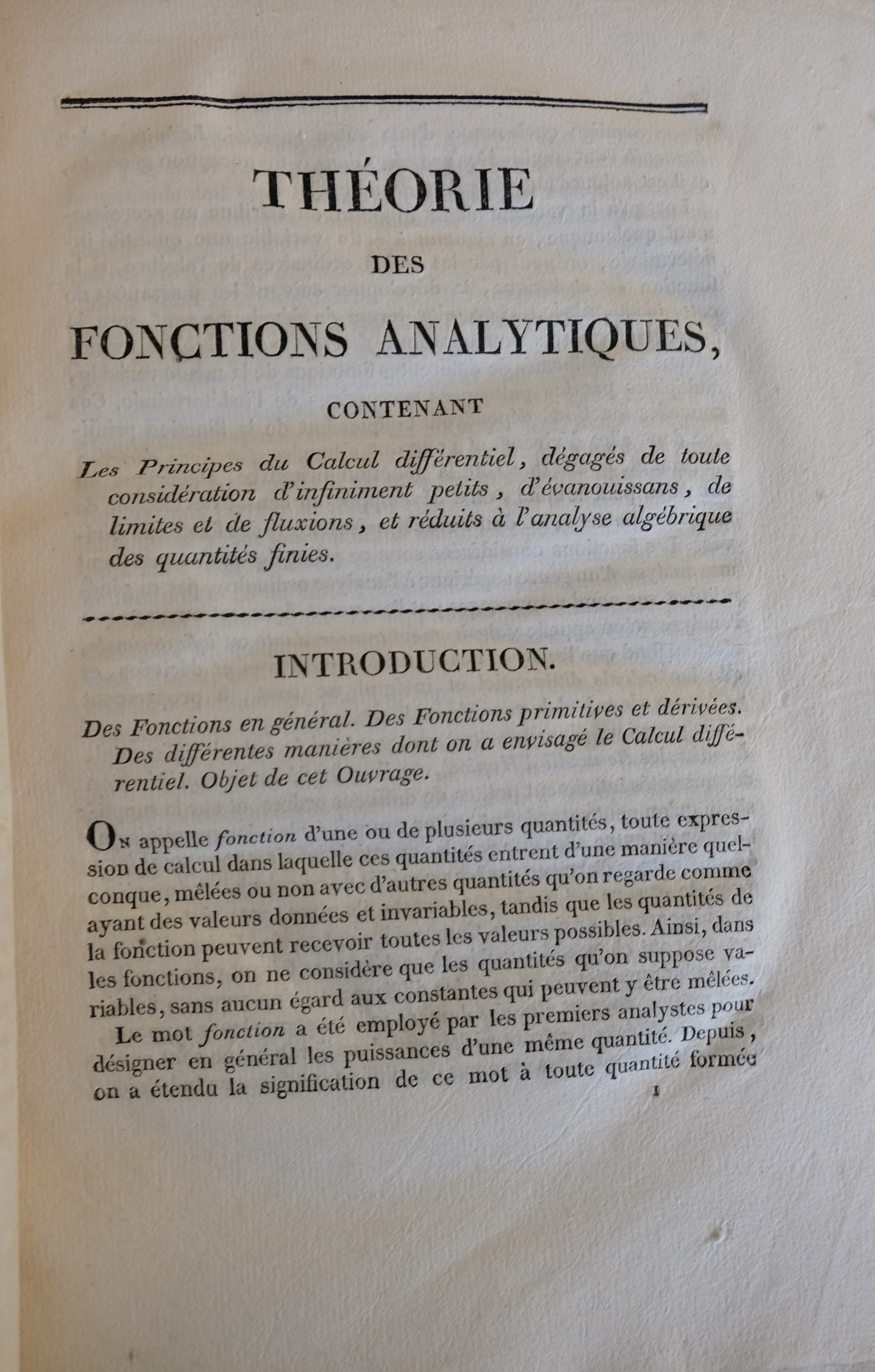
Introduction to "Theorie des fonctions analytiques"

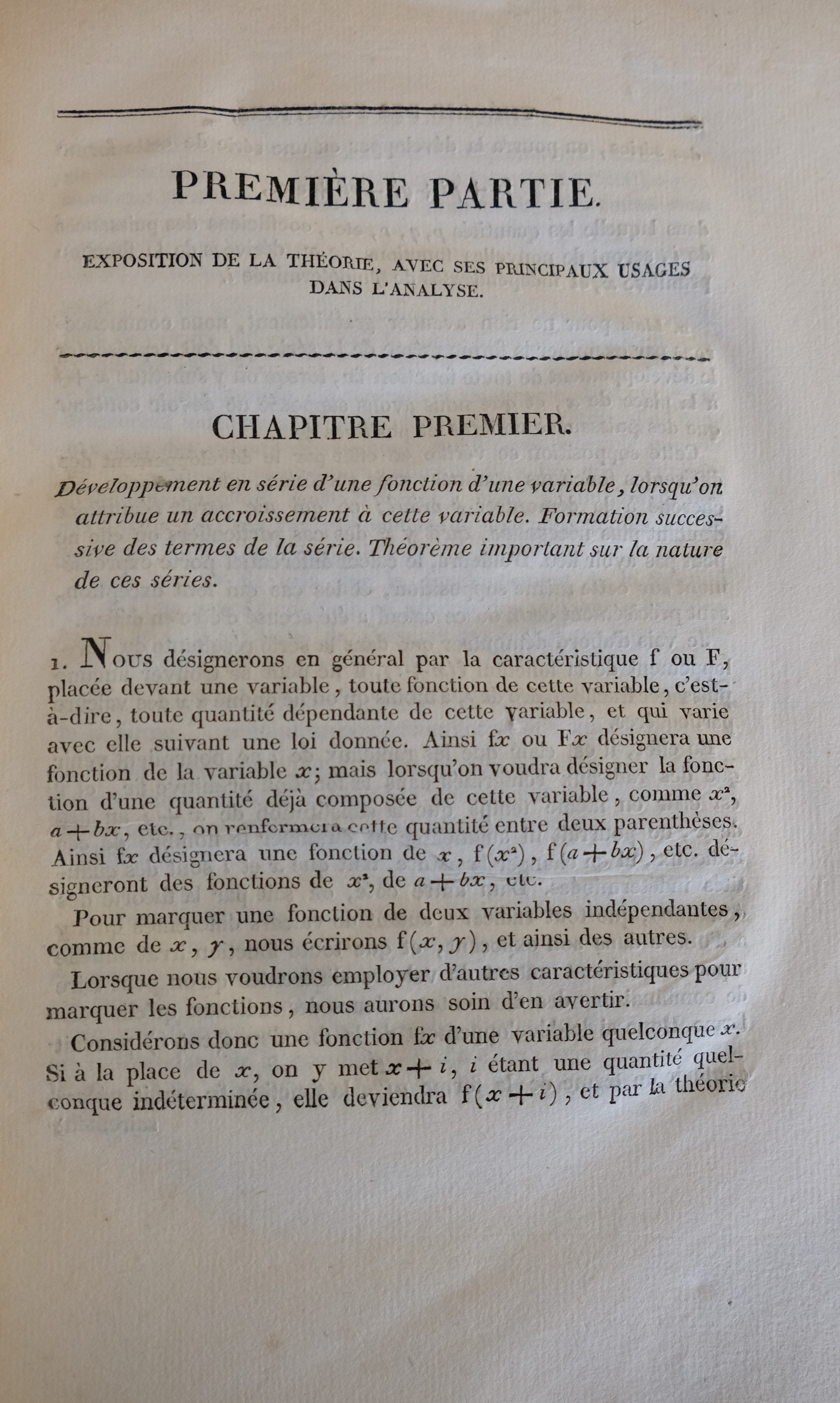
First page of "Theorie des fonctions analytiques"

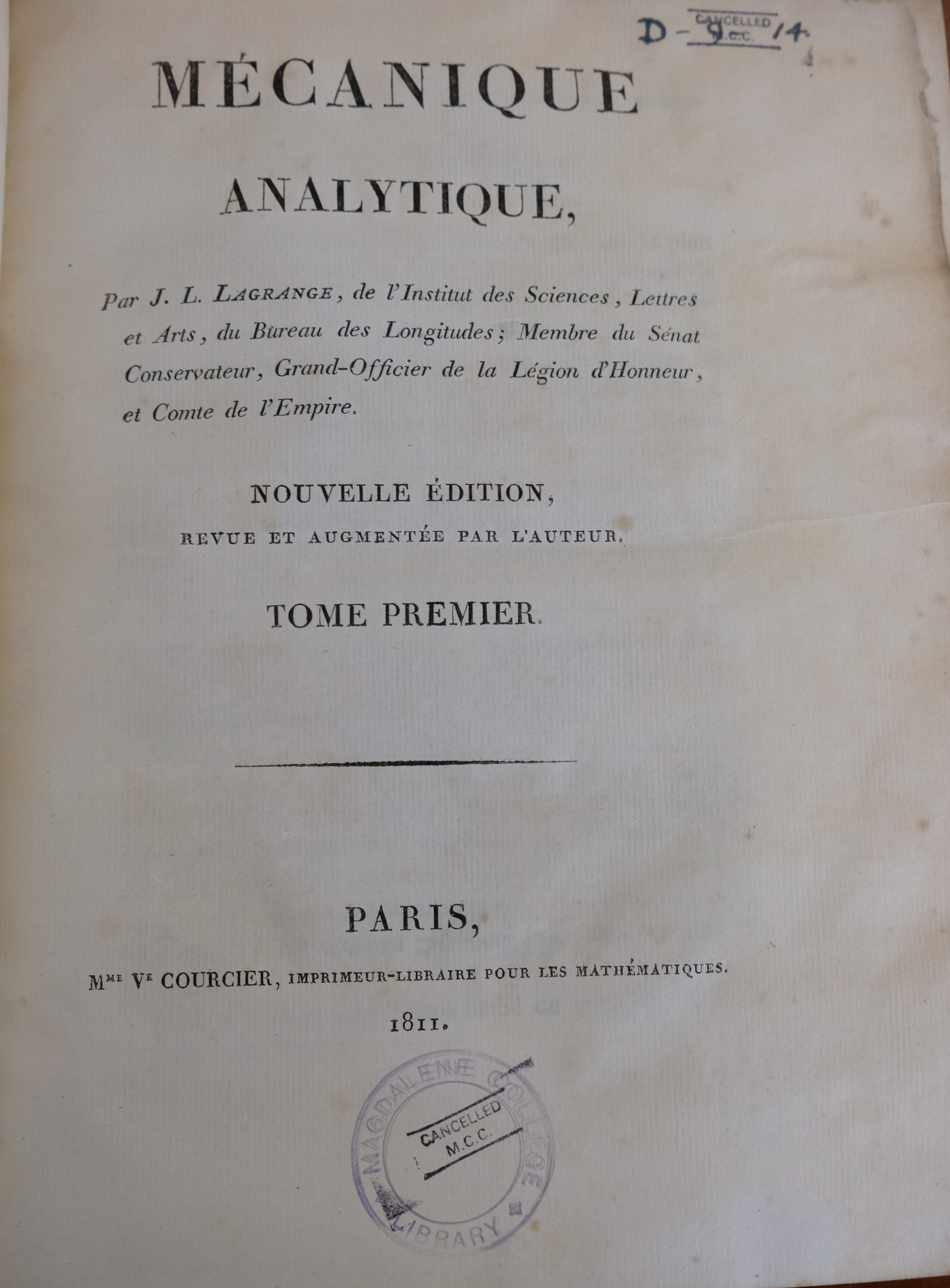
Title page of volume I of Lagrange's "Mécanique Analytique" (1811)

=== Infinitesimals ===
At a later period Lagrange fully embraced the use of infinitesimals in preference to founding the differential calculus on the study of algebraic forms; and in the preface to the second edition of the Mécanique Analytique, which was issued in 1811, he justifies the employment of infinitesimals, and concludes by saying that:

When we have grasped the spirit of the infinitesimal method, and have verified the exactness of its results either by the geometrical method of prime and ultimate ratios, or by the analytical method of derived functions, we may employ infinitely small quantities as a sure and valuable means of shortening and simplifying our proofs.

=== Number theory ===
His Résolution des équations numériques, published in 1798, was also the fruit of his lectures at École Polytechnique. There he gives the method of approximating the real roots of an equation by means of continued fractions, and enunciates several other theorems. In a note at the end, he shows how Fermat's little theorem, that is

$$a^{p-1}-1 \equiv 0\pmod p$$

where p is a prime and a is prime to p, may be applied to give the complete algebraic solution of any binomial equation. He also here explains how the equation whose roots are the squares of the differences of the roots of the original equation may be used so as to give considerable information as to the position and nature of those roots.

=== Celestial mechanics ===
A theory of the planetary motions had formed the subject of some of the most remarkable of Lagrange's Berlin papers. In 1806 the subject was reopened by Poisson, who, in a paper read before the French Academy, showed that Lagrange's formulae led to certain limits for the stability of the orbits. Lagrange, who was present, now discussed the whole subject afresh, and in a letter communicated to the academy in 1808 explained how, by the variation of arbitrary constants, the periodical and secular inequalities of any system of mutually interacting bodies could be determined.

== Prizes and distinctions ==
Euler proposed Lagrange for election to the Berlin Academy and he was elected on 2 September 1756. He was elected a Fellow of the Royal Society of Edinburgh in 1790, a Fellow of the Royal Society and a foreign member of the Royal Swedish Academy of Sciences in 1806. In 1808, Napoleon made Lagrange a Grand Officer of the Legion of Honour and a Count of the Empire. He was awarded the Grand Croix of the Ordre Impérial de la Réunion in 1813, a week before his death in Paris, and was buried in the Panthéon, a mausoleum dedicated to the most honoured French people.

Lagrange was awarded the 1764 prize of the French Academy of Sciences for his memoir on the libration of the Moon. In 1766 the academy proposed a problem of the motion of the satellites of Jupiter, and the prize again was awarded to Lagrange. He also shared or won the prizes of 1772, 1774, and 1778.

Lagrange is one of the 72 prominent French scientists who were commemorated on plaques at the first stage of the Eiffel Tower when it first opened. Rue Lagrange in the 5th Arrondissement in Paris is named after him. In Turin, the street where the house of his birth still stands is named via Lagrange. The lunar crater Lagrange and the asteroid 1006 Lagrangea also bear his name.

== See also ==
- List of things named after Joseph-Louis Lagrange
- Four-dimensional space
- Gauss's law
- History of the metre
- Lagrange's role in measurement reform
- Seconds pendulum
