= Coadjoint representation =

In mathematics, the coadjoint representation $K$ of a Lie group $G$ is the dual of the adjoint representation. If $\mathfrak{g}$ denotes the Lie algebra of $G$, the corresponding action of $G$ on $\mathfrak{g}^*$, the dual space to $\mathfrak{g}$, is called the coadjoint action. A geometrical interpretation is as the action by left-translation on the space of right-invariant 1-forms on $G$.

The importance of the coadjoint representation was emphasised by work of Alexandre Kirillov, who showed that for nilpotent Lie groups $G$ a basic role in their representation theory is played by coadjoint orbits. In the Kirillov method of orbits, representations of $G$ are constructed geometrically starting from the coadjoint orbits. In some sense those play a substitute role for the conjugacy classes of $G$, which again may be complicated, while the orbits are relatively tractable.

== Formal definition ==
Let $G$ be a Lie group and $\mathfrak{g}$ be its Lie algebra. Let $\mathrm{Ad} : G \rightarrow \mathrm{Aut}(\mathfrak{g})$ denote the adjoint representation of $G$. Then the coadjoint representation $\mathrm{Ad}^*: G \rightarrow \mathrm{GL}(\mathfrak{g}^*)$ is defined by

$\langle \mathrm{Ad}^*_g \, \mu, Y \rangle = \langle \mu, \mathrm{Ad}^{-1}_{g} Y \rangle = \langle \mu, \mathrm{Ad}_{g^{-1}} Y \rangle$ for $g \in G, Y \in \mathfrak{g}, \mu \in \mathfrak{g}^*,$

where $\langle \mu, Y \rangle$ denotes the value of the linear functional $\mu$ on the vector $Y$.

Let $\mathrm{ad}^*$ denote the representation of the Lie algebra $\mathfrak{g}$ on $\mathfrak{g}^*$ induced by the coadjoint representation of the Lie group $G$. Then the infinitesimal version of the defining equation for $\mathrm{Ad}^*$ reads:

$\langle \mathrm{ad}^*_X \mu, Y \rangle = \langle \mu, - \mathrm{ad}_X Y \rangle = - \langle \mu, [X, Y] \rangle$ for $X,Y \in \mathfrak{g}, \mu \in \mathfrak{g}^*$

where $\mathrm{ad}$ is the adjoint representation of the Lie algebra $\mathfrak{g}$.

== Coadjoint orbit ==
A coadjoint orbit $\mathcal{O}_\mu$ for $\mu$ in the dual space $\mathfrak{g}^*$ of $\mathfrak{g}$ may be defined either extrinsically, as the actual orbit $\mathrm{Ad}^*_G \mu$ inside $\mathfrak{g}^*$, or intrinsically as the homogeneous space $G/G_\mu$ where $G_\mu$ is the stabilizer of $\mu$ with respect to the coadjoint action; this distinction is worth making since the embedding of the orbit may be complicated.

The coadjoint orbits are submanifolds of $\mathfrak{g}^*$ and carry a natural symplectic structure. On each orbit $\mathcal{O}_\mu$, there is a closed non-degenerate $G$-invariant 2-form $\omega \in \Omega^2(\mathcal{O}_\mu)$ inherited from $\mathfrak{g}$ in the following manner:

$$\omega_\nu(\mathrm{ad}^*_X \nu, \mathrm{ad}^*_Y \nu) := \langle \nu, [X, Y] \rangle , \nu \in \mathcal{O}_\mu, X, Y \in \mathfrak{g}$$.

The well-definedness, non-degeneracy, and $G$-invariance of $\omega$ follow from the following facts:

(i) The tangent space $\mathrm{T}_\nu \mathcal{O}_\mu = \{ -\mathrm{ad}^*_X \nu : X \in \mathfrak{g}\}$ may be identified with $\mathfrak{g}/\mathfrak{g}_\nu$, where $\mathfrak{g}_\nu$ is the Lie algebra of $G_\nu$.

(ii) The kernel of the map $X \mapsto \langle \nu, [X, \cdot] \rangle$ is exactly $\mathfrak{g}_\nu$.

(iii) The bilinear form $\langle \nu, [\cdot, \cdot] \rangle$ on $\mathfrak{g}$ is invariant under $G_\nu$.

$\omega$ is also closed. The canonical 2-form $\omega$ is sometimes referred to as the Kirillov-Kostant-Souriau symplectic form or KKS form on the coadjoint orbit.

=== Properties of coadjoint orbits ===
The coadjoint action on a coadjoint orbit $(\mathcal{O}_\mu, \omega)$ is a Hamiltonian $G$-action with momentum map given by the inclusion $\mathcal{O}_\mu \hookrightarrow \mathfrak{g}^*$.

== See also ==
- Borel–Bott–Weil theorem, for $G$ a compact group
- Kirillov character formula
- Kirillov orbit theory
