= Alexandre Kirillov =

Russian mathematician

Alexander Kirillov
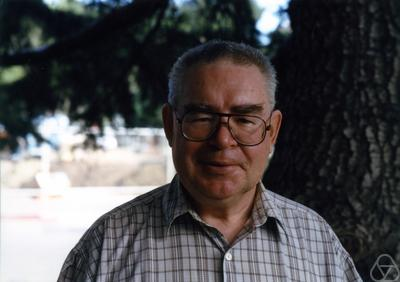
- Born: May 9, 1936 (age 90); Moscow, Soviet Union
- Education: Moscow State University
- Known for: Kirillov character formula Kirillov orbit theory Kirillov model
- Children: Julia Kirillova, Alexander Kirillov Jr.
- Scientific career
- Fields: Mathematics
- Workplaces: University of Pennsylvania; Moscow State University
- Thesis: Unitary representations of nilpotent Lie groups (1962)
- Doctoral advisor: Israel Gelfand
- Doctoral students: Alexei Borodin; Victor Ginzburg; David Kazhdan; Alexander Molev; Andrei Okounkov; Andrei Zelevinsky

Alexandre Aleksandrovich Kirilloff (Russian: Алекса́ндр Алекса́ндрович Кири́ллов, born 1936) is a Soviet and Russian mathematician, known for his works in the fields of representation theory, topological groups and Lie groups. In particular he introduced the orbit method into representation theory. He is an emeritus professor at the University of Pennsylvania.

== Career ==
Kirillov studied at Moscow State University where he was a student of Israel Gelfand. His Ph.D. (kandidat) dissertation Unitary representations of nilpotent Lie groups was published in 1962. He was awarded the degree of Doctor of Science. At the time he was the youngest Doctor of Science in the Soviet Union. He worked at the Moscow State University until 1994 when he became the Francis J. Carey Professor of Mathematics at the University of Pennsylvania.

During his school years, Kirillov was a winner of many mathematics competitions, and he is still an active organizer of Russian mathematical contests. Kirillov is an author of many popular school-oriented books and articles.

In 2012 he became a fellow of the American Mathematical Society.

Kirillov's son, Alexander Kirillov, Jr., is also a mathematician, working on the representation theory of Lie groups at the State University of New York at Stony Brook.

== Publications ==
- Kirillov, A. A. (1976) [1972], Elements of the theory of representations, Grundlehren der Mathematischen Wissenschaften, vol. 220, Berlin, New York: Springer-Verlag, ISBN 978-0-387-07476-4, MR 0412321
- ——— (1999). "Merits and demerits of the orbit method". Bull. Amer. Math. Soc. (N.S.). 36 (4): 433–483. doi:10.1090/s0273-0979-99-00849-6. MR 1701415.
- ——— (2004), Lectures on the orbit method, Graduate Studies in Mathematics, vol. 64, Providence, RI: American Mathematical Society, ISBN 0-8218-3530-0.
