= Symplectic manifold =

Type of manifold in differential geometry

In differential geometry, a symplectic manifold is a smooth manifold, $M$, equipped with a closed nondegenerate differential 2-form, $\omega$, called the symplectic form. The study of symplectic manifolds is called symplectic geometry or symplectic topology. Symplectic manifolds arise naturally in abstract formulations of classical mechanics and analytical mechanics as the cotangent bundles of manifolds. For example, in the Hamiltonian formulation of classical mechanics, which provides one of the major motivations for the field, the set of all possible configurations of a system is modeled as a manifold, and this manifold's cotangent bundle describes the phase space of the system.

== Motivation ==
Symplectic manifolds arise from classical mechanics; in particular, they are a generalization of the phase space of a closed system. In the same way the Hamilton equations allow one to derive the time evolution of a system from a set of differential equations, the symplectic form should allow one to obtain a vector field describing the flow of the system from the differential $dH$ of a Hamiltonian function $H$. So we require a linear map $TM \rightarrow T^*M$ from the tangent manifold $TM$ to the cotangent manifold $T^* M$, or equivalently, an element of $T^*M \otimes T^*M$. Letting $\omega$ denote a section of $T^*M \otimes T^* M$, the requirement that $\omega$ be non-degenerate ensures that for every differential $dH$ there is a unique corresponding vector field $V_H$ such that $dH = \omega (V_H, \cdot)$. Since one desires the Hamiltonian to be constant along flow lines, one should have $\omega(V_H, V_H) = dH(V_H) = 0$, which implies that $\omega$ is alternating and hence a 2-form. Finally, one makes the requirement that $\omega$ should not change under flow lines, i.e. that the Lie derivative of $\omega$ along $V_H$ vanishes. Applying Cartan's formula, this amounts to (here $\iota_X$ is the interior product):

$$\mathcal{L}_{V_H}(\omega) = 0\;\Leftrightarrow\;\mathrm d (\iota_{V_H} \omega) + \iota_{V_H} \mathrm d\omega= \mathrm d (\mathrm d\,H) + \mathrm d\omega(V_H) = \mathrm d\omega(V_H)=0$$

so that, on repeating this argument for different smooth functions $H$ such that the corresponding $V_H$ span the tangent space at each point the argument is applied at, we see that the requirement for the vanishing Lie derivative along flows of $V_H$ corresponding to arbitrary smooth $H$ is equivalent to the requirement that ω should be closed.

== Definition ==
Let $M$ be a smooth manifold. A symplectic form on $M$ is a closed non-degenerate differential 2-form $\omega$. Here, non-degenerate means that for every point $p \in M$, the skew-symmetric pairing on the tangent space $T_p M$ defined by $\omega$ is non-degenerate. That is to say, if there exists an $X \in T_p M$ such that $\omega( X, Y ) = 0$ for all $Y \in T_p M$, then $X = 0$. The closed condition means that the exterior derivative of $\omega$ vanishes.

A symplectic manifold is a pair $(M, \omega)$ where $M$ is a smooth manifold and $\omega$ is a symplectic form. Assigning a symplectic form to $M$ is referred to as giving $M$ a symplectic structure. Since in odd dimensions, skew-symmetric matrices are always singular, nondegeneracy implies that $\dim M$ is even.

By nondegeneracy, $\omega$ can be used to define a pair of musical isomorphisms $\omega^\flat: T M \rightarrow T^* M, \omega^\sharp : T^* M \rightarrow T M$, such that $\omega(X, Y) = \omega^\flat(X) (Y)$ for any two vector fields $X, Y$, and $\omega^\sharp \circ\omega^\flat = \operatorname{Id}$.

A symplectic manifold $(M, \omega)$ is exact iff the symplectic form $\omega$ is exact, i.e. equal to $\omega = -d\theta$ for some 1-form $\theta$. The symplectic form on any compact symplectic manifold without boundary is inexact, by Stokes' theorem.

By Darboux's theorem, around any point $p$ there exists a local coordinate system, in which $\omega = \Sigma_i dp_i \wedge dq^i$, where d denotes the exterior derivative and ∧ denotes the exterior product. This form is called the Poincaré two-form or the canonical two-form. Thus, we can locally think of M as being the cotangent bundle $T^*\R^n$ and generated by the corresponding tautological 1-form $\theta = \Sigma_i p_i dq^i, \;\omega = d\theta$.

A (local) Liouville form is any (locally defined) $\lambda$ such that $\omega = d\lambda$. A vector field $X$ is (locally) Liouville iff $\mathcal L_X \omega = \omega$. By Cartan's magic formula, this is equivalent to $d(\omega(X, \cdot)) = \omega$. A Liouville vector field can thus be interpreted as a way to recover a (local) Liouville form. By Darboux's theorem, around any point there exists a local Liouville form, though it might not exist globally.

On a symplectic manifold, every smooth function $H:M\to\mathbb R$ determines a Hamiltonian vector field $X_H$ by $\iota_{X_H}\omega=dH$, up to sign convention. The integral curves of $X_H$ are the Hamiltonian flow of $H$. In classical mechanics, $H$ is the energy function and the symplectic form encodes Hamilton's equations. The set of all Hamiltonian vector fields make up a Lie algebra, and is written as $(\operatorname{Ham}(M), [\cdot, \cdot])$ where $[\cdot, \cdot]$ is the Lie bracket.

Given any two smooth functions $f, g : M \to \R$, their Poisson bracket is defined by $\{f,g\} = \omega (X_g,X_f)$. This makes any symplectic manifold into a Poisson manifold. The Poisson bivector is a bivector field $\pi$ defined by $\{ f,g \} = \pi(df \wedge dg)$, or equivalently, by $\pi := \omega^{-1}$. The Poisson bracket and Lie bracket are related by $X_{\{f,g\}} = [X_f,X_g]$.

== Basic properties ==
If $(M,\omega)$ is a symplectic manifold of dimension $2n$, then $\omega^n$ is a nowhere-vanishing top-degree form. Thus every symplectic manifold is orientable and has a natural volume form, called the symplectic volume form.

Unlike a Riemannian metric, a symplectic form does not define lengths or angles. By Darboux's theorem, all symplectic manifolds of the same dimension are locally symplectomorphic. Consequently, symplectic geometry has no local curvature invariant analogous to the Riemannian curvature tensor; many of its main questions are global.

== Submanifolds ==
There are several natural geometric notions of submanifold of a symplectic manifold $(M, \omega)$. Let $N \subset M$ be a submanifold. It is

- symplectic iff $\omega|_N$ is a symplectic form on $N$;
- isotropic iff $\omega|_N = 0$, equivalently, iff $T_p N \subset T_p N^\perp$ for any $p \in N$, where $T_p N^\perp$ is the annihilator of $\omega(T_pN)$ in $T_pM$;
- coisotropic iff $T_p N^\perp\subset T_p N$ for any $p \in N$;
- Lagrangian iff it is both isotropic and coisotropic, i.e. $\omega|_N=0$ and $\text{dim }N=\tfrac{1}{2}\dim M$. By the nondegeneracy of $\omega$, Lagrangian submanifolds are the maximal isotropic submanifolds and minimal coisotropic submanifolds.

== Lagrangian submanifolds ==
Lagrangian submanifolds are the most important submanifolds. Weinstein proposed the "symplectic creed": Everything is a Lagrangian submanifold. By that, he means that everything in symplectic geometry is most naturally expressed in terms of Lagrangian submanifolds.

A Lagrangian fibration of a symplectic manifold M is a fibration where all of the fibers are Lagrangian submanifolds.

Given a submanifold $N \subset M$ of codimension 1, the characteristic line distribution on it is the duals to its tangent spaces: $T_p N^\omega$. If there also exists a Liouville vector field $X$ in a neighborhood of it that is transverse to it. In this case, let $\alpha := \omega(X, \cdot)|_N$, then $(N, \alpha)$ is a contact manifold, and we say it is a contact type submanifold. In this case, the Reeb vector field is tangent to the characteristic line distribution.

An n-submanifold is locally specified by a smooth function $u: \R^n \to M$. It is a Lagrangian submanifold if $\omega(\partial_i , \partial_j) = 0$ for all $i, j \in 1:n$. If locally there is a canonical coordinate system $(q, p)$, then the condition is equivalent to
$$[ u, v ]_{p,q} = \sum_{i=1}^n \left(\frac{\partial q_i}{\partial u} \frac{\partial p_i}{\partial v} - \frac{\partial p_i}{\partial u} \frac{\partial q_i}{\partial v} \right) = 0, \quad \forall i, j \in 1:n$$
where $[\cdot, \cdot]_{p, q}$ is the Lagrange bracket in this coordinate system.

The graph of a closed 1-form on $M$ is a Lagrangian submanifold of $T^*M$. In particular, the graph of $df$ is Lagrangian. Conversely, if a Lagrangian submanifold $L\subset T^*M$ projects diffeomorphically to $M$, then it is the graph of a closed 1-form. It is globally the graph of $df$ only when that closed 1-form is exact.

=== Lagrangian mapping ===

Let L be a Lagrangian submanifold of a symplectic manifold (K,ω) given by an immersion i : L ↪ K (i is called a Lagrangian immersion). Let π : K ↠ B give a Lagrangian fibration of K. The composite (π ∘ i) : L ↪ K ↠ B is a Lagrangian mapping. The critical value set of π ∘ i is called a caustic.

Two Lagrangian maps (π_{1} ∘ i_{1}) : L_{1} ↪ K_{1} ↠ B_{1} and (π_{2} ∘ i_{2}) : L_{2} ↪ K_{2} ↠ B_{2} are called Lagrangian equivalent if there exist diffeomorphisms σ, τ and ν such that both sides of the diagram given on the right commute, and τ preserves the symplectic form. Symbolically:

$$\tau \circ  i_1 = i_2 \circ \sigma, \ \nu \circ \pi_1 = \pi_2 \circ \tau, \ \tau^*\omega_2 = \omega_1 \, ,$$

where τ^{∗}ω_{2} denotes the pull back of ω_{2} by τ.

== Symmetries ==
A map $f: (M, \omega) \to (M', \omega')$ between symplectic manifolds is a symplectomorphism when it preserves the symplectic structure, i.e. the pullback is the same $f^* \omega' = \omega$. The most important symplectomorphisms are symplectic flows, i.e. ones generated by integrating a vector field on $(M, \omega)$.

Given a vector field $X$ on $(M, \omega)$, it generates a symplectic flow iff $\mathcal L_X \omega = 0$. Such vector fields are called symplectic. Any Hamiltonian vector field is symplectic, and conversely, any symplectic vector field is locally Hamiltonian.

A property that is preserved under all symplectomorphisms is a symplectic invariant. In the spirit of Erlangen program, symplectic geometry is the study of symplectic invariants.

== Examples ==
=== The standard symplectic structure ===
Let $\{v_1, \ldots, v_{2n}\}$ be a basis for $\R^{2n}.$ We define our symplectic form $\omega$ on this basis as follows:

$$\omega(v_i, v_j) = \begin{cases} 1 & j-i =n \text{ with } 1 \leqslant i \leqslant n \\ -1 & i-j =n \text{ with } 1 \leqslant j \leqslant n \\ 0 & \text{otherwise} \end{cases}$$

In this case the symplectic form reduces to a simple bilinear form. If $I_n$ denotes the $n\times n$ identity matrix then the matrix, $\Omega$, of this bilinear form is given by the $2n\times 2n$ block matrix:

$$\Omega = \begin{pmatrix} 0 & I_n  \\ -I_n & 0 \end{pmatrix}.$$

That is,

$$\omega =\mathrm{d}x_1\wedge \mathrm{d}y_1 + \dotsb + \mathrm{d}x_n\wedge \mathrm{d}y_n.$$

It has a fibration by Lagrangian submanifolds with fixed value of $y$, i.e. $\{\R^n \times \{y\} : y \in \R^n\}$.

A Liouville form for this is $\lambda=\frac{1}{2} \sum_i\left(x_i d y_i-y_i d x_i\right)$ and $\omega=d \lambda$, the Liouville vector field is
$$Y=\frac{1}{2} \sum_i\left(x_i \partial_{x_i}+y_i \partial_{y_i}\right),$$
the radial field. Another Liouville form is $\Sigma_i x_i dy_i$, with Liouville vector field $Y=\sum_i x_i \partial_{x_i}$.

=== Surfaces ===
Every oriented smooth surface with an area form is a symplectic manifold. In dimension two, the closedness condition is automatic for any 2-form.

=== Cotangent bundles ===
If $Q$ is a smooth manifold, its cotangent bundle $T^*Q$ carries a canonical 1-form $\lambda$, also called the tautological or Liouville 1-form. The exterior derivative $\omega=d\lambda$, up to sign convention, is the canonical symplectic form on $T^*Q$, also called the Poincaré two-form.

The canonical 1-form is defined by the property that, for any $v\in T_{x,\alpha}T^*Q$, $\lambda(v)=\alpha(\pi_*v)$ where $\pi:T^*Q\to Q$ is the bundle projection. In local coordinates $q^i$ on $Q$, the canonical 1-form is $\lambda = \sum_{i=1}^n p_idq^i$ where $p_i$ are fiber coordinates on the cotangent bundle such that $\alpha = \sum_{i=1}^n p_i(\alpha)dq^i$. In these coordinates, the canonical symplectic form is

$$\omega = \sum_{i=1}^n dp_i \wedge dq^i$$

The tautological 1-form $\lambda = \sum_i p_i dq^i$ has Liouville vector field $Y = \sum_i p_i \partial_{p_i}$, the fiberwise radial field. Its flow dilates covectors: $(q, p) \mapsto\left(q, e^t p\right)$.

The zero section of the cotangent bundle is Lagrangian.

=== Kähler manifolds ===
A Kähler manifold is a symplectic manifold equipped with a compatible integrable complex structure. They form a particular class of complex manifolds. A large class of examples come from complex algebraic geometry. Any smooth complex projective variety $V \subset \mathbb{CP}^n$ has a symplectic form which is the restriction of the Fubini—Study form on the projective space $\mathbb{CP}^n$.

A symplectic manifold endowed with a metric that is compatible with the symplectic form is an almost Kähler manifold in the sense that the tangent bundle has an almost complex structure, but this need not be integrable. A compatible almost-complex structure is an endomorphism $J$ of the tangent space such that $J^2=-I$, $\omega(X,JY)=-\omega(JX,Y)$, and $\omega(X,JX) \ge 0$ for all $X$. For such a compatible almost complex structure, $g(X,Y)=\omega(X,JY)$ defines a Riemannian metric. When $J$ is integrable, the resulting symplectic manifold is Kähler.

=== Coadjoint orbits ===
Coadjoint orbits of Lie groups carry natural symplectic forms. If $\mathcal O\subset\mathfrak g^*$ is the coadjoint orbit through $\xi$, then tangent vectors at $\xi$ have the form $\operatorname{ad}^*_X\xi$, and the symplectic form is given, up to sign convention, by

$$\omega_\xi(\operatorname{ad}^*_X\xi,\operatorname{ad}^*_Y\xi)=\langle \xi,[X,Y]\rangle.$$

Coadjoint orbits also arise naturally in moment map theory and symplectic reduction.

=== Lagrangian correspondences ===
A symplectomorphism can be described as a Lagrangian submanifold. If $\phi:(M,\omega_M)\to (N,\omega_N)$ is a symplectomorphism, then its graph is a Lagrangian submanifold of $\overline{M}\times N$, where $\overline{M}$ denotes $M$ equipped with the symplectic form $-\omega_M$.

More generally, a Lagrangian correspondence from $M$ to $N$ is a Lagrangian submanifold of $\overline{M}\times N$. Lagrangian correspondences are used in formulations of the symplectic category and in Floer homology.

== Generalizations ==
- Presymplectic manifolds generalize the symplectic manifolds by only requiring $\omega$ to be closed, but possibly degenerate. Any submanifold of a symplectic manifold inherits a presymplectic structure.
- Poisson manifolds generalize the symplectic manifolds by preserving only the differential-algebraic structures of a symplectic manifold.
- Dirac manifolds generalize Poisson manifolds and presymplectic manifolds by preserving even less structure. The definition is designed so that any submanifold of a Poisson manifold induces a Dirac manifold. They can be called "pre-Poisson" manifolds.
- A multisymplectic manifold of degree k is a manifold equipped with a closed nondegenerate k-form.
- A polysymplectic manifold is a Legendre bundle provided with a polysymplectic tangent-valued $(n+2)$-form; it is utilized in Hamiltonian field theory.

== See also ==
- Almost symplectic manifold
- Contact manifold – Branch of geometry—an odd-dimensional counterpart of the symplectic manifold.
- Covariant Hamiltonian field theory – Formalism in classical field theory based on Hamiltonian mechanics
- Fedosov manifold
- Poisson bracket – Operation in Hamiltonian mechanics
- Symplectic group – Mathematical group
- Symplectic matrix – Mathematical concept
- Symplectic topology – Branch of differential geometry and differential topology
- Symplectic vector space – Mathematical concept
- Symplectomorphism – Isomorphism of symplectic manifolds
- Tautological one-form – Canonical differential form
- Wirtinger inequality (2-forms)

== General and cited references ==
- McDuff, Dusa; Salamon, D. (1998). Introduction to Symplectic Topology. Oxford Mathematical Monographs. ISBN 0-19-850451-9.
- Hofer, Helmut; Zehnder, Eduard (2011). Symplectic Invariants and Hamiltonian Dynamics. Modern Birkhäuser Classics. Basel: Springer Basel AG Springer e-books. ISBN 978-3-0348-0104-1.
- Auroux, Denis. "Seminar on Mirror Symmetry".
- Meinrenken, Eckhard. "Symplectic Geometry" (PDF).
- Abraham, Ralph; Marsden, Jerrold E. (1978). Foundations of Mechanics. London: Benjamin-Cummings. See Section 3.2. ISBN 0-8053-0102-X.
- de Gosson, Maurice A. (2006). Symplectic Geometry and Quantum Mechanics. Basel: Birkhäuser Verlag. ISBN 3-7643-7574-4.
- Alan Weinstein (1971). "Symplectic manifolds and their lagrangian submanifolds". Advances in Mathematics. 6 (3): 329–46. doi:10.1016/0001-8708(71)90020-X.
- Arnold, V. I. (1990). "Ch.1, Symplectic geometry". Singularities of Caustics and Wave Fronts. Mathematics and Its Applications. Vol. 62. Dordrecht: Springer Netherlands. doi:10.1007/978-94-011-3330-2. ISBN 978-1-4020-0333-2. OCLC 22509804.
