= Bialgebroid =

In mathematics, bialgebroid may refer to

- Lie bialgebroid, a pair of two compatible Lie algebroids defined on dual vector bundles; here Lie algebroid is a vector bundle with a map into the tangent bundle over its base manifold and an anticommutative bracket operation on the space of sections of the vector bundle satisfying some axioms
- associative bialgebroid, an algebraic structure involving two algebras, the base algebra and a total algebra and a number of additional structure morphisms, generalizing associative bialgebras
- internal bialgebroid, a generalization of an associative bialgebroid where vector spaces are replaced by objects in a more general symmetric monoidal category
