= Marius Crainic =

Romanian mathematician

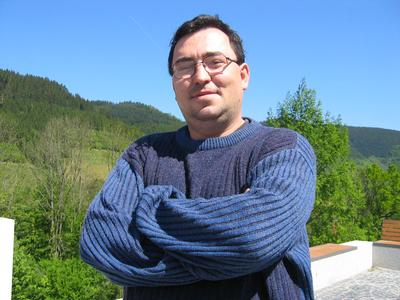
- Crainic in 2007
- Born: February 3, 1973 (age 53); Aiud, Romania
- Education: Babeș-Bolyai University; Utrecht University
- Awards: André Lichnerowicz Prize, 2008; De Bruijn prize, 2016; Dutch Mathematics Prize, 2026
- Scientific career
- Fields: Mathematics
- Workplaces: Utrecht University
- Thesis: Cyclic cohomology and characteristic classes for foliations (2000)
- Doctoral advisor: Ieke Moerdijk
- Website: webspace.science.uu.nl/~crain101/

Marius Nicolae Crainic (Romanian pronunciation: [ˈmari.us nikoˈla.e ˈkrajnik]; February 3, 1973, Aiud) is a Romanian mathematician working in the Netherlands.

== Education and career ==
Born in Aiud, Romania, Crainic competed in the International Mathematical Olympiad of 1990 receiving a Bronze medal. He obtained a bachelor's degree at Babeș-Bolyai University (Cluj-Napoca) in 1995. He then moved to the Netherlands and obtained a master's degree in 1996 at Nijmegen University. He received his Ph.D. in 2000 from Utrecht University under the supervision of Ieke Moerdijk. His Ph.D. thesis is titled "Cyclic cohomology and characteristic classes for foliations".

He was a Miller Research Fellow at the University of California, Berkeley from 2001 to 2002. He then returned to Utrecht University as a Fellow of the Royal Netherlands Academy of Arts and Sciences (KNAW). In 2007 he became an associate professor at Utrecht University, and since 2012 he is a full professor. In 2016 he was elected member of KNAW.

In 2008 Crainic was awarded the André Lichnerowicz Prize in Poisson Geometry and in 2016 he received the De Bruijn Prize. In 2026 he was awarded the Dutch Mathematics Prize for his pioneering work in the field of Poisson geometry.

In July 2020 he was an invited speaker to the 8th European congress of Mathematics, which has been rescheduled to 2021 due to the COVID-19 pandemic.

== Research ==
Crainic's research interests lie in the field of differential geometry and its interactions with topology. His specialty is Poisson geometry and modern aspects of Lie theory, with several contributions to foliation theory, symplectic geometry, Lie groupoids, non-commutative geometry, Lie pseudogroups and the geometry of PDEs.

Among his most well-known results are a solution to the long-standing problem of describing the obstructions to the integrability of Lie algebroids and a new geometric proof of Conn's linearization theorem, both written in collaboration with Rui Loja Fernandes, as well as the development of the theory of representations up to homotopy.

He is the author of more than 40 research papers in peer-reviewed journals and has supervised 13 PhD students as of 2025.
