= Ieke Moerdijk =

Dutch mathematician

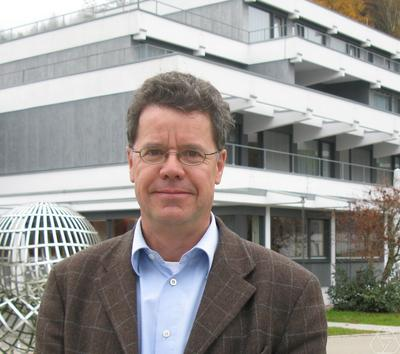
- Moerdijk at Oberwolfach in 2011
- Born: 23 January 1958 (age 68); Veenendaal, The Netherlands
- Education: University of Amsterdam
- Known for: Categorical set theory Constructive nonstandard analysis Dendroidal set
- Awards: Descartes-Huygens Prize, (2011); Spinoza Prize (2012)
- Scientific career
- Fields: Mathematics
- Workplaces: Utrecht University
- Thesis: Topics in Intuitionism and Topos Theory (1985)
- Doctoral advisor: Anne Sjerp Troelstra
- Doctoral students: Dorette Pronk
- Other notable students: Janez Mrčun; Marius Crainic

Izak "Ieke" Moerdijk (Dutch: [ˈikə ˈmuːrdɛik]; born 23 January 1958) is a Dutch mathematician, currently working at Utrecht University, who in 2012 won the Spinoza Prize.

== Education and career ==
Moerdijk studied mathematics, philosophy and general linguistics at the University of Amsterdam. He obtained his PhD cum laude in 1985 at the same institution. His thesis was entitled Topics in intuitionism and topos theory and was written under the supervision of Anne Sjerp Troelstra.

After that, he worked as postdoctoral researcher at the University of Chicago and Cambridge. From 1988 to 2011 he was professor at Utrecht University. After working at the Mathematical Institute of the Radboud University Nijmegen for a few years, he returned to Utrecht University in 2016.

In 2000 Moerdijk was an invited speaker to the 3rd European Congress of Mathematics. He was elected member of the Royal Netherlands Academy of Arts and Sciences in 2006 and of the Academia Europaea in 2014.

Moerdijk received the 2011 Descartes-Huygens prize for his contribution to French–Dutch scientific collaborations from the Académie des Sciences in Paris. In 2012 he received the Spinoza prize from the Netherlands Organisation for Scientific Research.

== Research ==
Moerdijk's research interests lie in the fields of category theory, algebraic and differential topology, and their applications to mathematical logic.

Moerdijk is seen, together with André Joyal, as one of the founders of algebraic set theory. In 1992 he wrote, together with Saunders Mac Lane, a book on topos theory that became the standard reference on the subject: Sheaves in geometry and logic. A first introduction to topos theory. In 1995 he made pioneering contributions to constructive non-standard analysis, of which he is one of the founders.

Moerdijk's research has also covered topics in differential geometry; in particular, he wrote in 2003 an influential monograph on foliations and Lie groupoids. Recently Moerdijk pursues, among other topics, research on the theory of operads, on the logic structure of quantum information theory, and on dendroidal sets.

Moerdijk has written more than a hundred publications and is the author of several influential books. He supervised 19 PhD students as of 2021.

== Selected books ==
- Joyal, André; Moerdijk, Ieke (1995) Algebraic set theory. London Mathematical Society Lecture Note Series, 220. Cambridge University Press, Cambridge. ISBN 978-0-511-75248-3
- Mac Lane, Saunders; Moerdijk, Ieke (1994) Sheaves in geometry and logic. A first introduction to topos theory. Corrected reprint of the 1992 edition. Universitext. Springer-Verlag, New York, 1994. ISBN 978-0-387-97710-2
- Moerdijk, Ieke.; Mrčun, Janez (2003) Introduction to foliations and Lie groupoids. Cambridge Studies in Advanced Mathematics, 91. Cambridge University Press, Cambridge. ISBN 978-0-511-61545-0
- Moerdijk, Ieke; Reyes, Gonzalo E. (1991) Models for smooth infinitesimal analysis. Springer-Verlag, New York. ISBN 978-0-387-97489-7
- Moerdijk, Ieke, Classifying spaces and classifying topoi, Lecture Notes in Mathematics 1616, Springer 1995. vi+94 pp. ISBN 978-3-540-60319-1
- Moerdijk, Ieke; Van Oosten, Jaap. (2018) Sets, models and proofs. Springer Nature Switzerland, Cham. ISBN 978-3-319-92414-4
