= Chehrzad Shakiban =

Iranian-American mathematician

- Born: 1951 (age 74–75); Tehran
- Education: Harvard University; Brown University
- Spouse: Peter J. Olver
- Scientific career
- Fields: Mathematics
- Workplaces: University of St. Thomas (Minnesota)
- Thesis: The Euler Operation in the Formal Calculus of Variation (1979)
- Doctoral advisor: Wendell Fleming
- Website: https://universityofsaintthomas.github.io/cshakiban/

Chehrzad "Cheri" Shakiban (born 1951) is an Iranian and American mathematician. She is the first Iranian woman to receive a doctorate in mathematics from Brown University and the first Iranian woman to become a professor of mathematics anywhere. She is retired after working for 37 years as a professor of mathematics at the University of St. Thomas (Minnesota); she is also a former director of the Institute for Mathematics and its Applications. She is the author of a textbook on applied linear algebra, and has published highly cited work on the use of differential invariants in image recognition.

== Early life and education ==
Shakiban was born in 1951 in Tehran, to a family of the Baháʼí Faith. As a high school student, she came to the US for her final year of high school study through the AFS Intercultural Programs, at a high school in St. Louis, Missouri. After receiving a US high school diploma and returning to Iran, she took a job at Pakistan's Embassy to Iran and studied at night, eventually earning an Iranian high school diploma by examination in 1970 rather than returning to school.

She became an undergraduate mathematics student at the National University of Iran, mentored in number theory there by Ahmad Mirbagheri and completing her degree program in three years. In the last year of her studies, a conference brought Paul Erdős, Paul Halmos, and Garrett Birkhoff to Tehran, and she served as their guide and translator. At the invitation of Birkhoff, and with the support of the Iranian government, she went to Harvard University in the US as a special student from 1973 to 1975, receiving a master's degree with a thesis in the calculus of variations.

She continued her studies at Brown University from 1975 to 1979, working there with Wendell Fleming. During this time, in 1976, she married mathematician Peter J. Olver, a student of Birkhoff. She followed her husband to the University of Oxford in England in 1978, continuing her studies at Brown remotely. She became a refugee from Iran after the Iranian revolution in 1978 and 1979, in which her brother was killed. Pregnant with her first child, she successfully defended her dissertation, The Euler Operator in the Formal Calculus of Variations, in 1979, becoming the first Iranian woman to complete a doctorate in mathematics from Brown University.

== Career and later life ==
After receiving her doctorate, Shakiban became a tutor in Somerville College, Oxford in 1979. In 1980, her husband took a position at the University of Minnesota and she moved with him, taking a teaching position at St. Catherine University.

She moved to the University of St. Thomas (Minnesota) in 1983. She was the first woman to chair the Department of Mathematics at the University of St. Thomas, from 1996 to 2004, and directed the Institute for Mathematics and its Applications from 2006 to 2008, later becoming its associate director for diversity. She retired in 2020, but continues as a senior fellow in the university's Center for Common Good.

As an expatriate Iranian Baháʼí, she has taught online courses aimed at Iranian members of the Baháʼí Faith, who have been blocked from accessing higher education in Iran, and has protested the treatment of Baháʼí in Iran.

== Recognition ==
In 2024, Heriot Watt University in Scotland gave Shakiban an honorary doctorate, recognizing her as "a renowned international figure in higher education, teaching and inspiring generations of mathematicians for over four decades".

== Selected publications ==
- Calabi, Eugenio; Olver, Peter J.; Shakiban, Chehrzad; Tannenbaum, Allen R.; Haker, Steven (1998), "Differential and numerically invariant signature curves applied to object recognition", International Journal of Computer Vision, 26 (2): 107–135, doi:10.1023/A:1007992709392
- Olver, Peter J.; Shakiban, Chehrzad (2006), Applied Linear Algebra, Upper Saddle River, New Jersey: Pearson Prentice Hall, ISBN 0-13-147382-4, MR 2127863; 2nd ed., Springer, 2018
