= Lie's third theorem =

Theorem in the mathematics of Lie's theory

In the mathematics of Lie theory, Lie's third theorem states that every finite-dimensional Lie algebra $\mathfrak{g}$ over the real numbers is associated to a Lie group $G$. The theorem is part of the Lie group–Lie algebra correspondence.

Historically, the third theorem referred to a different but related result. The two preceding theorems of Sophus Lie, restated in modern language, relate to the infinitesimal transformations of a group action on a smooth manifold. The third theorem on the list stated the Jacobi identity for the infinitesimal transformations of a local Lie group. Conversely, in the presence of a Lie algebra of vector fields, integration gives a local Lie group action. The result now known as the third theorem provides an intrinsic and global converse to the original theorem.

== Historical notes ==
The equivalence between the category of simply connected real Lie groups and finite-dimensional real Lie algebras is usually called (in the literature of the second half of 20th century) Cartan's or the Cartan-Lie theorem as it was proved by Élie Cartan. Sophus Lie had previously proved the infinitesimal version: local solvability of the Maurer-Cartan equation, or the equivalence between the category of finite-dimensional Lie algebras and the category of local Lie groups.

Lie listed his results as three direct and three converse theorems. The infinitesimal variant of Cartan's theorem was essentially Lie's third converse theorem. In an influential book Jean-Pierre Serre called it the third theorem of Lie. The name is historically somewhat misleading, but often used in connection to generalizations.

Serre provided two proofs in his book: one based on Ado's theorem and another recounting the proof by Élie Cartan.

== Proofs ==
There are several proofs of Lie's third theorem, each of them employing different algebraic and/or geometric techniques.

=== Algebraic proof ===
The classical proof is straightforward but relies on Ado's theorem, whose proof is algebraic and highly non-trivial. Ado's theorem states that any finite-dimensional Lie algebra can be represented by matrices. As a consequence, integrating such algebra of matrices via the matrix exponential yields a Lie group integrating the original Lie algebra.

=== Cohomological proof ===
A more geometric proof is due to Élie Cartan and was published by Willem van Est. This proof uses induction on the dimension of the center and it involves the Chevalley-Eilenberg complex.

=== Geometric proof ===
A different geometric proof was discovered in 2000 by Duistermaat and Kolk. Unlike the previous ones, it is a constructive proof: the integrating Lie group is built as the quotient of the (infinite-dimensional) Banach Lie group of paths on the Lie algebra by a suitable subgroup. This proof was influential for Lie theory since it paved the way to the generalisation of Lie third theorem for Lie groupoids and Lie algebroids.

== See also ==
- Lie group integrator
