= Peter J. Olver =

American mathematician (born 1952)

Peter John Olver
- Born: January 11, 1952 (age 74); Middlesex, England
- Education: Brown University; Harvard University
- Known for: Symmetry groups of partial differential equations
- Spouse: Chehrzad Shakiban
- Scientific career
- Fields: Mathematics
- Workplaces: University of Maryland; University of Minnesota
- Thesis: Symmetry Groups of Partial Differential Equations (1976)
- Doctoral advisor: Garrett Birkhoff
- Doctoral students: Rui Loja Fernandes

Peter John Olver (11 January 1952, Twickenham) is a British-American mathematician working in differential geometry.

== Education and career ==
After moving to the USA in 1961, Olver obtained a bachelor's degree in Applied Mathematics at Brown University in 1973 and a PhD in Mathematics at Harvard University in 1976. His PhD thesis was entitled "Symmetry Groups of Partial Differential Equations" and was written under the supervision of Garrett Birkhoff.

He worked as a L.E. Dickson Instructor in Mathematics at University of Chicago (1976-1978) and as a research fellow at University of Oxford (1978-1980). He then moved to University of Minnesota as assistant professor, and he became full professor in the same university in 1985. Between 1992 and 1993 he was professor at University of Maryland.

Olver was member of the board of directors of Foundations of Computational Mathematics from 2002 to 2014. He was elected fellow of the American Mathematical Society in 2013 and of the Society for Industrial and Applied Mathematics in 2014, for "developing new geometric methods for differential equations leading to applications in fluid mechanics, elasticity, quantum mechanics, and image processing." Olver is also member of International Society for the Interaction of Mechanics and Mathematics and an elected fellow of the Institute of Physics.

== Research ==
Olver's primary research fields are differential geometry and mathematical physics. His main interests involve the application of Lie groups and symmetries to the geometry of differential equations, as well as well the theories of moving frames and Cartan's equivalence method, differential invariants and pseudogroups.

He has also contributed to various topics in applied mathematics, including image processing and computer vision, wave and fluid mechanics,, quasi-exact solvability and elasticity.

He has written five books and over 150 research papers in peer-reviewed journals. In 2003, Olver was one of the top 234 most cited mathematicians in the world. He has supervised 23 PhD students.

== Personal life ==
Olver married Iranian mathematician Chehrzad Shakiban in 1976.

== Books ==
- Olver, P. J. (1986), Applications of Lie Groups to Differential Equations, Graduate Texts in Mathematics, vol. 107, Springer, doi:10.1007/978-1-4684-0274-2, ISBN 0387940073
- Olver, Peter J.; Sattinger, David H., eds. (1990). Solitons in Physics, Mathematics, and Nonlinear Optics. New York, NY: Springer New York. ISBN 978-1-4613-9033-6. OCLC 852788413.
- Olver, P. J. (1995), Equivalence, Invariants and Symmetry, Cambridge University Press, doi:10.1017/CBO9780511609565, ISBN 0521101042
- Olver, P. J. (1999), Classical Invariant Theory, Cambridge University Press, doi:10.1017/CBO9780511623660, ISBN 0521558212
- Olver, Peter J.; Tannenbaum, Allen, eds. (2003). Mathematical methods in computer vision. New York: Springer. ISBN 0-387-00497-1. OCLC 51553365.
- Olver, P. J. (2014), Introduction to Partial Differential Equations, Undergraduate Texts in Mathematics, Springer, doi:10.1007/978-3-319-02099-0, ISBN 978-3319020983, S2CID 220617008
- Olver, P. J.; Shakiban, C. (2018), Applied Linear Algebra, Springer, doi:10.1007/978-3-319-91041-3, ISBN 978-0131473829
