= Chelsea Walton =

African-American mathematician & academic

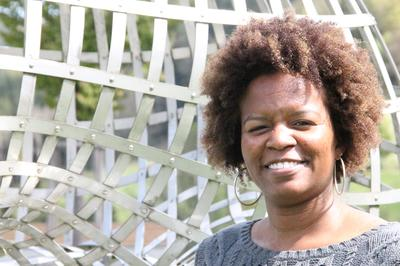
- Walton at Oberwolfach in 2014
- Born: 1983 (age 42–43); Detroit, Michigan, U.S.
- Education: Michigan State University; University of Michigan
- Awards: Sloan Research Fellowship; André Lichnerowicz Prize
- Scientific career
- Fields: Mathematics
- Workplaces: Rice University
- Thesis: On Degenerations and Deformations of Sklyanin Algebras (2011)
- Doctoral advisors: Toby Stafford; Karen E. Smith
- Website: math.rice.edu/~notlaw

Chelsea Walton is an American mathematician whose research interests include noncommutative algebra, noncommutative algebraic geometry, symmetry in quantum mechanics, Hopf algebras, and quantum groups. She is a full professor at Rice University and a Sloan Research Fellow.

== Education and career ==
Walton is African-American, originally from Detroit, Michigan, and was educated in the Detroit public schools. As a child she made a letter frequency table from her children's dictionary, and as a high school student, seeking a way to "do logic puzzles all day and get paid for this", she was already planning a career as a mathematics professor.

She graduated from Michigan State University in 2005, and completed her PhD at the University of Michigan in 2011. Her dissertation, On Degenerations and Deformations of Sklyanin Algebras, was jointly supervised by Toby Stafford and Karen E. Smith, and based in part on her work as a visiting student at the University of Manchester, where Stafford had moved.

Walton did postdoctoral research at the University of Washington and the Mathematical Sciences Research Institute, and became a C. L. E. Moore instructor at the Massachusetts Institute of Technology from 2012 to 2015. She came to Temple University as Selma Lee Bloch Brown Assistant Professor of Mathematics in 2015. She moved to the University of Illinois in 2018. She joined the faculty at Rice University in 2020.

== Recognition ==
Walton was named a Sloan Fellow in 2017, becoming the fourth African-American to win a Sloan Fellowship in mathematics. Walton was also recognized by Mathematically Gifted & Black as a Black History Month 2017 Honoree. In 2018 she won the André Lichnerowicz Prize in Poisson geometry, the first woman to be awarded this prize. The award citation noted her research on Sklyanin algebras in Poisson geometry, on the actions of Hopf algebras, and on the universal enveloping algebra of the Witt algebra. She was elected as a Fellow of the American Mathematical Society, in the 2025 class of fellows.
