= Moving frames method =

The equivalence moving frames method was introduced by E. Cartan to solve the equivalence problems on submanifolds under the action of a transformation group. In 1974, P. A. Griffiths had success with uniqueness and existence problem on geometric differential equations using the Cartan method of Lie groups and moving frames. Later on, in the 1990s, Fels and Peter J. Olver have presented the moving co-frame method as a new formulation of the classical Cartan's method for finite-dimensional Lie group actions on manifolds. In the last two decades, the moving frames method has been developed in the general algorithmic and equivariant framework which gives several new powerful tools for finding and classifying the equivalence and symmetry properties of submanifolds, differential invariants, and their syzygies.

The moving frames method is applied on a wide variety of problems, including solving the basic symmetry and equivalence problems of polynomials that form the foundation of classical invariant theory, classifying the differential invariants for Lie group actions on functions, analyzing the algebraic structure of differential invariants of PDEs, geometry of curves and surfaces in homogeneous spaces.

== See also ==
- Moving frame § Method of the moving frame
- Cartan's equivalence method
