= Atiyah algebroid =

In mathematics, the Atiyah algebroid, or Atiyah sequence, of a principal $G$-bundle $P$ over a manifold $M$, where $G$ is a Lie group, is the Lie algebroid of the gauge groupoid of $P$. Explicitly, it is given by the following short exact sequence of vector bundles over $M$:

$$0 \to P\times_G \mathfrak g\to TP/G \to TM\to 0.$$

It is named after Michael Atiyah, who introduced the construction to study the existence theory of complex analytic connections. It plays a crucial example in the integrability of (transitive) Lie algebroids, and it has applications in gauge theory and geometric mechanics.

== Definitions ==
=== As a sequence ===
For any fiber bundle $P$ over a manifold $M$, the differential $d\pi$ of the projection $\pi: P \to M$ defines a short exact sequence:

$$0 \to VP \to TP \xrightarrow{d\pi} \pi^* TM\to 0$$

of vector bundles over $P$, where the vertical bundle $VP$ is the kernel of $d\pi$.

If $P$ is a principal $G$-bundle, then the group $G$ acts on the vector bundles in this sequence. Moreover, since the vertical bundle $VP$ is isomorphic to the trivial vector bundle $P \times \mathfrak{g} \to P$, where $\mathfrak{g}$ is the Lie algebra of $G$, its quotient by the diagonal $G$ action is the adjoint bundle $P \times_G \mathfrak{g}$. In conclusion, the quotient by $G$ of the exact sequence above yields a short exact sequence:
$$0 \to P\times_G \mathfrak g\to TP/G \to TM\to 0$$
of vector bundles over $P/G \cong M$, which is called the Atiyah sequence of $P$.

=== As a Lie algebroid ===
Recall that any principal $G$-bundle $P \to M$ has an associated Lie groupoid, called its gauge groupoid, whose objects are points of $M$, and whose morphisms are elements of the quotient of $P \times P$ by the diagonal action of $G$, with source and target given by the two projections of $M$. By definition, the Atiyah algebroid of $P$ is the Lie algebroid $A \to M$ of its gauge groupoid.

It follows that $A = TP/G$, while the anchor map $A \to TM$ is given by the differential $d\pi: TP \to TM$, which is $G$-invariant. Last, the kernel of the anchor is isomorphic precisely to $P \times_G \mathfrak{g}$.

The Atiyah sequence yields a short exact sequence of $\mathcal{C}^{\infty}(M)$-modules by taking the space of sections of the vector bundles. More precisely, the sections of the Atiyah algebroid of $P$ is the Lie algebra of $G$-invariant vector fields on $P$ under Lie bracket, which is an extension of the Lie algebra of vector fields on $M$ by the $G$-invariant vertical vector fields. In algebraic or analytic contexts, it is often convenient to view the Atiyah sequence as an exact sequence of sheaves of local sections of vector bundles.

== Examples ==
- The Atiyah algebroid of the principal $G$-bundle $G \to *$ is the Lie algebra $\mathfrak{g} \to *$
- The Atiyah algebroid of the principal $\{e\}$-bundle $M \to M$ is the tangent algebroid $TM \to M$
- Given a transitive $G$-action on $M$, the Atiyah algebroid of the principal bundle $G \to M$, with structure group the isotropy group $H \subseteq G$ of the action at an arbitrary point, is the action algebroid $\mathfrak{h} \times M \to M$
- The Atiyah algebroid of the frame bundle of a vector bundle $E \to M$ is the general linear algebroid $\mathrm{Der}(E) \to M$ (sometimes also called Atiyah algebroid of $E$)

== Properties ==
=== Transitivity and integrability ===
The Atiyah algebroid of a principal $G$-bundle $P \to M$ is always:

- Transitive (so its unique orbit is the entire $M$ and its isotropy Lie algebra bundle is the associated bundle $P \times_G \mathfrak{g}$)
- Integrable (to the gauge groupoid of $P$)

Note that these two properties are independent. Integrable Lie algebroids does not need to be transitive; conversely, transitive Lie algebroids (often called abstract Atiyah sequences) are not necessarily integrable.

While any transitive Lie groupoid is isomorphic to some gauge groupoid, not all transitive Lie algebroids are Atiyah algebroids of some principal bundle. Integrability is the crucial property to distinguish the two concepts: a transitive Lie algebroid is integrable if and only if it is isomorphic to the Atiyah algebroid of some principal bundle.

=== Relations with connections ===
Right splittings $\sigma: TM \to A$ of the Atiyah sequence of a principal bundle $P \to M$ are in bijective correspondence with principal connections on $P \to M$. Similarly, the curvatures of such connections correspond to the two forms $\Omega_\sigma \in \Omega^2(M,P[\mathfrak{g}])$ defined by:
$$\Omega_\sigma (X,Y):= [\sigma(X),\sigma(Y)]_A - \sigma ([X,Y]_{\mathfrak{X}(M)})$$

=== Morphisms ===
Any morphism $\phi: P \to P'$ of $G$-principal bundles induces a Lie algebroid morphism $d\phi: TP/G \to TP'/G$ between the respective Atiyah algebroids.
