= Air sports at the 2001 World Games – Open formation skydiving =

Parachuting open formation skydiving at the World Games
- Venue: Ogata Athletic Field, Ōgata, Akita, Japan
- Date: 17–19 August 2001
- Competitors: 30 from 6 nations

Medalists
1st place, gold medalist(s)		John Eagle; Craig Girard; Neal Houston; Mark Kirkby; Marc Steinbaugh	United States
2nd place, silver medalist(s)		Lise Aune; Dag Einar Hernes; Pål Kolbenstvedt; Carl-Erik Tuv; Torstein Valen	Norway
3rd place, bronze medalist(s)		Jérôme David; Marin Ferré; Julien Losantos; Davidé Moy; Laurent Pechberty	France

The open formation skydiving event at the 2001 World Games in Akita was played from 17 to 19 August. A total of thirty parachuters, from six nations, participated in the tournament. The competition took place at Ogata Athletic Field in Ōgata.

== Competition format ==
A total of seven rounds were contested. The team with the most points is the winner.

== Results ==
Rank	Nation	Team	R1	R2	R3	R4	R5	R6	R7	Total	Average
1st place, gold medalist(s)	United States	John Eagle; Craig Girard; Neal Houston; Mark Kirkby; Marc Steinbaugh	28	20	18	22	19	21	21	149	21.19
2nd place, silver medalist(s)	Norway	Lise Aune; Dag Einar Hernes; Pål Kolbenstvedt; Carl-Erik Tuv; Torstein Valen	26	19	21	21	18	21	20	146	20.86
3rd place, bronze medalist(s)	France	Jérôme David; Marin Ferré; Julien Losantos; Davidé Moy; Laurent Pechberty	26	17	19	21	17	20	20	140	20.00
4	Great Britain	Peter Allum; Steve Hamilton; John McIver; Toby Stafford; Robert Stevenson	26	18	17	18	16	18	19	132	18.86
5	Russia	Sergey Chenin; Viktor Gorbounkov; Vladimir Pavlenko; Oleg Shalamykhin; Elena Vertiprakhova	22	16	16	19	16	18	17	124	17.71
6	Japan	Kei Baba; Shin Ishikawa; Tomoko Makino; Toshihiko Makino; Naoki Yamamoto	14	9	12	11	8	13	10	77	11.00
