= Representation up to homotopy =

Concept in mathematics

A representation up to homotopy has several meanings. One of the earliest appeared in physics, in constrained Hamiltonian systems. The essential idea is lifting a non-representation on a quotient to a representation up to strong homotopy on a resolution of the quotient. As a concept in differential geometry, it generalizes the notion of representation of a Lie algebra to Lie algebroids and nontrivial vector bundles. As such, it was introduced by Abad and Crainic.

As a motivation consider a regular Lie algebroid (A,ρ,[.,.]) (regular meaning that the anchor ρ has constant rank) where we have two natural A-connections on g(A) = ker ρ and ν(A)= TM/im ρ respectively:

$$\nabla\colon \Gamma(A)\times\Gamma(\mathfrak{g}(A))\to\Gamma(\mathfrak{g}(A)): \nabla_{\!\phi\,}\psi:=[\phi,\psi],$$
$$\nabla\colon \Gamma(A)\times\Gamma(\nu(A))\to\Gamma(\nu(A)): \nabla_{\!\phi\,}\overline{X}:=\overline{[\rho(\phi),X]}.$$

In the deformation theory of the Lie algebroid A there is a long exact sequence

$$\dots\to H^n(A,\mathfrak{g}(A))\to H^n_{def}(A)\to H^{n-1}(A,\nu(A))\to H^{n-1}(A,\mathfrak{g}(A))\to\dots$$

This suggests that the correct cohomology for the deformations (here denoted as H_{def}) comes from the direct sum of the two modules g(A) and ν(A) and should be called adjoint representation. Note however that in the more general case where ρ does not have constant rank we cannot easily define the representations g(A) and ν(A). Instead we should consider the 2-term complex A→TM and a representation on it. This leads to the notion explained here.

== Definition ==
Let (A,ρ,[.,.]) be a Lie algebroid over a smooth manifold M and let Ω(A) denote its Lie algebroid complex. Let further E be a $\mathbb{Z}$-graded vector bundle over M and Ω(A,E) = Ω(A) ⊗ Γ(E) be its $\mathbb{Z}$-graded A-cochains with values in E. A representation up to homotopy of A on E is a differential operator D that maps

$$D\colon \Omega^\bullet(A,E)\to\Omega^{\bullet+1}(A,E),$$

fulfills the Leibniz rule

$$D(\alpha\wedge\beta) = (D\alpha)\wedge\beta + (-1)^{|\alpha|}\alpha\wedge(D\beta),$$

and squares to zero, i.e. D^{2} = 0.

=== Homotopy operators ===
A representation up to homotopy as introduced above is equivalent to the following data

- a degree 1 operator ∂: E → E that squares to 0,
- an A-connection ∇ on E compatible as $\nabla\circ\partial=\partial\circ\nabla$,
- an End(E)-valued A-2-form ω_{2} of total degree 1, such that the curvature fulfills $\partial\omega_2+R_\nabla=0,$
- End(E)-valued A-p-forms ω_{p} of total degree 1 that fulfill the homotopy relations....

The correspondence is characterized as

$$D = \partial +\nabla+\omega_2+\omega_3+\cdots. \,$$

=== Homomorphisms ===
A homomorphism between representations up to homotopy (E,D_{E}) and (F,D_{F}) of the same Lie algebroid A is a degree 0 map Φ:Ω(A,E) → Ω(A,F) that commutes with the differentials, i.e.

$$D_F\circ\Phi = \Phi\circ D_E. \,$$

An isomorphism is now an invertible homomorphism. We denote Rep^{∞} the category of equivalence classes of representations up to homotopy together with equivalence classes of homomorphisms.

In the sense of the above decomposition of D into a cochain map ∂, a connection ∇, and higher homotopies, we can also decompose the Φ as Φ_{0} + Φ_{1} + ... with

$$\Phi_i\in\Omega^i(A,\mathrm{Hom}^{-i}(E,F))$$

and then the compatibility condition reads

$$\partial\Phi_n +d_\nabla(\Phi_{n-1})+[\omega_2,\Phi_{n-2}]+\cdots+[\omega_n,\Phi_0] = 0.$$

== Examples ==
Examples are usual representations of Lie algebroids or more specifically Lie algebras, i.e. modules.

Another example is given by a p-form ω_{p} together with $E = M \times \mathbb{R}[0] \oplus \mathbb{R}[p]$ and the operator D = ∇ + ω_{p} where ∇ is the flat connection on the trivial bundle $M \times \mathbb{R}$.

Given a representation up to homotopy as D = ∂ + ∇ + ω_{2} + ... we can construct a new representation up to homotopy by conjugation, i.e.

D' = ∂ − ∇ + ω_{2} − ω_{3} + −....

=== Adjoint representation ===
Given a Lie algebroid (A,ρ,[.,.]) together with a connection ∇ on its vector bundle we can define two associated A-connections as follows

$$\nabla^{bas}_{\!\phi\,}\psi := [\phi,\psi]+\nabla_{\!\rho(\psi)\,}\phi,$$
$$\nabla^{bas}_{\!\phi\,}X := [\rho(\phi),X]+\rho(\nabla_{\!X\,}\phi).$$

Moreover, we can introduce the mixed curvature as

$$R^{bas}(\phi,\psi)(X):= \nabla_{\!X\,}[\phi,\psi]-[\nabla_{\!X\,}\phi,\psi]-[\phi,\nabla_{\!X\,}\psi] -\nabla_{\!\nabla^{bas}_{\!\psi\,}X\,}\phi +\nabla_{\!\nabla^{bas}_{\!\psi\,}X\,}\phi.$$

This curvature measures the compatibility of the Lie bracket with the connection and is one of the two conditions of A together with TM forming a matched pair of Lie algebroids.

The first observation is that this term decorated with the anchor map ρ, accordingly, expresses the curvature of both connections ∇^{bas}. Secondly we can match up all three ingredients to a representation up to homotopy as:

$$D = \rho +\nabla^{bas}+R^{bas}.$$

Another observation is that the resulting representation up to homotopy is independent of the chosen connection ∇, basically because the difference between two A-connections is an (A − 1 -form with values in End(E).
