= Projective differential geometry =

Geometry

In mathematics, projective differential geometry is the study of differential geometry, from the point of view of properties of mathematical objects such as functions, diffeomorphisms, and submanifolds, that are invariant under transformations of the projective group. This is a mixture of the approaches from Riemannian geometry of studying invariances, and of the Erlangen program of characterizing geometries according to their group symmetries.

The area was much studied by mathematicians from around 1890 for a generation (by J. G. Darboux, George Henri Halphen, Ernest Julius Wilczynski, E. Bompiani, G. Fubini, Eduard Čech, amongst others), without a comprehensive theory of differential invariants emerging.

Élie Cartan formulated the idea of a general projective connection, as part of his method of moving frames; abstractly speaking, this is the level of generality at which the Erlangen program can be reconciled with differential geometry, while it also develops the oldest part of the theory (for the projective line), namely the Schwarzian derivative, the simplest projective differential invariant.

Further work from the 1930s onwards was carried out by J. Kanitani, Shiing-Shen Chern, A. P. Norden, G. Bol, S. P. Finikov and G. F. Laptev. Even the basic results on osculation of curves, a manifestly projective-invariant topic, lack any comprehensive theory. The ideas of projective differential geometry recur in mathematics and its applications, but the formulations given are still rooted in the language of the early twentieth century.

== See also ==
- Affine geometry of curves
