= Rui Loja Fernandes =

Portuguese mathematician (born 1965)

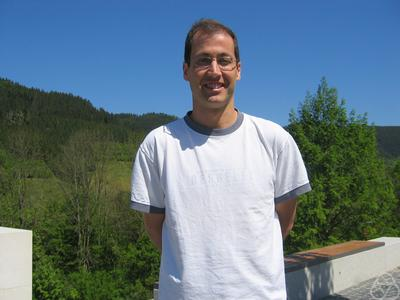
- Born: July 20, 1965 (age 61); Coimbra, Portugal
- Education: University of Minnesota
- Scientific career
- Fields: Mathematics
- Workplaces: Instituto Superior Técnico, University of Illinois at Urbana-Champaign
- Thesis: Completely Integrable bi-Hamiltonian Systems (1994)
- Doctoral advisor: Peter Olver

Rui António Loja Fernandes (July 20, 1965, Coimbra) is a Portuguese mathematician working in the USA.

== Education and career ==
Fernandes obtained a bachelor's degree in Physics Engineering at Instituto Superior Técnico (Lisbon, Portugal) in 1988. He then moved to the USA and earned a master's degree in Mathematics in 1991 and a PhD in Mathematics in 1994 from the University of Minnesota. His PhD thesis was entitled "Completely Integrable bi-Hamiltonian Systems" and has been written under the supervision of Peter J. Olver.

In 1994 he returned to Instituto Superior Técnico, where he worked first as Assistant Professor (1994-2002), and then as Associated Professor (2003-2007) and Full Professor (2007-2012).

In 2012 he moved back to the USA and since then he is the Lois M. Lackner Professor of Mathematics at University of Illinois at Urbana–Champaign. In 2016, he became a Fellow of the American Mathematical Society "for contributions to the study of Poisson geometry and Lie algebroids, and for service to the mathematical community."

== Research ==
Fernandes research focusses on differential geometry, more precisely on Poisson and symplectic geometry. Among his most well-known results are a solution to the long-standing problem of describing the obstructions to the integrability of Lie algebroids and a new geometric proof of Conn's linearization theorem, both written in collaboration with Marius Crainic.

He is the author of more than 40 research papers in peer-reviewed journals and has supervised 6 PhD students as of 2021.
