= Thomas Willwacher =

German mathematician and mathematical physicist

Thomas H. Willwacher
- Born: 12 April 1983 (age 43); Freiburg im Breisgau, West Germany
- Education: ETH Zurich
- Awards: André Lichnerowicz Prize (2012); EMS Prize (2016)
- Scientific career
- Fields: Mathematical physics
- Workplaces: ETH Zurich
- Thesis: Cyclic formality (2009)
- Doctoral advisor: Giovanni Felder

Thomas Hans Willwacher (born 12 April 1983) is a German mathematician and mathematical physicist working as a Professor at the Institute of Mathematics, ETH Zurich.

== Biography ==
Willwacher completed his PhD at ETH Zurich in 2009 with a thesis on "Cyclic Formality", under the supervision of Giovanni Felder, Alberto Cattaneo, and Anton Alekseev. He was a Junior member of the Harvard Society of Fellows from 2010 to 2013.

He joined the University of Zurich as an assistant professor in 2013, and was promoted to associate professor in 2015.

== Research and recognition ==
In July 2016 Willwacher was awarded a prize from the European Mathematical Society for "his striking and important research in a variety of mathematical fields: homotopical algebra, geometry, topology and mathematical physics, including deep results related to Kontsevich's formality theorem and the relation between Kontsevich's graph complex and the Grothendieck-Teichmüller Lie algebra".

Notable results of Willwacher include the proof of Maxim Kontsevich's cyclic formality conjecture and the proof that the Grothendieck–Teichmüller Lie algebra is isomorphic to the degree zero cohomology of Kontsevich's graph complex.
