= Dorette Pronk =

Dutch-Canadian mathematician

Dorothea Ariette (Dorette) Pronk (born 1968) is a Dutch and Canadian mathematician specializing in category theory and categorical approaches to differentiation. She is a professor of mathematics at Dalhousie University. As well as for her research, she is also known for her work promoting mathematics competitions in Canada.

== Education and career ==
Pronk is originally from Rotterdam. She became a mathematics student at Utrecht University in The Netherlands, where she earned a master's degree in 1991 and completed her Ph.D. in 1995. Her doctoral dissertation, Groupoid Representations for Sheaves on Orbifolds, was jointly promoted by Dirk van Dalen and Ieke Moerdijk. She took a faculty position at Dalhousie University in 2000, after previously being a postdoctoral researcher there. She is a professor of mathematics at Dalhousie.

Pronk began working in mathematics competitions as an observer for the Canadian team at the 1998 and 1999 International Mathematical Olympiads. She chaired Canada's committee on the IMO from 2014 to 2015, the mathematical competitions committee of the Canadian Mathematical Society beginning in 2016, and Canada's committee on the European Girls' Mathematical Olympiad since 2018. She has also served as a leader of Canada's mathematics team. At Dalhousie, she has organized a mathematics challenge club and Math circles focused both on Nova Scotia students and on First Nations students.

== Recognition ==
Pronk was the 2023 recipient of the Graham Wright Award for Distinguished Service of the Canadian Mathematical Society. In the same year she was named as a Fellow of the Canadian Mathematical Society.

== Personal life ==
Pronk was raised in a strict denomination of Reformed (Calvinist) Christianity in the Netherlands. After resisting the call because of her strict background, she has been participating in messianic dance through All Nations Christian Reformed Church in Halifax, Nova Scotia since 2002.
