= Giovanni Felder =

Swiss physicist and mathematician

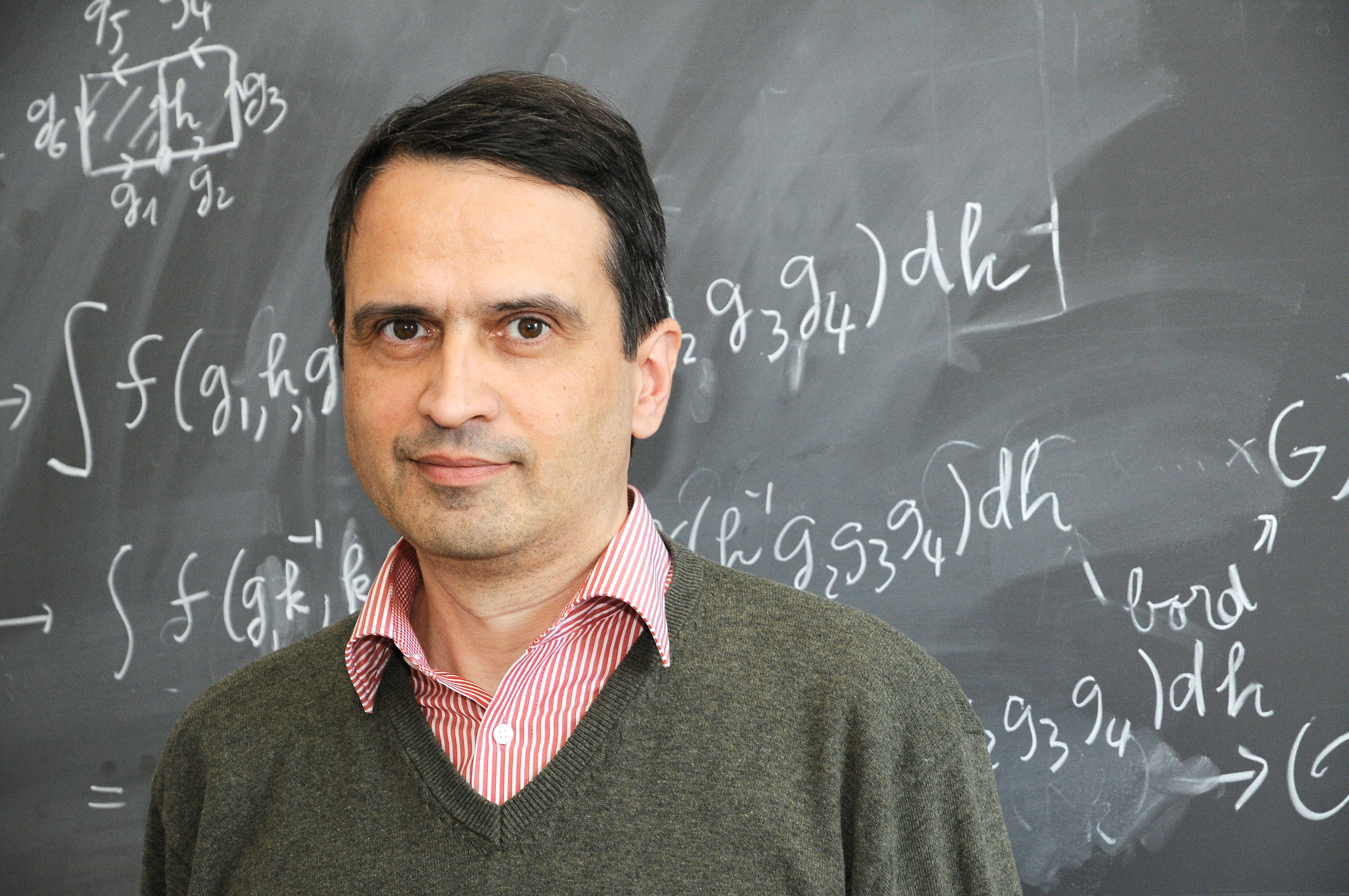
- Giovanni Felder in 2013
- Born: 18 November 1958 (age 67); Aarau, Switzerland
- Education: ETH Zürich
- Scientific career
- Fields: Mathematical Physics
- Workplaces: ETH Zürich
- Thesis: Renormalization Group, Tree Expansion, and Non-renormalizable Quantum Field Theories (1986)
- Doctoral advisor: Jürg Martin Fröhlich
- Doctoral students: Thomas Willwacher
- Website: https://people.math.ethz.ch/~felder/

Giovanni Felder (18 November 1958 in Aarau) is a Swiss mathematical physicist and mathematician, working at ETH Zurich. He specializes in algebraic and geometric properties of integrable models of statistical mechanics and quantum field theory.

== Education and career ==
Felder attended school in Lugano and Willisau District. He studied physics at ETH Zurich, where he graduated with M.Sc. in 1982 and with Ph.D. in 1986. His doctoral dissertation, entitled Renormalization Group, Tree Expansion, and Non-renormalizable Quantum Field Theories, was supervised by Jürg Fröhlich (and Konrad Osterwalder).

Felder held postdoctoral positions from 1986 to 1988 at IHES, from 1988 to 1989 at the Institute for Advanced Study, and from 1989 to 1991 at the Institute of Theoretical Physics, ETH Zurich.

From 1991 to 1994 he became an assistant professor of mathematics at ETH Zurich. From 1994 to 1996 he worked as professor of mathematics at the University of North Carolina. In 1996 he returned at ETH Zurich as professor of mathematics. From 2013 to 2019, he was the director of the Institute for Theoretical Studies at ETH Zurich.

In 1994 Felder was an invited speaker at the International Congress of Mathematicians in Zurich. He was elected member of the Academia Europaea in 2012 and fellow of the American Mathematical Society in 2013.

== Research ==
Felder's research involves mathematical problems motivated by physical ideas.

In the late 1980s Felder did research with Krzysztof Gawedzki and Antti Kupiainen on the geometry of the Wess-Zumino-Witten model in conformal field theory. In 1989 he introduced a BRST approach to the "minimal two-dimensional conformal invariant models of Belavin, Polyakov and Zamolodchikov."

With Alexander Varchenko and Vitaly Tarasov, Felder did research on various integrable models in quantum field theory and statistical mechanics and resulting special functions (such as the elliptic gamma function, elliptic quantum groups, and elliptic Macdonald polynomials).

With Alberto Cattaneo in 2000 he gave a path integral interpretation of Kontsevich's deformation quantization of Poisson manifolds as well as a description of the symplectic groupoid integrating a Poisson manifold as an infinite-dimensional symplectic quotient.

He supervised 22 doctoral students as of 2022, including Thomas Willwacher.
