= André Lichnerowicz Prize =

Distinction in mathematics

The André Lichnerowicz Prize for Poisson geometry is a mathematics distinction awarded since 2008 to reward notable contributions to Poisson geometry.

== Description of the prize ==
The prize is assigned once every two years during the International Conference on Poisson Geometry in Mathematics and Physics to one or two young researchers who obtained their doctorate in the eight years before the Conference.

It is awarded by a jury composed by members of the scientific and advisory committees of the conference, and its amount is financed by one of the hosting institutions or funding bodies.

The 2020 edition of the Poisson conference was postponed to 2021 and then cancelled due to the COVID-19 pandemic; accordingly, the André Lichnerowicz Prize for 2020 was assigned online on May 27, 2021, in occasion of the Global Poisson Webinar.

The prize is named in memory of André Lichnerowicz (1915-1998), whose works have been fundamental in establishing Poisson geometry as a branch of modern mathematics.

== Laureates ==
- 2026: Daniel Álvarez and Cédric Oms
- 2024: Ana Balibanu and Francis Bischoff
- 2022: Yiannis Loizides and Álvaro del Pino Gómez
- 2020: Pavel Safronov and Xiaomeng Xu
- 2018: Brent Pym and Chelsea Walton
- 2016: Pavel Mnev and Travis Schedler
- 2014: David Li-Bland and Ioan Mărcuţ
- 2012: Thomas Willwacher
- 2010: Marco Gualtieri and Xiang Tang
- 2008: Marius Crainic and Henrique Bursztyn.
