= Alberto Cattaneo =

Italian mathematician and physicist (born 1967)

Alberto Sergio Cattaneo
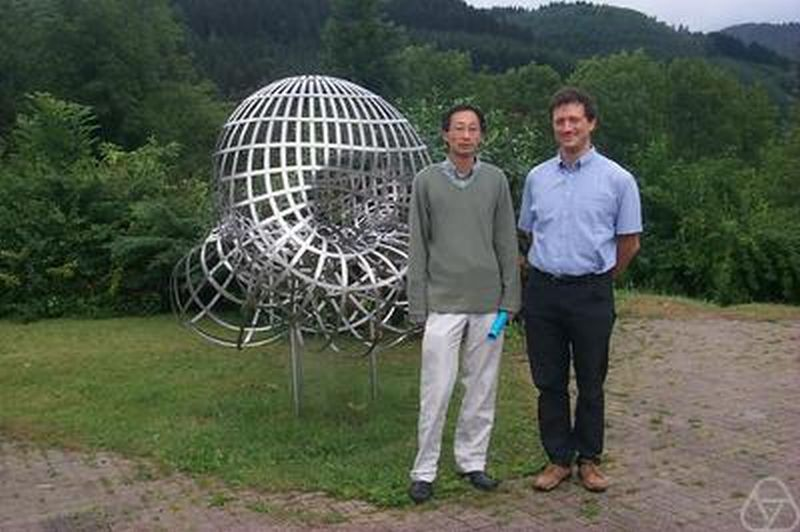
- Alberto Cattaneo (right) with Ping Xu, Oberwolfach 2003
- Born: 26 June 1967 (age 59); Milan
- Education: Università degli Studi di Milano
- Scientific career
- Fields: Mathematical Physics
- Workplaces: University of Zurich
- Thesis: Teorie topologiche di tipo BF ed invarianti dei nodi (1995)
- Doctoral advisor: Maurizio Martellini
- Doctoral students: Thomas Willwacher
- Website: https://www.math.uzh.ch/cattaneo/

Alberto Sergio Cattaneo (26 June 1967 in Milan) is an Italian mathematician and mathematical physicist, specializing in geometry related to quantum field theory and string theory.

== Biography ==
After attending Liceo scientifico A. Volta in Milan, Cattaneo studied physics at University of Milan, graduating in 1991. In 1995, he obtained a PhD in theoretical physics at the same university; his thesis, entitled Teorie topologiche di tipo BF ed invarianti dei nodi (Topological BF theories and knot invariants), was supervised by Maurizio Martellini.

Cattaneo worked as a postdoc in 1995-1997 at Harvard University (with Arthur Jaffe) and in 1997-1998 at the University of Milan (with Paolo Cotta-Ramusino). In 1998, he moved to University of Zurich's mathematics department as an assistant professor, and he became a full professor in 2003.

In 2006 he was an invited speaker, with the talk From topological field theory to deformation quantization and reduction, at the International Congress of Mathematicians in Madrid. Cattaneo was elected a Fellow of the American Mathematical Society in 2013.

== Research ==
Cattaneo's research interests include deformation quantization, symplectic and Poisson geometry, topological quantum field theories, and the mathematical aspects of perturbative quantization of gauge theories.

With Giovanni Felder he developed a path integral interpretation of the deformation quantization of Poisson manifolds (introduced in 2003 by Maxim Kontsevich), as well as a description of the symplectic groupoid integrating a Poisson manifold as an infinite-dimensional symplectic quotient.

He supervised 14 PhD students as of 2022.

== Selected publications ==
=== Articles ===
- Cattaneo, Alberto S.; Cotta-Ramusino, Paolo; Fröhlich, Jürg; Martellini, Maurizio (1995). "Topological BF theories in 3 and 4 dimensions". Journal of Mathematical Physics. 36 (11): 6137–6160. arXiv:hep-th/9505027. Bibcode:1995JMP....36.6137C. doi:10.1063/1.531238. S2CID 166350.
- Cattaneo, Alberto S.; Felder, Giovanni; Tomassini, Lorenzo (2002). "From local to global deformation quantization of Poisson manifolds". Duke Mathematical Journal. 115 (2). arXiv:math/0012228. doi:10.1215/S0012-7094-02-11524-5. S2CID 10201285.
- Cattaneo, A. S.; Indelicato, D. (2005). Formality and star products. Vol. 323. pp. 79–144. arXiv:math/0403135. doi:10.5167/uzh-21691. ISBN 9780521615051. S2CID 17250747.
- Cattaneo, Alberto S.; Felder, Giovanni (2007). "Relative formality theorem and quantisation of coisotropic submanifolds". Advances in Mathematics. 208 (2): 521–548. arXiv:math/0501540. doi:10.1016/j.aim.2006.03.010. S2CID 10469717.
- Cattaneo, A. S. (2008). "Deformation quantization and reduction". Cont. Math. 450: 79–101. arXiv:math/0701378. doi:10.5167/uzh-6703. S2CID 218971990.
- Cattaneo, Alberto S.; Dherin, Benoit; Weinstein, Alan (2010). "Symplectic microgeometry I: Micromorphisms". Journal of Symplectic Geometry. 8 (2): 205–223. arXiv:0905.3574. doi:10.4310/JSG.2010.v8.n2.a4. S2CID 50308861.
- Cattaneo, Alberto S.; Dherin, Benoît; Weinstein, Alan (2011). "Symplectic microgeometry II: Generating functions". Bulletin of the Brazilian Mathematical Society. New Series. 42 (4): 507–536. arXiv:1103.0672. doi:10.1007/s00574-011-0027-2. S2CID 44023383.
- Landsman, N. P.; Pflaum, Markus; Schlichenmaier, Martin (2012). "Poisson sigma models and symplectic groupoids by A. Cattaneo and G. Felder". Quantization of Singular Symplectic Quotients, eds. Landsman, Pflaum, & Schlichenmaier. Birkhäuser. pp. 61–94. ISBN 978-3-0348-8364-1.
- Cattaneo, Alberto S.; Mnev, Pavel; Reshetikhin, Nicolai (2012). "Classical and Quantum Lagrangian Field Theories with Boundary". Proceedings of Proceedings of the Corfu Summer Institute 2011 — PoS(CORFU2011). p. 044. arXiv:1207.0239. doi:10.22323/1.155.0044.
- Cattaneo, Alberto S.; Dherin, Benoit; Weinstein, Alan (2013). "Symplectic microgeometry III: Monoids". Journal of Symplectic Geometry. 11 (3): 319–341. arXiv:1109.4789. doi:10.4310/JSG.2013.v11.n3.a1. S2CID 50637248.
- Cattaneo, Alberto S.; Mnev, Pavel; Reshetikhin, Nicolai (2016). "Perturbative BV theories with Segal-like gluing". arXiv:1602.00741 [math-ph].
- Cattaneo, Alberto S.; Schiavina, Michele (2017). "On Time". Letters in Mathematical Physics. 107 (2): 375–408. arXiv:1607.02412. Bibcode:2017LMaPh.107..375C. doi:10.1007/s11005-016-0907-x. S2CID 119145820.
- Cattaneo, Alberto S.; Mnev, Pavel; Reshetikhin, Nicolai (2018). "Perturbative Quantum Gauge Theories on Manifolds with Boundary". Communications in Mathematical Physics. 357 (2): 631–730. arXiv:1507.01221. Bibcode:2018CMaPh.357..631C. doi:10.1007/s00220-017-3031-6. hdl:21.11116/0000-0004-0613-0. S2CID 119640108.
- Cattaneo, Alberto S.; Moshayedi, Nima; Wernli, Konstantin (2019). "Globalization for Perturbative Quantization of Nonlinear Split AKSZ Sigma Models on Manifolds with Boundary". Communications in Mathematical Physics. 372 (1): 213–260. arXiv:1807.11782. Bibcode:2019CMaPh.372..213C. doi:10.1007/s00220-019-03591-5. S2CID 119605584.
- Cattaneo, Alberto S.; Dherin, Benoit; Weinstein, Alan (2021). "Symplectic microgeometry, IV: Quantization". Pacific Journal of Mathematics. 312 (2): 355–399. arXiv:2007.08167. doi:10.2140/pjm.2021.312.355. S2CID 220546201.

=== Books ===
- with Alain Bruguières, Bernhard Keller, Charles Torossian: Déformation, quantification, théorie de Lie. Panoramas et Synthèse, tome 20. Société Mathématique de France. 2005. ISBN 978-2-85629-183-2.

=== as editor ===
- Cattaneo, Alberto S.; Giaquinto, Anthony; Xu, Ping, eds. (25 November 2010). Higher Structures in Geometry and Physics: In Honor of Murray Gerstenhaber and Jim Stasheff. Springer. ISBN 9780817647353.
