= Associative bialgebroid =

In mathematics, an associative bialgebroid generalizes the concept of a bialgebra over a field to allow a possibly noncommutative base algebra instead of a field. If $L$ is an associative algebra over some ground field k, then a left associative $L$-bialgebroid is another associative k-algebra $H$ together with the following additional maps: an algebra map $\alpha:L\to H$ called the source map, an algebra map $\beta:L^{\mathrm{op}}\to H$ called the target map, so that the elements of the images of $\alpha$ and $\beta$ commute in $H$, therefore inducing an $L$-bimodule structure on $H$ via the rule $a.h.b = \alpha(a)\beta(b) h$ for $a,b\in L, h\in H$; an $L$-bimodule morphism $\Delta:H\to H\otimes_L H$ which is required to be a counital coassociative comultiplication on $H$ in the monoidal category of $L$-bimodules with monoidal product $\otimes_L$.

The corresponding counit $\varepsilon:H\to L$ is required to be a left character (equivalently, the map $H\otimes L\ni h\otimes \ell\mapsto \varepsilon(h\alpha(\ell))\in L$ must be a left action extending the multiplication $L\otimes L\to L$ along $\alpha\otimes\mathrm{id}_L$).

Furthermore, a compatibility between the comultiplication $\Delta$ and multiplications on $H$ and on $H\otimes H$ is required. For a noncommutative $L$, the tensor square $H\otimes_L H$ is not an algebra, hence asking for a bialgebra-like compatibility that $\Delta:H\to H\otimes_L H$ is a morphism of k-algebras does not make sense. Instead, one requires that $H\otimes_L H$ has a k-subspace $T$ which contains the image of $\Delta$ and has a well-defined multiplication induced from its preimage under the projection from the usual tensor square algebra $H\otimes H$. Then one requires that the corestriction $\Delta|^T :H\to T$ is a homomorphism of unital algebras. If it is a homomorphism for one such $T$, one can make a canonical choice for $T$, namely the so called Takeuchi's product $H\times_L H\subset H\otimes_L H$, which always inherits an associative multiplication via the projection from $H\otimes H$. Thus, it is sufficient to check if the image of $\Delta$ is contained in the Takeuchi's product rather than to look for other $T$. As shown by Brzeziński and Militaru, the notion of a bialgebroid is equivalent to the notion of $\times_L$-algebra introduced by Takeuchi earlier, in 1977.

Associative bialgebroid is a generalization of a notion of k-bialgebra where a commutative ground ring k is replaced by a possibly noncommutative k-algebra $L$. Hopf algebroids are associative bialgebroids with an additional antipode map which is an antiautomorphism of $H$ satisfying additional axioms.

The term bialgebroid for this notion has been first proposed by J-H. Lu. The modifier associative is often dropped from the name, and retained mainly only when we want to distinguish it from the notion of a Lie bialgebroid, often also referred just as a bialgebroid. Associative bialgebroids come in two chiral versions, left and right. A dual notion is the notion of a bicoalgebroid.

There is a generalization, an internal bialgebroid which abstracts the structure of an associative bialgebroid to the setup where the category of vector spaces is replaced by an abstract symmetric monoidal category admitting coequalizers commuting with the tensor product.
