= Dendroidal set =

In mathematics, a dendroidal set is a generalization of simplicial sets introduced by Moerdijk & Weiss (2007). They have the same relation to (colored symmetric) operads, also called symmetric multicategories, that simplicial sets have to categories.

== Definition ==
A dendroidal set is a contravariant functor from Ω to sets, where Ω is the tree category consisting of finite rooted trees considered as operads, whose morphisms are operad morphisms. The trees are allowed to have some edges with a vertex on only one side; these are called outer edges, and the root is one of the outer edges.
