= Internal bialgebroid =

Mathematical structure

In mathematics, an internal bialgebroid is a structure which generalizes the notion of an associative bialgebroid to the setup where the ambient symmetric monoidal category of vector spaces is replaced by any abstract symmetric monoidal category (C, $\otimes$, I,s) admitting coequalizers commuting with the monoidal product $\otimes$. It consists of two monoids in the monoidal category (C, $\otimes$, I), namely the base monoid $A$ and the total monoid $H$, and several structure morphisms involving $A$ and $H$ as first axiomatized by G. Böhm. The coequalizers are needed to introduce the tensor product $\otimes_A$ of (internal) bimodules over the base monoid; this tensor product is consequently (a part of) a monoidal structure on the category of $A$-bimodules. In the axiomatics, $H$ appears to be an $A$-bimodule in a specific way. One of the structure maps is the comultiplication $\Delta:H\to H\otimes_A H$ which is an $A$-bimodule morphism and induces an internal $A$-coring structure on $H$. One further requires (rather involved) compatibility requirements between the comultiplication $\Delta$ and the monoid structures on $H$ and $H\otimes H$.

Some important examples are analogues of associative bialgebroids in the situations involving completed tensor products.

== See also ==
- Bialgebra
