= Differential invariant =

In mathematics, a differential invariant is an invariant for the action of a Lie group on a space that involves the derivatives of graphs of functions in the space. Differential invariants are fundamental in projective differential geometry, and the curvature is often studied from this point of view. Differential invariants were introduced in special cases by Sophus Lie in the early 1880s and studied by Georges Henri Halphen at the same time. Lie (1884) was the first general work on differential invariants, and established the relationship between differential invariants, invariant differential equations, and invariant differential operators.

Differential invariants are contrasted with geometric invariants. Whereas differential invariants can involve a distinguished choice of independent variables (or a parameterization), geometric invariants do not. The moving frames method, which is a refinement of Élie Cartan's method of moving frames, gives several new powerful tools for finding and classifying the equivalence and symmetry properties of submanifolds, differential invariants, and their syzygies. Although, the moving frames method is less general than Lie's methods of differential invariants, it always yields invariants of the geometrical kind.

== Definition ==
The simplest case is for differential invariants for one independent variable x and one dependent variable y. Let G be a Lie group acting on R^{2}. Then G also acts, locally, on the space of all graphs of the form y = ƒ(x). Roughly speaking, a k-th order differential invariant is a function

$$I\left(x,y,\frac{dy}{dx},\dots,\frac{d^ky}{dx^k}\right)$$

depending on y and its first k derivatives with respect to x, that is invariant under the action of the group.

The group can act on the higher-order derivatives in a nontrivial manner that requires computing the prolongation of the group action. The action of G on the first derivative, for instance, is such that the chain rule continues to hold: if

$$(\overline{x},\overline{y}) = g\cdot(x,y),$$

then

$$g\cdot\left(x,y,\frac{dy}{dx}\right) \stackrel{\text{def}}{=} \left(\overline{x},\overline{y},\frac{d\overline{y}}{d\overline{x}}\right).$$

Similar considerations apply for the computation of higher prolongations. This method of computing the prolongation is impractical, however, and it is much simpler to work infinitesimally at the level of Lie algebras and the Lie derivative along the G action.

More generally, differential invariants can be considered for mappings from any smooth manifold X into another smooth manifold Y for a Lie group acting on the Cartesian product X×Y. The graph of a mapping X → Y is a submanifold of X×Y that is everywhere transverse to the fibers over X. The group G acts, locally, on the space of such graphs, and induces an action on the k-th prolongation Y^{(k)} consisting of graphs passing through each point modulo the relation of k-th order contact. A differential invariant is a function on Y^{(k)} that is invariant under the prolongation of the group action.

== Applications ==
- Solving equivalence problems
- Differential invariants can be applied to the study of systems of partial differential equations: seeking similarity solutions that are invariant under the action of a particular group can reduce the dimension of the problem (i.e. yield a "reduced system").
- Noether's theorem implies the existence of differential invariants corresponding to every differentiable symmetry of a variational problem.
- Flow characteristics using computer vision
- Geometric integration

== See also ==
- Cartan's equivalence method
