= Lie algebroid =

Infinitesimal version of Lie groupoid

In mathematics, a Lie algebroid is a vector bundle $A \rightarrow M$ together with a Lie bracket on its space of sections $\Gamma(A)$ and a vector bundle morphism $\rho: A \rightarrow TM$, satisfying a Leibniz rule. A Lie algebroid can thus be thought of as a "many-object generalisation" of a Lie algebra.

Lie algebroids play a similar same role in the theory of Lie groupoids that Lie algebras play in the theory of Lie groups: reducing global problems to infinitesimal ones. Indeed, any Lie groupoid gives rise to a Lie algebroid, which is the vertical bundle of the source map restricted at the units. However, unlike Lie algebras, not every Lie algebroid arises from a Lie groupoid.

Lie algebroids were introduced in 1967 by Jean Pradines.

== Definition and basic concepts ==
A Lie algebroid is a triple $(A, [\cdot,\cdot], \rho)$ consisting of

- a vector bundle $A$ over a manifold $M$
- a Lie bracket $[\cdot,\cdot]$ on its space of sections $\Gamma (A)$
- a morphism of vector bundles $\rho: A\rightarrow TM$, called the anchor, where $TM$ is the tangent bundle of $M$

such that the anchor and the bracket satisfy the following Leibniz rule:

$$[X,fY]=\rho(X)f\cdot Y + f[X,Y]$$

where $X,Y \in \Gamma(A), f\in C^\infty(M)$. Here $\rho(X)f$ is the image of $f$ via the derivation $\rho(X)$, i.e. the Lie derivative of $f$ along the vector field $\rho(X)$. The notation $\rho(X)f \cdot Y$ denotes the (point-wise) product between the function $\rho(X)f$ and the vector field $Y$.

One often writes $A \to M$ when the bracket and the anchor are clear from the context; some authors denote Lie algebroids by $A \Rightarrow M$, suggesting a "limit" of a Lie groupoids when the arrows denoting source and target become "infinitesimally close".

=== First properties ===
It follows from the definition that

- for every $x \in M$, the kernel $\mathfrak{g}_x(A)=\ker(\rho_x)$ is a Lie algebra, called the isotropy Lie algebra at $x$
- the kernel $\mathfrak{g}(A)=\ker(\rho)$ is a (not necessarily locally trivial) bundle of Lie algebras, called the isotropy Lie algebra bundle
- the image $\mathrm{Im}(\rho) \subseteq TM$ is a singular distribution which is integrable, i.e. its admits maximal immersed submanifolds $\mathcal O \subseteq M$, called the orbits, satisfying $\mathrm{Im}(\rho_x) = T_x \mathcal{O}$ for every $x \in \mathcal O$. Equivalently, orbits can be explicitly described as the sets of points which are joined by A-paths, i.e. pairs $(a: I \to A, \gamma: I \to M)$ of paths in $A$ and in $M$ such that $a(t) \in A_{\gamma(t)}$ and $\rho (a(t)) = \gamma'(t)$
- the anchor map $\rho$ descends to a map between sections $\rho: \Gamma(A) \rightarrow \mathfrak{X}(M)$ which is a Lie algebra morphism, i.e.

$$\rho([X,Y])=[\rho(X),\rho(Y)]$$

for all $X,Y \in \Gamma(A)$.

The property that $\rho$ induces a Lie algebra morphism was taken as an axiom in the original definition of Lie algebroid. Such redundancy, despite being known from an algebraic point of view already before Pradine's definition, was noticed only much later.

=== Subalgebroids and ideals ===
A Lie subalgebroid of a Lie algebroid $(A, [\cdot,\cdot], \rho)$ is a vector subbundle $A'\to M'$ of the restriction $A_{\mid M'} \to M'$ such that $\rho_{\mid A'}$ takes values in $TM'$ and $\Gamma(A,A'):= \{ \alpha \in \Gamma(A) \mid \alpha_{\mid M'} \in \Gamma(A') \}$ is a Lie subalgebra of $\Gamma(A)$. Clearly, $A'\to M'$ admits a unique Lie algebroid structure such that $\Gamma(A,A') \to \Gamma(A')$ is a Lie algebra morphism. With the language introduced below, the inclusion $A' \hookrightarrow A$ is a Lie algebroid morphism.

A Lie subalgebroid is called wide if $M' = M$. In analogy to the standard definition for Lie algebra, an ideal of a Lie algebroid is wide Lie subalgebroid $I \subseteq A$ such that $\Gamma(I) \subseteq \Gamma(A)$ is a Lie ideal. Such notion proved to be very restrictive, since $I$ is forced to be inside the isotropy bundle $\ker(\rho)$. For this reason, the more flexible notion of infinitesimal ideal system has been introduced.

=== Morphisms ===
A Lie algebroid morphism between two Lie algebroids $(A_1, [\cdot,\cdot]_{A_1}, \rho_1)$ and $(A_2, [\cdot,\cdot]_{A_2}, \rho_2)$ with the same base $M$ is a vector bundle morphism $\phi: A_1 \to A_2$ which is compatible with the Lie brackets, i.e. $\phi ([\alpha,\beta]_{A_1}) = [\phi(\alpha),\phi(\beta)]_{A_2}$ for every $\alpha,\beta \in \Gamma(A_1)$, and with the anchors, i.e. $\rho_2 \circ \phi = \rho_1$.

A similar notion can be formulated for morphisms with different bases, but the compatibility with the Lie brackets becomes more involved. Equivalently, one can ask that the graph of $\phi: A_1 \to A_2$ to be a subalgebroid of the direct product $A_1 \times A_2$ (introduced below).

Lie algebroids together with their morphisms form a category.

== Examples ==
=== Trivial and extreme cases ===
- Given any manifold $M$, its tangent Lie algebroid is the tangent bundle $TM \to M$ together with the Lie bracket of vector fields and the identity of $TM$ as an anchor.
- Given any manifold $M$, the zero vector bundle $M \times 0 \to M$ is a Lie algebroid with zero bracket and anchor.
- Lie algebroids $A \to \{*\}$ over a point are the same thing as Lie algebras.
- More generally, any bundles of Lie algebras is Lie algebroid with zero anchor and Lie bracket defined pointwise.

=== Examples from differential geometry ===
- Given a foliation $\mathcal{F}$ on $M$, its foliation algebroid is the associated involutive subbundle $\mathcal{F} \subseteq TM$, with brackets and anchor induced from the tangent Lie algebroid.
- Given the action of a Lie algebra $\mathfrak{g}$ on a manifold $M$, its action algebroid is the trivial vector bundle $\mathfrak{g} \times M \to M$, with anchor given by the Lie algebra action and brackets uniquely determined by the bracket of $\mathfrak{g}$ on constant sections $M \to \mathfrak{g}$ and by the Leibniz identity.
- Given a principal G-bundle $P$ over a manifold $M$, its Atiyah algebroid is the Lie algebroid $A = TP/G$ fitting in the following short exact sequence:
  $$0 \to \ker(\rho) \to TP/G\xrightarrow{\rho} TM \to 0.$$

The space of sections of the Atiyah algebroid is the Lie algebra of $G$-invariant vector fields on $P$, its isotropy Lie algebra bundle is isomorphic to the adjoint vector bundle $P\times_G \mathfrak g$, and the right splittings of the sequence above are principal connections on $P$.

- Given a vector bundle $E \to M$, its general linear algebroid, denoted by $\mathfrak{gl}(E)$ or $\mathrm{Der}(E)$, is the vector bundle whose sections are derivations of $E$, i.e. first-order differential operators $\Gamma(E) \to \Gamma(E)$ admitting a vector field $\rho(D) \in \mathfrak{X}(M)$ such that $D(f \sigma) = f D(\sigma) + \rho(D)(f) \sigma$ for every $f \in \mathcal{C}^{\infty}(M), \sigma \in \Gamma(E)$. The anchor is simply the assignment $D \mapsto \rho(D)$ and the Lie bracket is given by the commutator of differential operators.
- Given a Poisson manifold $(M,\pi)$, its cotangent algebroid is the cotangent vector bundle $A = T^*M$, with Lie bracket $[\alpha,\beta]:= \mathcal{L}_{\pi^\sharp (\alpha)} (\beta) - \mathcal{L}_{\pi^\sharp (\beta)} (\alpha) - d \pi( \alpha, \beta)$ and anchor map $\pi^\sharp: T^*M \to TM, \alpha \mapsto \pi(\alpha,\cdot)$.
- Given a closed 2-form $\omega \in \Omega^2(M)$, the vector bundle $A_\omega := TM \times \mathbb{R} \to M$ is a Lie algebroid with anchor the projection on the first component and Lie bracket
  $$[(X,f), (Y,g)]:= \Big( [X,Y], \mathcal{L}_X(g) - \mathcal{L}_Y(f) - \omega(X,Y) \Big).$$
  Actually, the bracket above can be defined for any 2-form $\omega$, but $A_\omega$ is a Lie algebroid if and only if $\omega$ is closed.

=== Constructions from other Lie algebroids ===
- Given any Lie algebroid $(A \to M,[\cdot,\cdot],\rho)$, there is a Lie algebroid $(TA \to TM,[\cdot,\cdot],\rho)$, called its tangent algebroid, obtained by considering the tangent bundle of $A$ and $M$ and the differential of the anchor.
- Given any Lie algebroid $(A \to M,[\cdot,\cdot]_A,\rho_A)$, there is a Lie algebroid $(J^k A \to M,[\cdot,\cdot],\rho)$, called its k-jet algebroid, obtained by considering the k-jet bundle of $A \to M$, with Lie bracket uniquely defined by $[j^k \alpha,j^k\beta] := j^k [\alpha,\beta]_A$ and anchor $\rho(j^k_x\alpha):= \rho_A(\alpha(x) )$.
- Given two Lie algebroids $A_1 \to M_1$ and $A_2 \to M_2$, their direct product is the unique Lie algebroid $A_1 \times A_2 \to M_1 \times M_2$ with anchor $(\alpha_1, \alpha_2) \mapsto \rho_1(\alpha_1) \oplus \rho_2 (\alpha_2) \in TM_1 \oplus TM_2 \cong T(M_1 \times M_2),$ and such that $\Gamma(A_1) \oplus \Gamma(A_2) \to \Gamma(A_1 \times A_2), \alpha_1 \oplus \alpha_2 \mapsto \mathrm{pr}_{M_1}^*\alpha_1 + \mathrm{pr}_{M_2}^*\alpha_2$ is a Lie algebra morphism.
- Given a Lie algebroid $(A \to M,[\cdot,\cdot]_A,\rho_A)$ and a map $f: M' \to M$ whose differential is transverse to the anchor map $\rho: A \to TM$ (for instance, it is enough for $f$ to be a surjective submersion), the pullback algebroid is the unique Lie algebroid $f^!A \to M'$, with $f^!A:=TM' \times_{TM} A \to M'$ the pullback vector bundle, and $\rho_{f^!A}: f^!A \to TM'$ the projection on the first component, such that $f^!A \to A$ is a Lie algebroid morphism.

== Important classes of Lie algebroids ==
=== Totally intransitive Lie algebroids ===
A Lie algebroid is called totally intransitive if the anchor map $\rho: A \to TM$ is zero.

Bundle of Lie algebras (hence also Lie algebras) are totally intransitive. This actually exhaust completely the list of totally intransitive Lie algebroids: indeed, if $A$ is totally intransitive, it must coincide with its isotropy Lie algebra bundle.

=== Transitive Lie algebroids ===
A Lie algebroid is called transitive if the anchor map $\rho: A \to TM$ is surjective. As a consequence:

- there is a short exact sequence
  $$0 \to \ker(\rho) \to A \xrightarrow{\rho} TM \to 0;$$
- right-splitting of $\rho$ defines a principal bundle connections on $\ker(\rho)$;
- the isotropy bundle $\ker(\rho)$ is locally trivial (as bundle of Lie algebras);
- the pullback of $A$ exist for every $f: M' \to M$.

The prototypical examples of transitive Lie algebroids are Atiyah algebroids. For instance:

- tangent algebroids $TM$ are trivially transitive (indeed, they are Atiyah algebroid of the principal $\{e\}$-bundle $M \to M$)
- Lie algebras $\mathfrak{g}$ are trivially transitive (indeed, they are Atiyah algebroid of the principal $G$-bundle $G \to *$, for $G$ an integration of $\mathfrak{g}$)
- general linear algebroids $\mathfrak{gl}(E)$ are transitive (indeed, they are Atiyah algebroids of the frame bundle $Fr(E)\to M$)

In analogy to Atiyah algebroids, an arbitrary transitive Lie algebroid is also called abstract Atiyah sequence, and its isotropy algebra bundle $\ker(\rho)$ is also called adjoint bundle. However, it is important to stress that not every transitive Lie algebroid is an Atiyah algebroid. For instance:

- pullbacks of transitive algebroids are transitive
- cotangent algebroids $T^*M$ associated to Poisson manifolds $(M,\pi)$ are transitive if and only if the Poisson structure $\pi$ is non-degenerate
- Lie algebroids $A_\omega$ defined by closed 2-forms are transitive

These examples are very relevant in the theory of integration of Lie algebroid (see below): while any Atiyah algebroid is integrable (to a gauge groupoid), not every transitive Lie algebroid is integrable.

=== Regular Lie algebroids ===
A Lie algebroid is called regular if the anchor map $\rho: A \to TM$ is of constant rank. As a consequence

- the image of $\rho$ defines a regular foliation on $M$;
- the restriction of $A$ over each leaf $\mathcal{O} \subseteq M$ is a transitive Lie algebroid.

For instance:

- any transitive Lie algebroid is regular (the anchor has maximal rank);
- any totally intransitive Lie algebroids is regular (the anchor has zero rank);
- foliation algebroids are always regular;
- cotangent algebroids $T^*M$ associated to Poisson manifolds $(M,\pi)$ are regular if and only if the Poisson structure $\pi$ is regular.

== Further related concepts ==
=== Actions ===
An action of a Lie algebroid $A \to M$ on a manifold P along a smooth map $\mu: P \to M$ consists of a Lie algebra morphism
$$a: \Gamma(A) \to \mathfrak{X}(P)$$
such that, for every $p \in P, X \in \Gamma(A), f \in \mathcal{C}^\infty(M)$,
$$d_p\mu (a(X)_p) = \rho_{\mu(p)} (X_{\mu(p)}), \quad a(f \cdot X) = (f \circ \mu) \cdot a(X).$$
Of course, when $A=\mathfrak{g}$, both the anchor $A \to \{*\}$ and the map $P \to \{*\}$ must be trivial, therefore both conditions are empty, and we recover the standard notion of action of a Lie algebra on a manifold.

=== Connections ===
Given a Lie algebroid $A \to M$, an A-connection on a vector bundle $E \to M$ consists of an $\mathbb{R}$-bilinear map
$$\nabla: \Gamma(A) \times \Gamma(E) \to \Gamma(E), \quad (\alpha,s) \mapsto \nabla_\alpha (s)$$
which is $\mathcal{C}^\infty(M)$-linear in the first factor and satisfies the following Leibniz rule:
$$\nabla_\alpha (fs) = f \nabla_\alpha (s) + \mathcal{L}_{\rho(\alpha)} (f) s$$
for every $\alpha \in \Gamma(A), s \in \Gamma(E), f \in \mathcal{C}^{\infty}(M)$, where $\mathcal{L}_{\rho(\alpha)}$ denotes the Lie derivative with respect to the vector field $\rho(\alpha)$.

The curvature of an A-connection $\nabla$ is the $\mathcal{C}^\infty(M)$-bilinear map
$$R_\nabla: \Gamma(A) \times \Gamma(A) \to \mathrm{Hom}(E,E), \quad (\alpha, \beta) \mapsto \nabla_\alpha \nabla_\beta - \nabla_\beta \nabla_\alpha  - \nabla_{[\alpha,\beta]},$$
and $\nabla$ is called flat if $R_\nabla = 0$.

Of course, when $A=TM$, we recover the standard notion of connection on a vector bundle, as well as those of curvature and flatness.

=== Representations ===
A representation of a Lie algebroid $A \to M$ is a vector bundle $E \to M$ together with a flat A-connection $\nabla$. Equivalently, a representation $(E, \nabla)$ is a Lie algebroid morphism $A \to \mathfrak{gl}(E)$.

The set $\mathrm{Rep}(A)$ of isomorphism classes of representations of a Lie algebroid $A \to M$ has a natural structure of semiring, with direct sums and tensor products of vector bundles.

Examples include the following:

- When $A=\mathfrak{g}$, an $A$-connection simplifies to a linear map $\mathfrak{g} \to \mathfrak{gl}(V)$ and the flatness condition makes it into a Lie algebra morphism, therefore we recover the standard notion of representation of a Lie algebra.
- When $A = \mathfrak{g} \times M \to M$ and $V$ is a representation the Lie algebra $\mathfrak{g}$, the trivial vector bundle $V \times M \to M$ is automatically a representation of $A$
- Representations of the tangent algebroid $A =TM$ are vector bundles endowed with flat connections
- Every Lie algebroid $A \to M$ has a natural representation on the line bundle $Q_A := \wedge^{top} A \otimes \wedge^{top} T^*M \to M$, i.e. the tensor product between the determinant line bundles of $A$ and of $T^*M$. One can associate a cohomology class in $H^1(A, Q_A)$ (see below) known as the modular class of the Lie algebroid. For the cotangent algebroid $T^*M \to M$ associated to a Poisson manifold $(M,\pi)$ one recovers the modular class of $\pi$.

Note that there an arbitrary Lie groupoid does not have a canonical representation on its Lie algebroid, playing the role of the adjoint representation of Lie groups on their Lie algebras. However, this becomes possible if one allows the more general notion of representation up to homotopy.

=== Lie algebroid cohomology ===
Consider a Lie algebroid $A \to M$ and a representation $(E, \nabla)$. Denoting by $\Omega^n(A,E) := \Gamma(\wedge^n A^* \otimes E)$ the space of $n$-differential forms on $A$ with values in the vector bundle $E$, one can define a differential $d^n: \Omega^n(A,E) \to \Omega^{n+1}(A,E)$ with the following Koszul-like formula:
$$d \omega(\alpha_0,\ldots,\alpha_n) := \sum_{i=1}^n (-1)^i \nabla_{\alpha_i} \big( \omega (\alpha_0, \ldots, \widehat{\alpha_i}, \ldots, \alpha_n) \big) - \sum_{i<j}^n (-1)^{i+j+1} \omega ([\alpha_i,\alpha_j],\alpha_0,\ldots,\widehat{\alpha_i},\ldots,\widehat{\alpha_j},\ldots,\alpha_n)$$
Thanks to the flatness of $\nabla$, $(\Omega^n(A,E),d^n)$ becomes a cochain complex and its cohomology, denoted by $H^*(A,E)$, is called the Lie algebroid cohomology of $A$ with coefficients in the representation $(E, \nabla)$.

This general definition recovers well-known cohomology theories:

- The cohomology of a Lie algebroid $\mathfrak{g} \to \{*\}$ coincides with the Chevalley-Eilenberg cohomology of $\mathfrak{g}$ as a Lie algebra.
- The cohomology of a tangent Lie algebroid $TM \to M$ coincides with the de Rham cohomology of $M$.
- The cohomology of a foliation Lie algebroid $\mathcal{F} \to M$ coincides with the leafwise cohomology of the foliation $\mathcal{F}$.
- The cohomology of the cotangent Lie algebroid $T^*M$ associated to a Poisson structure $\pi$ coincides with the Poisson cohomology of $\pi$.

== Lie groupoid-Lie algebroid correspondence ==
The standard construction which associates a Lie algebra to a Lie group generalises to this setting: to every Lie groupoid $G \rightrightarrows M$ one can canonically associate a Lie algebroid $\mathrm{Lie}(G)$ defined as follows:

- the vector bundle is $\mathrm{Lie}(G) = A:=u^*T^sG$, where $T^s G \subseteq TG$ is the vertical bundle of the source fibre $s: G \to M$ and $u: M \to G$ is the groupoid unit map;
- the sections of $A$ are identified with the right-invariant vector fields on $G$, so that $\Gamma(A)$ inherits a Lie bracket;
- the anchor map is the differential $\rho := dt_{\mid A}: A \to TM$ of the target map $t: G \to M$.

Of course, a symmetric construction arises when swapping the role of the source and the target maps, and replacing right- with left-invariant vector fields; an isomorphism between the two resulting Lie algebroids will be given by the differential of the inverse map $i:G\to G$.

The flow of a section $\alpha \in \Gamma(A)$ is the 1-parameter bisection $\phi^\epsilon_\alpha \in \mathrm{Bis}(G)$, defined by $\phi^\epsilon_\alpha(x):= \phi^\epsilon_{\tilde{\alpha}}(1_x)$, where $\phi^\epsilon_{\tilde{\alpha}} \in \mathrm{Diff}(G)$ is the flow of the corresponding right-invariant vector field $\tilde{\alpha} \in \mathfrak{X}(G)$. This allows one to defined the analogue of the exponential map for Lie groups as $\exp: \Gamma(A) \to \mathrm{Bis}(G), \exp(\alpha)(x):= \phi^1_\alpha(x)$.

=== Lie functor ===
The mapping $G \mapsto \mathrm{Lie}(G)$ sending a Lie groupoid to a Lie algebroid is actually part of a categorical construction. Indeed, any Lie groupoid morphism $\phi: G_1 \to G_2$ can be differentiated to a morphism $d\phi_{\mid \mathrm{Lie}(G_1)}: \mathrm{Lie}(G_1) \to \mathrm{Lie}(G_2)$ between the associated Lie algebroids.

This construction defines a functor from the category of Lie groupoids and their morphisms to the category of Lie algebroids and their morphisms, called the Lie functor.

=== Structures and properties induced from groupoids to algebroids ===
Let $G\rightrightarrows M$ be a Lie groupoid and $(A \to M, [\cdot,\cdot],\rho)$ its associated Lie algebroid. Then

- The isotropy algebras $\mathfrak{g}_x(A)$ are the Lie algebras of the isotropy groups $G_x$
- The orbits of $G$ coincides with the orbits of $A$
- $G$ is transitive and $(s,t): G \to M \times M$ is a submersion if and only if $A$ is transitive
- an action $m: G \times_M P \to P$ of $G$ on $P \to M$ induces an action $a: \Gamma(A) \to \mathfrak{X}(P)$ of $A$ (called infinitesimal action), defined by
  $$a(\alpha)_p := d_{1_{\mu(p)}} m (\cdot, p) (\alpha_{\mu(p)}) = d_{(1_{\mu(p)},p)} m (\alpha_{\mu(p)},0)$$
- a representation of $G$ on a vector bundle $E \to M$ induces a representation $\nabla$ of $A$ on $E \to M$, defined by
  $$\nabla_\alpha \sigma (x):= \frac{d}{d \epsilon}_{\mid \epsilon=0} \Big(\phi^\epsilon_\alpha(x) \Big)^{-1} \cdot \sigma \Big (t (\phi^\epsilon_\alpha(x) )\Big)$$
  Moreover, there is a morphism of semirings $\mathrm{Rep}(G) \to \mathrm{Rep}(A)$, which becomes an isomorphism if $G$ is source-simply connected.
- there is a morphism $VE^k: H_d^k(G,E) \to H^k(A,E)$, called Van Est morphism, from the differentiable cohomology of $G$ with coefficients in some representation on $E$ to the cohomology of $A$ with coefficients in the induced representation on $E$. Moreover, if the $s$-fibres of $G$ are homologically $n$-connected, then $VE^k$ is an isomorphism for $k \leq n$, and is injective for $k = n+1$.

=== Examples ===
- The Lie algebroid of a Lie group $G \rightrightarrows \{*\}$ is the Lie algebra $\mathfrak{g} \to \{*\}$
- The Lie algebroid of both the pair groupoid $M\times M \rightrightarrows M$ and the fundamental groupoid $\Pi_1(M) \rightrightarrows M$ is the tangent algebroid $TM \to M$
- The Lie algebroid of the unit groupoid $u(M) \rightrightarrows M$ is the zero algebroid $M \times 0 \to M$
- The Lie algebroid of a Lie group bundle $G \rightrightarrows M$ is the Lie algebra bundle $A \to M$
- The Lie algebroid of an action groupoid $G\times M \rightrightarrows M$ is the action algebroid $\mathfrak{g} \times M \to M$
- The Lie algebroid of a gauge groupoid $(P \times P)/G \rightrightarrows M$ is the Atiyah algebroid $TP/G \to M$
- The Lie algebroid of a general linear groupoid $GL(E) \rightrightarrows M$ is the general linear algebroid $\mathfrak{gl}(E) \to M$
- The Lie algebroid of both the holonomy groupoid $\mathrm{Hol}(\mathcal{F}) \rightrightarrows M$ and the monodromy groupoid $\Pi_1(\mathcal{F}) \rightrightarrows M$ is the foliation algebroid $\mathcal{F} \to M$
- The Lie algebroid of a tangent groupoid $TG \rightrightarrows TM$ is the tangent algebroid $TA \to TM$, for $A = \mathrm{Lie}(G)$
- The Lie algebroid of a jet groupoid $J^k G \rightrightarrows M$ is the jet algebroid $J^k A \to M$, for $A = \mathrm{Lie}(G)$

=== Detailed example 1 ===
Let us describe the Lie algebroid associated to the pair groupoid $G:=M\times M$. Since the source map is $s:G\to M: (p,q)\mapsto q$, the $s$-fibers are of the kind $M \times \{q\}$, so that the vertical space is $T^sG=\bigcup_{q\in M} TM \times \{q\} \subset TM\times TM$. Using the unit map $u:M\to G: q\mapsto (q,q)$, one obtain the vector bundle $A:=u^*T^sG=\bigcup_{q\in M} T_qM=TM$.

The extension of sections $X \in \Gamma(A)$ to right-invariant vector fields $\tilde{X} \in \mathfrak{X}(G)$ is simply $\tilde X(p,q)= X(p) \oplus 0$ and the extension of a smooth function $f$ from $M$ to a right-invariant function on $G$ is $\tilde f(p,q)=f(q)$. Therefore, the bracket on $A$ is just the Lie bracket of tangent vector fields and the anchor map is just the identity.

=== Detailed example 2 ===
Consider the (action) Lie groupoid

$$\mathbb{R}^2\times U(1) \rightrightarrows \mathbb{R}^2$$

where the target map (i.e. the right action of $U(1)$ on $\mathbb{R}^2$) is

$$((x,y), e^{i\theta}) \mapsto \begin{bmatrix}
\cos(\theta) & -\sin(\theta) \\
\sin(\theta) & \cos(\theta)
\end{bmatrix}
\begin{bmatrix}
x \\
y
\end{bmatrix}.$$

The $s$-fibre over a point $p = (x,y)$ are all copies of $U(1)$, so that $u^*(T^s(\mathbb{R}^2\times U(1)))$ is the trivial vector bundle $\mathbb{R}^2 \times U(1) \to \mathbb{R}^2$.

Since its anchor map $\rho: \mathbb{R}^2 \times U(1) \to T\mathbb{R}^2$ is given by the differential of the target map, there are two cases for the isotropy Lie algebras, corresponding to the fibers of $T^t(\mathbb{R}^2\times U(1))$:

$$\begin{align}
t^{-1}(0) \cong & U(1) \\
t^{-1}(p) \cong & \{ (a,u) \in \mathbb{R}^2\times U(1) : ua = p \}
\end{align}$$

This demonstrates that the isotropy over the origin is $U(1)$, while everywhere else is zero.

== Integration of a Lie algebroid ==
=== Lie theorems ===
A Lie algebroid is called integrable if it is isomorphic to $\mathrm{Lie}(G)$ for some Lie groupoid $G \rightrightarrows M$. The analogue of the classical Lie I theorem states that:

if $A$ is an integrable Lie algebroid, then there exists a unique (up to isomorphism) $s$-simply connected Lie groupoid $G$ integrating $A$.

Similarly, a morphism $F: A_1 \to A_2$ between integrable Lie algebroids is called integrable if it is the differential $F = d\phi_{ \mid A}$ for some morphism $\phi: G_1 \to G_2$ between two integrations of $A_1$ and $A_2$. The analogue of the classical Lie II theorem states that:

if $F: \mathrm{Lie}(G_1) \to \mathrm{Lie}(G_2)$ is a morphism of integrable Lie algebroids, and $G_1$ is $s$-simply connected, then there exists a unique morphism of Lie groupoids $\phi: G_1 \to G_2$ integrating $F$.

In particular, by choosing as $G_2$ the general linear groupoid $GL(E)$ of a vector bundle $E$, it follows that any representation of an integrable Lie algebroid integrates to a representation of its $s$-simply connected integrating Lie groupoid.

On the other hand, there is no analogue of the classical Lie III theorem, i.e. going back from any Lie algebroid to a Lie groupoid is not always possible. Pradines claimed that such a statement hold, and the first explicit example of non-integrable Lie algebroids, coming for instance from foliation theory, appeared only several years later. Despite several partial results, including a complete solution in the transitive case, the general obstructions for an arbitrary Lie algebroid to be integrable have been discovered only in 2003 by Crainic and Fernandes. Adopting a more general approach, one can see that every Lie algebroid integrates to a stacky Lie groupoid.

=== Ševera-Weinstein groupoid ===
Given any Lie algebroid $A$, the natural candidate for an integration is given by $G(A):= P(A)/\sim$, where $P(A)$ denotes the space of $A$-paths and $\sim$ the relation of $A$-homotopy between them. This is often called the Weinstein groupoid or Ševera-Weinstein groupoid.

Indeed, one can show that $G(A)$ is an $s$-simply connected topological groupoid, with the multiplication induced by the concatenation of paths. Moreover, if $A$ is integrable, $G(A)$ admits a smooth structure such that it coincides with the unique $s$-simply connected Lie groupoid integrating $A$.

Accordingly, the only obstruction to integrability lies in the smoothness of $G(A)$. This approach led to the introduction of objects called monodromy groups, associated to any Lie algebroid, and to the following fundamental result:

A Lie algebroid is integrable if and only if its monodromy groups are uniformly discrete.

Such statement simplifies in the transitive case:

A transitive Lie algebroid is integrable if and only if its monodromy groups are discrete.

The results above show also that every Lie algebroid admits an integration to a local Lie groupoid (roughly speaking, a Lie groupoid where the multiplication is defined only in a neighbourhood around the identity elements).

=== Integrable examples ===
- Lie algebras are always integrable (by Lie III theorem)
- Atiyah algebroids of a principal bundle are always integrable (to the gauge groupoid of that principal bundle)
- Lie algebroids with injective anchor (hence foliation algebroids) are always integrable (by Frobenius theorem)
- Lie algebra bundle are always integrable
- Action Lie algebroids are always integrable (but the integration is not necessarily an action Lie groupoid)
- Any Lie subalgebroid of an integrable Lie algebroid is integrable.

=== A non-integrable example ===
Consider the Lie algebroid $A_\omega = TM \times \mathbb{R} \to M$ associated to a closed 2-form $\omega \in \Omega^2(M)$ and the group of spherical periods associated to $\omega$, i.e. the image $\Lambda:= \mathrm{Im}(\Phi) \subseteq \mathbb{R}$ of the following group homomorphism from the second homotopy group of $M$

$$\Phi: \pi_2(M) \to \mathbb{R}: \quad [f] \mapsto \int_{S^2} f^*\omega.$$

Since $A_\omega$ is transitive, it is integrable if and only if it is the Atyah algebroid of some principal bundle; a careful analysis shows that this happens if and only if the subgroup $\Lambda \subseteq \mathbb{R}$ is a lattice, i.e. it is discrete. An explicit example where such condition fails is given by taking $M = S^2 \times S^2$ and $\omega = \mathrm{pr}_1^* \sigma + \sqrt2 \mathrm{pr}_2^* \sigma \in \Omega^2(M)$ for $\sigma \in \Omega^2(S^2)$ the area form. Here $\Lambda$ turns out to be $\mathbb{Z}+\sqrt2 \mathbb{Z}$, which is dense in $\mathbb{R}$.

== See also ==
- R-algebroid
- Lie bialgebroid

== Books and lecture notes ==
- Alan Weinstein, Groupoids: unifying internal and external symmetry, AMS Notices, 43 (1996), 744–752. Also available at arXiv:math/9602220.
- Kirill Mackenzie, Lie Groupoids and Lie Algebroids in Differential Geometry, Cambridge U. Press, 1987.
- Kirill Mackenzie, General Theory of Lie Groupoids and Lie Algebroids, Cambridge U. Press, 2005.
- Marius Crainic, Rui Loja Fernandes, Lectures on Integrability of Lie Brackets, Geometry&Topology Monographs 17 (2011) 1–107, available at arXiv:math/0611259.
- Eckhard Meinrenken, Lecture notes on Lie groupoids and Lie algebroids, available at https://www.math.utoronto.ca/mein/teaching/MAT1341_LieGroupoids/Groupoids.pdf.
- Ieke Moerdijk, Janez Mrčun, Introduction to Foliations and Lie Groupoids, Cambridge U. Press, 2010.
