= Pseudogroup =

Concept in mathematics

In mathematics, a pseudogroup is a set of homeomorphisms between open sets of a space, satisfying group-like and sheaf-like properties. It is a generalisation of the concept of a transformation group, originating however from the geometric approach of Sophus Lie to investigate symmetries of differential equations, rather than out of abstract algebra (such as quasigroup, for example). The modern theory of pseudogroups was developed by Élie Cartan in the early 1900s.

== Definition ==
A pseudogroup imposes several conditions on sets of homeomorphisms (respectively, diffeomorphisms) defined on open sets U of a given Euclidean space or more generally of a fixed topological space (respectively, smooth manifold). Since two homeomorphisms h : U → V and g : V → W compose to a homeomorphism from U to W, one asks that the pseudogroup is closed under composition and inversion. However, unlike those for a group, the axioms defining a pseudogroup are not purely algebraic; the further requirements are related to the possibility of restricting and of patching homeomorphisms (similar to the gluing axiom for sections of a sheaf).

More precisely, a pseudogroup on a topological space S is a collection Γ of homeomorphisms between open subsets of S satisfying the following properties:

1. The domains of the elements g in Γ cover S ("cover").
2. The restriction of an element g in Γ to any open set contained in its domain is also in Γ ("restriction").
3. The composition g ∘ h of two elements of Γ, when defined, is in Γ ("composition").
4. The inverse of an element of g is in Γ ("inverse").
5. The property of lying in Γ is local, i.e. if g : U → V is a homeomorphism between open sets of S and U is covered by open sets U_{i} with g restricted to U_{i} lying in Γ for each i, then g also lies in Γ ("local").

As a consequence the identity homeomorphism of any open subset of S lies in Γ.

Similarly, a pseudogroup on a smooth manifold X is defined as a collection Γ of diffeomorphisms between open subsets of X satisfying analogous properties (where we replace homeomorphisms with diffeomorphisms).

Two points in X are said to be in the same orbit if an element of Γ sends one to the other. Orbits of a pseudogroup clearly form a partition of X; a pseudogroup is called transitive if it has only one orbit.

== Examples ==
A widespread class of examples is given by pseudogroups preserving a given geometric structure. For instance, if (X, g) is a Riemannian manifold, one has the pseudogroup of its local isometries; if (X, ω) is a symplectic manifold, one has the pseudogroup of its local symplectomorphisms; etc. These pseudogroups should be thought as the set of the local symmetries of these structures.

== Pseudogroups of symmetries and geometric structures ==
Manifolds with additional structures can often be defined using the pseudogroups of symmetries of a fixed local model. More precisely, given a pseudogroup Γ, a Γ-atlas on a topological space S consists of a standard atlas on S such that the changes of coordinates (i.e. the transition maps) belong to Γ. An equivalent class of Γ-atlases is also called a Γ-structure on S.

In particular, when Γ is the pseudogroup of all locally defined diffeomorphisms of R^{n}, one recovers the standard notion of a smooth atlas and a smooth structure. More generally, one can define the following objects as Γ-structures on a topological space S:

- flat Riemannian structures, for Γ pseudogroups of isometries of R^{n} with the canonical Euclidean metric;
- symplectic structures, for Γ the pseudogroup of symplectomorphisms of R^{2n} with the canonical symplectic form;
- analytic structures, for Γ the pseudogroup of (real-)analytic diffeomorphisms of R^{n};
- Riemann surfaces, for Γ the pseudogroup of invertible holomorphic functions of a complex variable.

More generally, any integrable G-structure and any (G, X)-manifold are special cases of Γ-structures, for suitable pseudogroups Γ.

== Pseudogroups and Lie theory ==
In general, pseudogroups were studied as a possible theory of infinite-dimensional Lie groups. The concept of a local Lie group, namely a pseudogroup of functions defined in neighbourhoods of the origin of a Euclidean space E, is actually closer to Lie's original concept of Lie group, in the case where the transformations involved depend on a finite number of parameters, than the contemporary definition via manifolds. One of Cartan's achievements was to clarify the points involved, including the point that a local Lie group always gives rise to a global group, in the current sense (an analogue of Lie's third theorem, on Lie algebras determining a group). The formal group is yet another approach to the specification of Lie groups, infinitesimally. It is known, however, that local topological groups do not necessarily have global counterparts.

Examples of infinite-dimensional pseudogroups abound, beginning with the pseudogroup of all diffeomorphisms of E. The interest is mainly in sub-pseudogroups of the diffeomorphisms, and therefore with objects that have a Lie algebra analogue of vector fields. Methods proposed by Lie and by Cartan for studying these objects have become more practical given the progress of computer algebra.

In the 1950s, Cartan's theory was reformulated by Shiing-Shen Chern, and a general deformation theory for pseudogroups was developed by Kunihiko Kodaira and D. C. Spencer. In the 1960s homological algebra was applied to the basic PDE questions of over-determination; however, this revealed that the algebra of the theory is potentially very heavy. In the same decade the interest for theoretical physics of infinite-dimensional Lie theory appeared for the first time, in the shape of current algebra.

Intuitively, a Lie pseudogroup should be a pseudogroup which "originates" from a system of PDEs. There are many similar but inequivalent notions in the literature; the "right" one depends on which application one has in mind. However, all these various approaches involve the (finite- or infinite-dimensional) jet bundles of Γ, which are asked to be a Lie groupoid. In particular, a Lie pseudogroup is called of finite order k if it can be "reconstructed" from the space of its k-jets.
