= Lie groupoid =

Internal groupoid in the category of smooth manifolds

In mathematics, a Lie groupoid is a groupoid where the set $\operatorname{Ob}$ of objects and the set $\operatorname{Mor}$ of morphisms are both manifolds, all the category operations (source and target, composition, identity-assigning map and inversion) are smooth, and the source and target operations

$$s,t : \operatorname{Mor} \to \operatorname{Ob}$$

are submersions.

A Lie groupoid can thus be thought of as a "many-object generalization" of a Lie group, just as a groupoid is a many-object generalization of a group. Accordingly, while Lie groups provide a natural model for (classical) continuous symmetries, Lie groupoids are often used as model for (and arise from) generalised, point-dependent symmetries. Extending the correspondence between Lie groups and Lie algebras, Lie groupoids are the global counterparts of Lie algebroids.

Lie groupoids were introduced by Charles Ehresmann under the name differentiable groupoids.

== Definition and basic concepts ==
A Lie groupoid consists of

- two smooth manifolds $G$ and $M$
- two surjective submersions $s,t : G \to M$ (called, respectively, source and target projections)
- a map $m: G^{(2)}:= \{ (g,h) \mid s(g)=t(h) \} \to G$ (called multiplication or composition map), where we use the notation $gh := m (g,h)$
- a map $u: M \to G$ (called unit map or object inclusion map), where we use the notation $1_x:= u(x)$
- a map $i: G \to G$ (called inversion), where we use the notation $g^{-1} := i(g)$

such that

- the composition satisfies $s(gh) = s(h)$ and $t(gh) = t(g)$ for every $g,h \in G$ for which the composition is defined
- the composition is associative, i.e. $g(h l) = (gh) l$ for every $g,h,l \in G$ for which the composition is defined
- $u$ works as an identity, i.e. $s(1_x) = t(1_x) = x$ for every $x \in M$ and $g 1_{s(g)} = g$ and $1_{t(g)} g = g$ for every $g \in G$ for which the respective compositions are defined
- $i$ works as an inverse, i.e. $g^{-1} g = 1_{s(g)}$ and $g g^{-1} = 1_{t(g)}$ for every $g \in G$.

Using the language of category theory, a Lie groupoid can be more compactly defined as a groupoid (i.e. a small category where all the morphisms are invertible) such that the sets $M$ of objects and $G$ of morphisms are manifolds, the maps $s$, $t$, $m$, $i$ and $u$ are smooth and $s$ and $t$ are submersions. A Lie groupoid is therefore not simply a groupoid object in the category of smooth manifolds: one has to ask the additional property that $s$ and $t$ are submersions.

Lie groupoids are often denoted by $G \rightrightarrows M$, where the two arrows represent the source and the target. The notation $G_1 \rightrightarrows G_0$ is also frequently used, especially when stressing the simplicial structure of the associated nerve.

In order to include more natural examples, the manifold $G$ is not required in general to be Hausdorff or second countable (while $M$ and all other spaces are).

=== Alternative definitions ===
The original definition by Ehresmann required $G$ and $M$ to possess a smooth structure such that only $m$ is smooth and the maps $g \mapsto 1_{s(g)}$ and $g \mapsto 1_{t(g)}$ are subimmersions (i.e. have locally constant rank). Such definition proved to be too weak and was replaced by Pradines with the one currently used.

While some authors introduced weaker definitions which did not require $s$ and $t$ to be submersions, these properties are fundamental to develop the entire Lie theory of groupoids and algebroids.

=== First properties ===
The fact that the source and the target map of a Lie groupoid $G \rightrightarrows M$ are smooth submersions has some immediate consequences:

- the $s$-fibres $s^{-1}(x) \subseteq G$, the $t$-fibres $t^{-1}(x) \subseteq G$, and the set of composable morphisms $G^{(2)} \subseteq G \times G$ are submanifolds;
- the inversion map $i$ is a diffeomorphism;
- the unit map $u$ is a smooth embedding;
- the isotropy groups $G_x$ are Lie groups;
- the orbits $\mathcal{O}_x \subseteq M$ are immersed submanifolds;
- the $s$-fibre $s^{-1}(x)$ at a point $x \in M$ is a principal $G_x$-bundle over the orbit $\mathcal{O}_x$ at that point.

=== Subobjects and morphisms ===
A Lie subgroupoid of a Lie groupoid $G \rightrightarrows M$ is a subgroupoid $H \rightrightarrows N$ (i.e. a subcategory of the category $G$) with the extra requirement that $H \subseteq G$ is an immersed submanifold. As for a subcategory, a (Lie) subgroupoid is called wide if $N = M$. Any Lie groupoid $G \rightrightarrows M$ has two canonical wide subgroupoids:

- the unit/identity Lie subgroupoid $u(M) = \{ 1_x \in G \mid x \in M \}$;
- the inner subgroupoid $IG := \{ g \in G \mid s(g)=t(g) \}$, i.e. the bundle of isotropy groups (which however may fail to be smooth in general).

A normal Lie subgroupoid is a wide Lie subgroupoid $H \subseteq G$ inside $IG$ such that, for every $h \in H, g \in G$ with $s(h)=t(h)=s(g)$, one has $ghg^{-1} \in H$. The isotropy groups of $H$ are therefore normal subgroups of the isotropy groups of $G$.

A Lie groupoid morphism between two Lie groupoids $G \rightrightarrows M$ and $H \rightrightarrows N$ is a groupoid morphism $F: G \to H, f: M \to N$ (i.e. a functor between the categories $G$ and $H$), where both $F$ and $f$ are smooth. The kernel $\ker(F):= \{ g \in G \mid F(g) = 1_{s(g)} \}$ of a morphism between Lie groupoids over the same base manifold is automatically a normal Lie subgroupoid.

The quotient $G/\ker(F) \rightrightarrows M$ has a natural groupoid structure such that the projection $G \to G/\ker(F)$ is a groupoid morphism; however, unlike quotients of Lie groups, $G/\ker(F)$ may fail to be a Lie groupoid in general. Accordingly, the isomorphism theorems for groupoids cannot be specialised to the entire category of Lie groupoids, but only to special classes.

A Lie groupoid is called abelian if its isotropy Lie groups are abelian. For similar reasons as above, while the definition of abelianisation of a group extends to set-theoretical groupoids, in the Lie case the analogue of the quotient $G^{ab} = G/(IG, IG)$ may not exist or be smooth.

=== Bisections ===
A bisection of a Lie groupoid $G \rightrightarrows M$ is a smooth map $b: M \to G$ such that $s \circ b = id_M$ and $t \circ b$ is a diffeomorphism of $M$. In order to overcome the lack of symmetry between the source and the target, a bisection can be equivalently defined as a submanifold $B \subseteq G$ such that $s_{\mid B}: B \to M$ and $t_{\mid B}: B \to M$ are diffeomorphisms; the relation between the two definitions is given by $B = b(M)$.

The set of bisections forms a group, with the multiplication $b_1 \cdot b_2$ defined as
$$(b_1 \cdot b_2) (x) := b_1 (b_2 (x)) b_2(x).$$
and inversion defined as
$$b_1^{-1} (x) := i \circ b_1 \left( (t\circ b_2)^{-1} (x) \right)$$
Note that the definition is given in such a way that, if $t \circ b_1 = \phi_1$ and $t \circ b_2 = \phi_2$, then $t \circ (b_1 \cdot b_2) = \phi_1 \circ \phi_2$ and $t \circ b_1^{-1} = \phi_1^{-1}$.

The group of bisections can be given the compact-open topology, as well as an (infinite-dimensional) structure of Fréchet manifold compatible with the group structure, making it into a Fréchet-Lie group.

A local bisection $b: U \subseteq M \to G$ is defined analogously, but the multiplication between local bisections is of course only partially defined.

== Examples ==
=== Trivial and extreme cases ===
- Lie groupoids $G \rightrightarrows {*}$ with one object are the same thing as Lie groups.
- Given any manifold $M$, there is a Lie groupoid $M \times M \rightrightarrows M$ called the pair groupoid, with precisely one morphism from any object to any other.
- The two previous examples are particular cases of the trivial groupoid $M \times G \times M \rightrightarrows M$, with structure maps $s(x,g,y)= y$, $t(x,g,y)=x$, $m ((x,g,y),(y,h,z))=(x,gh,z)$, $u(x) = (x,1,x)$ and $i(x,g,y)= (y,g^{-1},x)$.
- Given any manifold $M$, there is a Lie groupoid $u(M) \rightrightarrows M$ called the unit groupoid, with precisely one morphism from one object to itself, namely the identity, and no morphisms between different objects.
- More generally, Lie groupoids with $s=t$ are the same thing as bundle of Lie groups (not necessarily locally trivial). For instance, any vector bundle is a bundle of abelian groups, so it is in particular a(n abelian) Lie groupoid.

=== Constructions from other Lie groupoids ===
- Given any Lie groupoid $G \rightrightarrows M$ and a surjective submersion $\mu: N \to M$, there is a Lie groupoid $\mu^*G \rightrightarrows N$, called its pullback groupoid or induced groupoid, where $\mu^*G \subseteq N \times G \times N$ contains triples $(x,g,y)$ such that $s(g)=\mu(y)$ and $t(g) = \mu(x)$, and the multiplication is defined using the multiplication of $G$. For instance, the pullback of the pair groupoid of $M$ is the pair groupoid of $N$.
- Given any two Lie groupoids $G_1 \rightrightarrows M_1$ and $G_2 \rightrightarrows M_2$, there is a Lie groupoid $G_1 \times G_2 \rightrightarrows M_1 \times M_2$, called their direct product, such that the groupoid morphisms $G_1 \times G_2 \to \mathrm{pr}_{M_1}^*G_1$ and $G_1 \times G_2 \to \mathrm{pr}_{M_2}^*G_2$ are surjective submersions.
- Given any Lie groupoid $G \rightrightarrows M$, there is a Lie groupoid $TG \rightrightarrows TM$, called its tangent groupoid, obtained by considering the tangent bundle of $G$ and $M$ and the differential of the structure maps.
- Given any Lie groupoid $G \rightrightarrows M$, there is a Lie groupoid $T^*G \rightrightarrows A^*$, called its cotangent groupoid obtained by considering the cotangent bundle of $G$, the dual of the Lie algebroid $A$ (see below), and suitable structure maps involving the differentials of the left and right translations.
- Given any Lie groupoid $G \rightrightarrows M$, there is a Lie groupoid $J^k G \rightrightarrows M$, called its jet groupoid, obtained by considering the k-jets of the local bisections of $G$ (with smooth structure inherited from the jet bundle of $s: G \to M$) and setting $s(j^k_x b) = x$, $t(j^k_x b) = t(b(x))$, $m(j^k_{t(b(x))} b_1, j^k_x b_2) = j^k_x (b_1 \cdot b_2)$, $u(x) = j^k_x u$ and $i(j^k_x b) = j^k_{t(b(x))} b^{-1}$.

=== Examples from differential geometry ===
- Given a submersion $\mu: M \to N$, there is a Lie groupoid $M \times_\mu M := \{ (x,y) \in M \times M \mid \mu(x)=\mu(y) \} \rightrightarrows M$, called the submersion groupoid or fibred pair groupoid, whose structure maps are induced from the pair groupoid $M \times M \rightrightarrows M$ (the condition that $\mu$ is a submersion ensures the smoothness of $M \times_\mu M$). If $N$ is a point, one recovers the pair groupoid.
- Given a Lie group $G$ acting on a manifold $M$, there is a Lie groupoid $G \times M \rightrightarrows M$, called the action groupoid or translation groupoid, with one morphism for each triple $g \in G, x,y \in M$ with $gx = y$.
- Given any vector bundle $E\to M$, there is a Lie groupoid $GL(E) \rightrightarrows M$, called the general linear groupoid, with morphisms between $x,y \in M$ being linear isomorphisms between the fibres $E_x$ and $E_y$. For instance, if $E = M \times \mathbb{R}^n$ is the trivial vector bundle of rank $k$, then $GL(E) \rightrightarrows M$ is the action groupoid.
- Any principal bundle $P\to M$ with structure group $G$ defines a Lie groupoid $(P\times P)/G \rightrightarrows M$, where $G$ acts on the pairs $(p,q) \in P \times P$ componentwise, called the gauge groupoid. The multiplication is defined via compatible representatives as in the pair groupoid.
- Any foliation $\mathcal{F}$ on a manifold $M$ defines two Lie groupoids, $\mathrm{Mon}(\mathcal{F}) \rightrightarrows M$ (or $\Pi_1(\mathcal{F}) \rightrightarrows M$) and $\mathrm{Hol}(\mathcal{F}) \rightrightarrows M$, called respectively the monodromy/homotopy/fundamental groupoid and the holonomy groupoid of $\mathcal{F}$, whose morphisms consist of the homotopy, respectively holonomy, equivalence classes of paths entirely lying in a leaf of $\mathcal{F}$. For instance, when $\mathcal{F}$ is the trivial foliation with only one leaf, one recovers, respectively, the fundamental groupoid and the pair groupoid of $M$. On the other hand, when $\mathcal{F}$ is a simple foliation, i.e. the foliation by (connected) fibres of a submersion $\mu: M \to N$, its holonomy groupoid is precisely the submersion groupoid $M \times_\mu M$ but its monodromy groupoid may even fail to be Hausdorff, due to a general criterion in terms of vanishing cycles. In general, many elementary foliations give rise to monodromy and holonomy groupoids which are not Hausdorff.
- Given any pseudogroup $\Gamma \subseteq \mathrm{Diff}_{loc}(M)$, there is a Lie groupoid $G = \mathrm{Germ}(\Gamma) \rightrightarrows M$, called its germ groupoid, endowed with the sheaf topology and with structure maps analogous to those of the jet groupoid. This is another natural example of Lie groupoid whose arrow space is not Hausdorff nor second countable.

== Important classes of Lie groupoids ==
Note that some of the following classes make sense already in the category of set-theoretical or topological groupoids.

=== Transitive groupoids ===
A Lie groupoid is transitive (in older literature also called connected) if it satisfies one of the following equivalent conditions:

- there is only one orbit;
- there is at least a morphism between any two objects;
- the map $(s,t): G \to M \times M$ (also known as the anchor of $G \rightrightarrows M$) is surjective.

Gauge groupoids constitute the prototypical examples of transitive Lie groupoids: indeed, any transitive Lie groupoid is isomorphic to the gauge groupoid of some principal bundle, namely the $G_x$-bundle $t: s^{-1}(x) \to M$, for any point $x \in M$. For instance:

- the trivial Lie groupoid $M \times G \times M \rightrightarrows M$ is transitive and arise from the trivial principal $G$-bundle $G \times M \to M$. As particular cases, Lie groups $G \rightrightarrows {*}$ and pair groupoids $M \times M \rightrightarrows M$ are trivially transitive, and arise, respectively, from the principal $G$-bundle $G \to {*}$, and from the principal $\{e\}$-bundle $M \to M$;
- an action groupoid $G \times M \rightrightarrows M$ is transitive if and only if the group action is transitive, and in such case it arises from the principal bundle $G \to M$ with structure group the isotropy group (at an arbitrary point);
- the general linear groupoid of $E$ is transitive, and arises from the frame bundle $Fr(E) \to M$;
- pullback groupoids, jet groupoids and tangent groupoids of $G \rightrightarrows M$ are transitive if and only if $G \rightrightarrows M$ is transitive.

As a less trivial instance of the correspondence between transitive Lie groupoids and principal bundles, consider the fundamental groupoid $\Pi_1(M)$ of a (connected) smooth manifold $M$. This is naturally a topological groupoid, which is moreover transitive; one can see that $\Pi_1(M)$ is isomorphic to the gauge groupoid of the universal cover of $M$. Accordingly, $\Pi_1(M)$ inherits a smooth structure which makes it into a Lie groupoid.

Submersions groupoids $M \times_\mu M \rightrightarrows M$ are an example of non-transitive Lie groupoids, whose orbits are precisely the fibres of $\mu$.

A stronger notion of transitivity requires the anchor $(s,t): G \to M \times M$ to be a surjective submersion. Such condition is also called local triviality, because $G$ becomes locally isomorphic (as Lie groupoid) to a trivial groupoid over any open $U \subseteq M$ (as a consequence of the local triviality of principal bundles).

When the space $G$ is second countable, transitivity implies local triviality. Accordingly, these two conditions are equivalent for many examples but not for all of them: for instance, if $\Gamma$ is a transitive pseudogroup, its germ groupoid $\mathrm{Germ}(\Gamma)$ is transitive but not locally trivial.

=== Proper groupoids ===
A Lie groupoid is called proper if $(s,t): G \to M \times M$ is a proper map. As a consequence

- all isotropy groups of $G$ are compact;
- all orbits of $G$ are closed submanifolds;
- the orbit space $M/G$ is Hausdorff.

For instance:

- a Lie group is proper if and only if it is compact;
- pair groupoids are always proper;
- unit groupoids are always proper;
- an action groupoid is proper if and only if the action is proper;
- the fundamental groupoid is proper if and only if the fundamental groups are finite.

As seen above, properness for Lie groupoids is the "right" analogue of compactness for Lie groups. One could also consider more "natural" conditions, e.g. asking that the source map $s: G \to M$ is proper (then $G \rightrightarrows M$ is called s-proper), or that the entire space $G$ is compact (then $G \rightrightarrows M$ is called compact), but these requirements turns out to be too strict for many examples and applications.

=== Étale groupoids ===
A Lie groupoid is called étale if it satisfies one of the following equivalent conditions:

- the dimensions of $G$ and $M$ are equal;
- $s$ is a local diffeomorphism;
- all the $s$-fibres are discrete

As a consequence, also the $t$-fibres, the isotropy groups and the orbits become discrete.

For instance:

- a Lie group is étale if and only if it is discrete;
- pair groupoids are never étale;
- unit groupoids are always étale;
- an action groupoid is étale if and only if $G$ is discrete;
- germ groupoids of pseudogroups are always étale.

=== Effective groupoids ===
An étale groupoid is called effective if, for any two local bisections $b_1, b_2$, the condition $t \circ b_1 = t \circ b_2$ implies $b_1 = b_2$. For instance:

- Lie groups are effective if and only if are trivial;
- unit groupoids are always effective;
- an action groupoid is effective if the $G$-action is free and $G$ is discrete.

In general, any effective étale groupoid arise as the germ groupoid of some pseudogroup. However, a (more involved) definition of effectiveness, which does not assume the étale property, can also be given.

=== Source-connected groupoids ===
A Lie groupoid is called $s$-connected if all its $s$-fibres are connected. Similarly, one talks about $s$-simply connected groupoids (when the $s$-fibres are simply connected) or source-k-connected groupoids (when the $s$-fibres are k-connected, i.e. the first $k$ homotopy groups are trivial).

Note that the entire space of arrows $G$ is not asked to satisfy any connectedness hypothesis. However, if $G$ is a source-$k$-connected Lie groupoid over a $k$-connected manifold, then $G$ itself is automatically $k$-connected.

For instanceː

- Lie groups are source $k$-connected if and only if they are $k$-connected;
- a pair groupoid is source $k$-connected if and only if $M$ is $k$-connected;
- unit groupoids are always source $k$-connected;
- action groupoids are source $k$-connected if and only if $G$ is $k$-connected;
- monodromy groupoids (hence also fundamental groupoids) are source simply connected;
- a gauge groupoid associated to a principal bundle $P\to M$ is source $k$-connected if and only if the total space $P$ is.

== Further related concepts ==
=== Actions and principal bundles ===
Recall that an action of a groupoid $G \rightrightarrows M$ on a set $P$ along a function $\mu: P \rightarrow M$ is defined via a collection of maps $\mu^{-1}(x) \to \mu^{-1}(y), \quad p \mapsto g \cdot p$ for each morphism $g \in G$ between $x,y \in M$. Accordingly, an action of a Lie groupoid $G \rightrightarrows M$ on a manifold $P$ along a smooth map $\mu: P \rightrightarrows M$ consists of a groupoid action where the maps $\mu^{-1}(x) \to \mu^{-1}(y)$ are smooth. Of course, for every $x \in M$ there is an induced smooth action of the isotropy group $G_x$ on the fibre $\mu^{-1}(x)$.

Given a Lie groupoid $G \rightrightarrows M$, a principal $G$-bundle consists of a $G$-space $P$ and a $G$-invariant surjective submersion $\pi: P \to N$ such that
$$P \times_N G \to P \times_\pi P, \quad (p,g) \mapsto (p,p \cdot g)$$
is a diffeomorphism. Equivalent (but more involved) definitions can be given using $G$-valued cocycles or local trivialisations.

When $G$ is a Lie groupoid over a point, one recovers, respectively, standard Lie group actions and principal bundles.

=== Representations ===
A representation of a Lie groupoid $G \rightrightarrows M$ consists of a Lie groupoid action on a vector bundle $\pi: E \to M$, such that the action is fibrewise linear, i.e. each bijection $\pi^{-1}(x) \to \pi^{-1}(y)$ is a linear isomorphism. Equivalently, a representation of $G$ on $E$ can be described as a Lie groupoid morphism from $G$ to the general linear groupoid $GL(E)$.

Of course, any fibre $E_x$ becomes a representation of the isotropy group $G_x$. More generally, representations of transitive Lie groupoids are uniquely determined by representations of their isotropy groups, via the construction of the associated vector bundle.

Examples of Lie groupoids representations include the following:

- representations of Lie groups $G \rightrightarrows {*}$ recover standard Lie group representations
- representations of pair groupoids $M \times M \rightrightarrows M$ are trivial vector bundles
- representations of unit groupoids $M \rightrightarrows M$ are vector bundles
- representations of action groupoid $G \times M \rightrightarrows M$ are $G$-equivariant vector bundles
- representations of fundamental groupoids $\Pi_1(M)$ are vector bundles endowed with flat connections

The set $\mathrm{Rep}(G)$ of isomorphism classes of representations of a Lie groupoid $G \rightrightarrows M$ has a natural structure of semiring, with direct sums and tensor products of vector bundles.

=== Differentiable cohomology ===
The notion of differentiable cohomology for Lie groups generalises naturally also to Lie groupoids: the definition relies on the simplicial structure of the nerve $N(G)_n = G^{(n)}$ of $G \rightrightarrows M$, viewed as a category.

More precisely, recall that the space $G^{(n)}$ consists of strings of $n$ composable morphisms, i.e.

$G^{(n)}:= \{ (g_1,\ldots,g_n) \in G \times \ldots \times G \mid s(g_i)=t(g_{i+1}) \quad \forall i=1,\ldots,n-1 \},$

and consider the map $t^{(n)} = t \circ \mathrm{pr}_1: G^{(n)}\to M, (g_1,\ldots,g_n) \mapsto t(g_1)$.

A differentiable $n$-cochain of $G \rightrightarrows M$ with coefficients in some representation $E \to M$ is a smooth section of the pullback vector bundle $(t^{(n)})^*E \to G^{(n)}$. One denotes by $C^n(G,E)$ the space of such $n$-cochains, and considers the differential $d_n: C^n(G,E) \to C^{n+1}(G,E)$, defined as

$d_n(c)(g_1,\ldots,g_{n+1}):= g_1 \cdot c(g_2,\ldots,g_{n+1}) +\sum_{i=1}^n (-1)^i c (g_1,\ldots, g_i g_{i+1}, \ldots,g_{n+1}) + (-1)^{n+1} c(g_1,\ldots,g_n).$

Then $(C^n (G, E), d^n)$ becomes a cochain complex and its cohomology, denoted by $H^n_d (G, E)$, is called the differentiable cohomology of $G \rightrightarrows M$ with coefficients in $E \to M$. Note that, since the differential at degree zero is $d_0(c)(g) = g \cdot c(s(g)) - c(t(g))$, one has always $H^0_d (G, E) = \ker(d_0) = \Gamma(E)^G$.

Of course, the differentiable cohomology of $G \rightrightarrows {*}$ as a Lie groupoid coincides with the standard differentiable cohomology of $G$ as a Lie group (in particular, for discrete groups one recovers the usual group cohomology). On the other hand, for any proper Lie groupoid $G \rightrightarrows M$, one can prove that $H^n_d (G, E) = 0$ for every $n > 0$.

=== The Lie algebroid of a Lie groupoid ===
Any Lie groupoid $G \rightrightarrows M$ has an associated Lie algebroid $A \to M$, obtained with a construction similar to the one which associates a Lie algebra to any Lie groupː

- the vector bundle $A \to M$ is the vertical bundle with respect to the source map, restricted to the elements tangent to the identities, i.e. $A:= \ker (ds)_{\mid M}$;
- the Lie bracket is obtained by identifying $\Gamma(A)$ with the left-invariant vector fields on $G$, and by transporting their Lie bracket to $A$;
- the anchor map $A \to TM$ is the differential of the target map $t: G \to M$ restricted to $A$.

The Lie group–Lie algebra correspondence generalises to some extends also to Lie groupoids: the first two Lie's theorem (also known as the subgroups–subalgebras theorem and the homomorphisms theorem) can indeed be easily adapted to this setting.

In particular, as in standard Lie theory, for any s-connected Lie groupoid $G$ there is a unique (up to isomorphism) s-simply connected Lie groupoid $\tilde{G}$ with the same Lie algebroid of $G$, and a local diffeomorphism $\tilde{G} \to G$ which is a groupoid morphism. For instance,

- given any connected manifold $M$ its pair groupoid $M \times M$ is s-connected but not s-simply connected, while its fundamental groupoid $\Pi_1(M)$ is. They both have the same Lie algebroid, namely the tangent bundle $TM \to M$, and the local diffeomorphism $\Pi_1 (M) \to M \times M$ is given by $[\gamma] \mapsto (\gamma(0),\gamma(1))$.
- given any foliation $\mathcal{F}$ on $M$, its holonomy groupoid $\mathrm{Hol}(\mathcal{F})$ is s-connected but not s-simply connected, while its monodromy groupoid $\mathrm{Mon}(\mathcal{F})$ is. They both have the same Lie algebroid, namely the foliation algebroid $\mathcal{F} \to M$, and the local diffeomorphism $\mathrm{Mon}(\mathcal{F}) \to \mathrm{Hol}(\mathcal{F})$ is given by $[\gamma] \mapsto [\gamma]$ (since the homotopy classes are smaller than the holonomy ones).

However, there is no analogue of Lie's third theoremː while several classes of Lie algebroids are integrable, there are examples of Lie algebroids, for instance related to foliation theory, which do not admit an integrating Lie groupoid. The general obstructions to the existence of such integration depend on the topology of $G$.

== Morita equivalence ==
As discussed above, the standard notion of (iso)morphism of groupoids (viewed as functors between categories) restricts naturally to Lie groupoids. However, there is a more coarse notion of equivalence, called Morita equivalence, which is more flexible and useful in applications.

First, a Morita map (also known as a weak equivalence or essential equivalence) between two Lie groupoids $G_1 \rightrightarrows G_0$ and $H_1\rightrightarrows H_0$ consists of a Lie groupoid morphism from G to H which is moreover fully faithful and essentially surjective (adapting these categorical notions to the smooth context). We say that two Lie groupoids $G_1\rightrightarrows G_0$ and $H_1\rightrightarrows H_0$ are Morita equivalent if and only if there exists a third Lie groupoid $K_1\rightrightarrows K_0$ together with two Morita maps from G to K and from H to K.

A more explicit description of Morita equivalence (e.g. useful to check that it is an equivalence relation) requires the existence of two surjective submersions $P \to G_0$ and $P \to H_0$ together with a left $G$-action and a right $H$-action, commuting with each other and making $P$ into a principal bi-bundle.

=== Morita invariance ===
Many properties of Lie groupoids, e.g. being proper, being Hausdorff or being transitive, are Morita invariant. On the other hand, being étale is not Morita invariant.

In addition, a Morita equivalence between $G_1\rightrightarrows G_0$ and $H_1\rightrightarrows H_0$ preserves their transverse geometry, i.e. it induces:

- a homeomorphism between the orbit spaces $G_0/G_1$ and $H_0/H_1$;
- an isomorphism $G_x\cong H_y$ between the isotropy groups at corresponding points $x\in G_0$ and $y\in H_0$;
- an isomorphism $\mathcal{N}_x\cong \mathcal{N}_y$ between the normal representations of the isotropy groups at corresponding points $x\in G_0$ and $y\in H_0$.

Last, the differentiable cohomologies of two Morita equivalent Lie groupoids are isomorphic.

=== Examples ===
- Isomorphic Lie groupoids are trivially Morita equivalent.
- Two Lie groups are Morita equivalent if and only if they are isomorphic as Lie groups.
- Two unit groupoids are Morita equivalent if and only if the base manifolds are diffeomorphic.
- Any transitive Lie groupoid is Morita equivalent to its isotropy groups.
- Given a Lie groupoid $G\rightrightarrows M$ and a surjective submersion $\mu: N\to M$, the pullback groupoid $\mu^*G \rightrightarrows N$ is Morita equivalent to $G\rightrightarrows M$.
- Given a free and proper Lie group action of $G$ on $M$ (therefore the quotient $M/G$ is a manifold), the action groupoid $G \times M \rightrightarrows M$ is Morita equivalent to the unit groupoid $u(M/G) \rightrightarrows M/G$.
- A Lie groupoid $G$ is Morita equivalent to an étale groupoid if and only if all isotropy groups of $G$ are discrete.

A concrete instance of the last example goes as follows. Let M be a smooth manifold and $\{U_\alpha\}$ an open cover of $M$. Its Čech groupoid $G_1\rightrightarrows G_0$ is defined by the disjoint unions $G_0:=\bigsqcup_\alpha U_\alpha$ and $G_1:=\bigsqcup_{\alpha,\beta}U_{\alpha\beta}$, where $U_{\alpha\beta}=U_\alpha \cap U_\beta\subset M$. The source and target map are defined as the embeddings $s:U_{\alpha\beta}\to U_\alpha$ and $t:U_{\alpha\beta}\to U_\beta$, and the multiplication is the obvious one if we read the $U_{\alpha\beta}$ as subsets of M (compatible points in $U_{\alpha\beta}$ and $U_{\beta\gamma}$ actually are the same in $M$ and also lie in $U_{\alpha\gamma}$). The Čech groupoid is in fact the pullback groupoid, under the obvious submersion $p:G_0\to M$, of the unit groupoid $M\rightrightarrows M$. As such, Čech groupoids associated to different open covers of $M$ are Morita equivalent.

=== Smooth stacks ===
Investigating the structure of the orbit space of a Lie groupoid leads to the notion of a smooth stack. For instance, the orbit space is a smooth manifold if the isotropy groups are trivial (as in the example of the Čech groupoid), but it is not smooth in general. The solution is to revert the problem and to define a smooth stack as a Morita-equivalence class of Lie groupoids. The natural geometric objects living on the stack are the geometric objects on Lie groupoids invariant under Morita-equivalence: an example is the Lie groupoid cohomology.

Since the notion of smooth stack is quite general, obviously all smooth manifolds are smooth stacks. Other classes of examples include orbifolds, which are (equivalence classes of) proper étale Lie groupoids, and orbit spaces of foliations.

== Books ==
- Weinstein, A. (1996). "Groupoids: unifying internal and external symmetry" (PDF). Notices of the American Mathematical Society. 43: 744–752. arXiv:math/9602220.
- MacKenzie, K. (1987). Lie Groupoids and Lie Algebroids in Differential Geometry. Cambridge University Press. doi:10.1017/CBO9780511661839. ISBN 9780521348829.
- MacKenzie, K. C. H. (2005). General Theory of Lie Groupoids and Lie Algebroids. Cambridge University Press. doi:10.1017/CBO9781107325883. ISBN 9781107325883.
- Crainic, M.; Fernandes, R. L. (2011). "Lectures on Integrability of Lie Brackets" (PDF). Geometry & Topology Monographs. 17: 1–107. arXiv:math/0611259.
- Moerdijk, I.; Mrcun, J. (2003). Introduction to Foliations and Lie Groupoids. Cambridge University Press. doi:10.1017/CBO9780511615450. ISBN 9780521831970.
