= Toby Stafford =

British mathematician

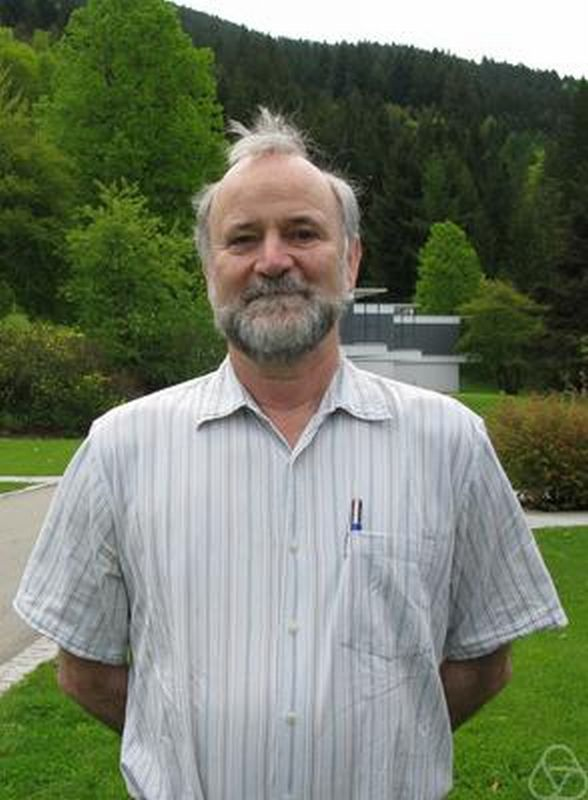
Toby Stafford

John Tobias Stafford (born 2 June 1951) is a British mathematician and Emeritus Professor at the University of Manchester.

He graduated from the University of Cambridge in 1972 and completed his PhD at the University of Leeds in 1976.

Stafford was awarded the Whitehead Prize by the London Mathematical Society in 1980. He received a Royal Society Wolfson Research Merit Award in 2007, and in 2013 was elected a Fellow of the American Mathematical Society.
