= List of Norwegian mathematicians =

A mathematician is a scholar in the fields of mathematics. They solve and research mathematical problems which can be applied in real life or completely abstract (pure). This article covers notable mathematicians from Norway.

A pioneer of modern mathematics, Niels Henrik Abel contributed greatly towards various fields of mathematics during his short life. He died in 1829, aged 26, from tuberculosis. German mathematician Felix Klein spoke of his reluctance "to part from this ideal type of researcher". In 2001, the Abel Prize was established in his honour.

Other notable mathematicians include (in alphabetical order) Carl Anton Bjerknes, Vilhelm Bjerknes, Bernt Michael Holmboe, who is known for being Abel's teacher and tutor, Sophus Lie, Idun Reiten, Atle Selberg, Thoralf Skolem and Carl Størmer.

== Alphabetical order ==
"Aa" appears under "å" as they are considered different representations of the same letter.

List of Norwegian mathematicians by surname
Letter	Name
A	Hanan Mohamed Abdelrahman
A	Niels Henrik Abel
A	Erik Alfsen
A	Signy Arctander
A	Ole Peder Arvesen
A	Karl Egil Aubert
A	Otto Gilbert David Aubert
B	Julie E. Backer
B	Nils Aall Barricelli
B	Arent Berntsen
B	Inga Berre
B	Richard Birkeland
B	Carl Anton Bjerknes
B	Vilhelm Bjerknes
B	Hilde Christiane Bjørnland
B	Petter Jakob Bjerve
B	Ola Bratteli
B	Ole Jacob Broch
B	Viggo Brun
D	Kristian B. Dysthe
E	Geir Ellingsrud
E	T. O. Engset
F	Odd Magnus Faltinsen
F	Jens Erik Fenstad
F	John Erik Fornæss
F	Dagfinn Føllesdal
G	Johan Galtung
G	Ingrid Kristine Glad
G	Carl Ludvig Godske
G	John Grue
G	Alf Victor Guldberg
G	Axel Sophus Guldberg
G	Cato Maximilian Guldberg
H	Trygve Haavelmo
H	Kari Hag
H	Anders C. Hansen
H	Lars Havstad
H	Nils Lid Hjort
H	Jan Hoem
H	Helge Holden
H	Nina Holden
H	Bernt Michael Holmboe
H	Elling Holst
H	Gabriel Gabrielsen Holtsmark
H	Raphael Høegh-Krohn
H	Arnljot Høyland
J	Ernst Erich Jacobsthal
J	Gunnar Jahn
J	Ingebrigt Johansson
K	Anders Nicolai Kiær
K	Jens Kraft
K	Ivar Kristianslund
K	Sverre Krogh
L	Dan Laksov
L	Fredrik Lange-Nielsen
L	Arnfinn Laudal
L	Sophus Lie
L	Magnhild Lien
L	Wilhelm Ljunggren
L	Lisa Lorentzen
M	Eugenia Malinnikova
M	Henrik Hermann Martens
M	Jakob Mohn
M	Hans Munthe-Kaas
N	Trygve Nagell
N	Dag Normann
N	Kristen Nygaard
O	Øystein Ore
P	Enok Palm
P	Henrik Palmstrøm
P	Ragni Piene
R	Olav Reiersøl
R	Idun Reiten
R	John Rognes
R	Marie Rognes
R	Nicolai Rygg
S	Edgar B. Schieldrop
S	Tore Schweder
S	Kristian Seip
S	Atle Selberg
S	Ole Michael Ludvigsen Selberg
S	Henrik Selberg
S	Sigmund Selberg
S	Ernst Sejersted Selmer
S	Ernst Anton Henrik Sinding
S	Simen Skappel
S	Thoralf Skolem
S	Arne Sletsjøe
S	Emil Spjøtvoll
S	Berit Stensønes
S	Arild Stubhaug
S	Elizabeth Stephansen
S	Boye Strøm
S	Carl Størmer
S	Erling Størmer
S	Leif Størmer
S	Erling Sverdrup
S	Knut Sydsæter
S	Peter Ludwig Mejdell Sylow
S	Espen Søbye
T	Ralph Tambs Lyche
T	Axel Thue
T	Dag Tjøstheim
T	Jacqueline Naze Tjøtta
T	Sigve Tjøtta
T	Aslak Tveito
T	Helge Tverberg
T	Andreas Tømmerbakke
W	Caspar Wessel
W	Ragnar Winther
Ø	Bernt Øksendal
Å	Odd Aalen
Å	Stål Aanderaa
Å	Karen Aardal
Å	Johan Fredrik Aarnes
Å	Arnstein Aassve

== See also ==
- Archiv for Mathematik og Naturvidenskab
- Bjerknes (lunar crater)
- Bjerknes (Martian crater)
- List of things named after Niels Henrik Abel
  - Abel Prize
- Selberg class
- Weather forecasting
- Aanderaa–Karp–Rosenberg conjecture
