= Norwegian Mathematical Society =

- Norsk matematisk forening
- Formation: November 2, 1918; 108 years ago
- Founder: Poul Heegaard, Arnfinn Palmstrom, Richard Birkeland, and Carl Størmer
- Purpose: To promote the study of the mathematical sciences
- Members: Individuals and Institutions or Companies
- President (Formann): Bjørn Dundas
- Parent organization: International Mathematical Union
- Website: web.matematikkforeningen.no

The Norwegian Mathematical Society (Norwegian: Norsk matematisk forening, NMF) is a professional society for mathematicians. It was formed in 1918, with Carl Størmer elected as its first president. It organizes mathematical contests and the annual Abel symposium and also awards the Viggo Brun Prize to young Norwegian mathematicians for outstanding research in mathematics, including mathematical aspects of information technology, mathematical physics, numerical analysis, and computational science. The 2018 Prize winner was Rune Gjøringbø Haugseng. The NMF is a member of the International Council for Industrial and Applied Mathematics and provides the Norwegian National Committee in the International Mathematical Union.

== Past Presidents and Honorary Members ==
	Term of office	Name
1st President	1918–1925	Carl Størmer
2nd President	1925-1928	Alf Guldberg
3rd President	1928-1935	Poul Heegaard
4th President	1935-1946	Ingebrigt Johansson
5th President	1946-1951	Jonas E. Fjeldstad
6th President	1951-1953	Viggo Brun
7th President	1953-1959	Ralph Tambs Lyche
8th President	1960-1966	Karl Egil Aubert
9th President	1967-1971	Jens Erik Fenstad
10th President	1972-1974	Per Holm
11th President	1975-1982	Erling Størmer
12th President	1983-1985	Dag Normann
13th President	1985-1988	Bernt Øksendal
14th President	1989-1991	Ragni Piene
15th President	1991-1995	Geir Ellingsrud
16th President	1995-2000	Bent Birkeland
17th President	2000-2003	Dag Normann
18th President	2003-2007	Kristian Seip
19th President	2007-2011	Brynjulf Owren
20th President	2011-2015	Sigmund Selberg
21st President	2015-2019	Petter Andreas Bergh
22nd President	2019-2023	Hans Munthe-Kaas
22st President	Since 2023	Bjørn Dundas

The Society elected two Honorary Members: Carl Størmer (elected 22 February 1949) and Viggo Brun (elected 30 May 1974).
