= List of mathematicians born in the 19th century =

Mathematicians born in the 19th century listed by nationality.

== American mathematicians born in the 19th century ==
- Florence Eliza Allen (1876–1960)
- Emil Artin (1898–1962)
- George David Birkhoff (1884–1944)
- Maxime Bôcher (1867–1918)
- Leonard Eugene Dickson (1874–1954), algebra and number theory
- Jesse Douglas (1897–1965), Fields Medalist
- Edward Kasner (1878–1955)
- Solomon Lefschetz (1884–1972)
- Emilie Martin (1869–1936)
- E. H. Moore (1862–1932)
- Marston Morse (1892–1977)
- Emil Leon Post (1897–1954), logic and computability theory
- Mildred Sanderson (1889–1914)
- Oswald Veblen (1880–1960)
- Joseph L. Walsh (1895–1973)
- Oscar Zariski (1899–1986), algebra

== Austrian mathematicians born in the 19th century ==
- Emil Artin (1898–1962)
- Johann Radon (1887–1956)
- Leopold Vietoris (1891–2002)

== Belgian mathematicians born in the 19th century ==
- Eugène Charles Catalan (1814–1894)

== British mathematicians born in the 19th century ==
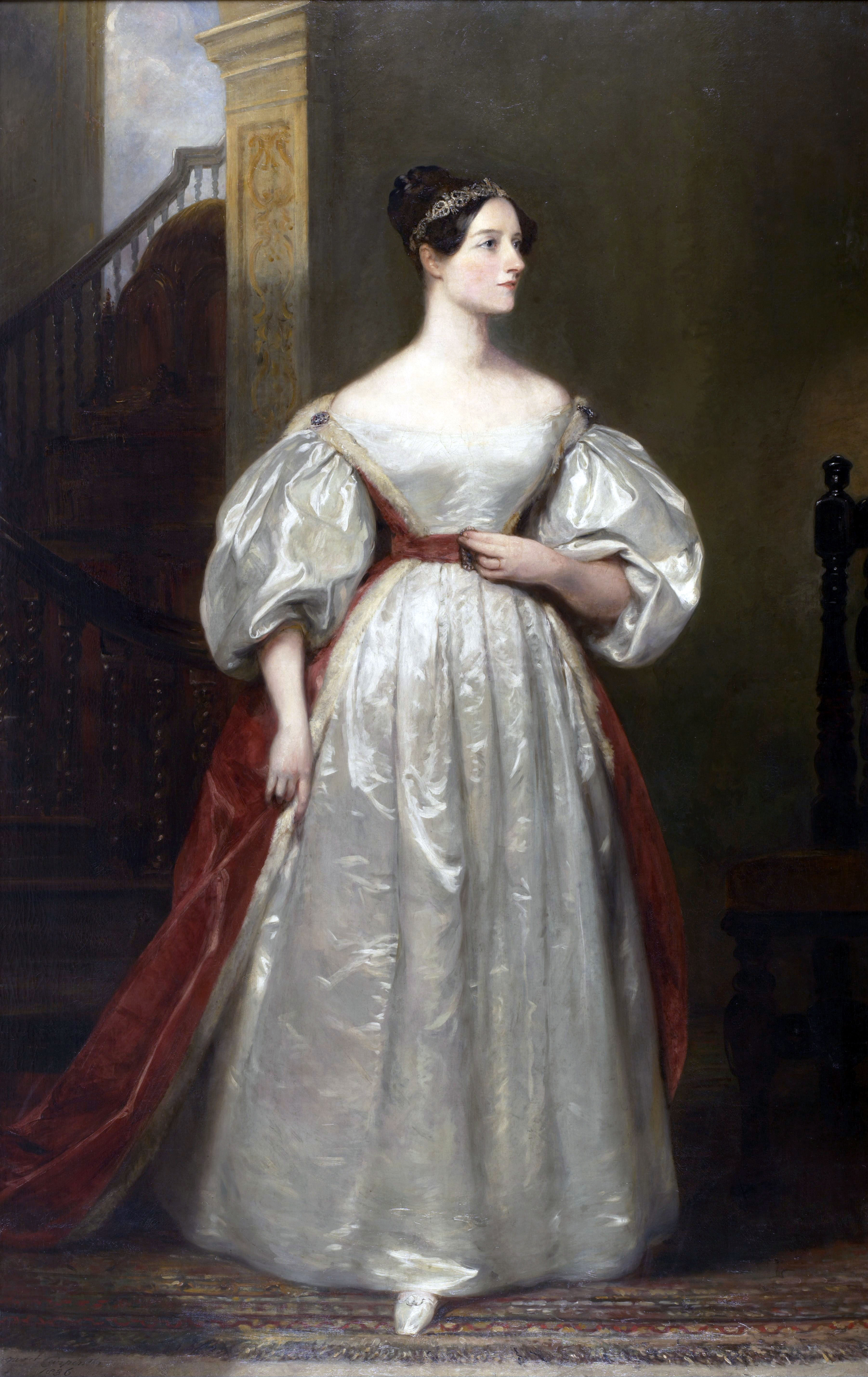
Portrait of Ada Lovelace by British painter Margaret Sarah Carpenter (1836)

- George Boole (1815–1864)
- Arthur Cayley (1821–1895)
- Augustus De Morgan (1806–1871)
- Godfrey Harold Hardy (1877–1947)
- Ada Lovelace (1815–1852)
- Percy Alexander MacMahon (1854–1929)
- Dora Metcalf (1892–1982)
- Louis J. Mordell (1888–1972), number theory
- James Joseph Sylvester (1814–1897)
- Geoffrey Ingram Taylor (1886–1975)
- Edward Charles Titchmarsh (1899–1963)
- Joseph Wedderburn (1882–1948)
- E. T. Whittaker (1873–1956)

== Βulgarian mathematicians born in the 19th century ==
- Ljubomir Chakaloff (1886–1963)

== Canadian mathematicians born in the 19th century ==
- Raymond Clare Archibald (1875–1955)

== Czech mathematicians born in the 19th century ==
- Otakar Borůvka (1899–1995)
- Eduard Čech (1893–1960), topology
- Vojtěch Jarník (1897–1970)
- Karel Petr (1868–1950)
- Emil Weyr (1848–1894)

== Danish mathematicians born in the 19th century ==
- Harald Bohr (1887–1951)

== Dutch mathematicians born in the 19th century ==
- L. E. J. Brouwer (1881–1966)
- Gustav de Vries (1866–1934)
- Arend Heyting (1898–1980)
- Diederik Korteweg (1848–1941)
- Thomas Joannes Stieltjes (1856–1894)

== Finnish mathematicians born in the 19th century ==
- Ernst Leonard Lindelöf (1870–1946)
- Rolf Nevanlinna (1895–1980), complex analysis

== French mathematicians born in the 19th century ==
- Émile Borel (1871–1956), measure theory
- Élie Cartan (1869–1951)
- Jean Gaston Darboux (1842–1917)
- Maurice René Fréchet (1878–1973)
- Charles Hermite (1822–1901)
- Gaston Julia (1893–1978)
- Henri Lebesgue (1875–1941)
- Henri Padé (1863–1953)
- Jules Henri Poincaré (1854–1912)
- Évariste Galois (1811–1832), modern algebra

== German mathematicians born in the 19th century ==
- Ludwig Bieberbach (1886–1982)
- Oskar Bolza (1857–1942)
- Georg Cantor (1845–1918)
- Max Dehn (1878–1952)
- Richard Dedekind (1831–1916)
- Peter Gustav Dirichlet (1805-1859)
- Friedrich Ludwig Gottlob Frege (1848–1925)
- Ferdinand Georg Frobenius (1849–1917)
- Carl Gustav Axel Harnack (1851–1888)
- Helmut Hasse (1898-1979)
- Felix Hausdorff (1868–1942)
- Ernst Hellinger (1883–1943)
- Kurt Hensel (1861–1941)
- David Hilbert (1862−1943)
- Heinz Hopf (1894–1971)
- Adolf Hurwitz (1859–1919)
- Felix Klein (1849–1925)
- Hellmuth Kneser (1898–1973)
- Leopold Kronecker (1823–1891)
- Ernst Kummer (1810–1893)
- Edmund Landau (1877–1938)
- Ferdinand von Lindemann (1852–1939)
- Franz Mertens (1840–1927)
- Hermann Minkowski (1864–1909)
- Emmy Noether (1882–1935)
- Bernhard Riemann (1826–1866)
- Arthur Schoenflies (1853–1928)
- Issai Schur (1875-1979)
- Carl Ludwig Siegel (1896-1981)
- Otto Toeplitz (1881-1940)
- Karl Weierstrass (1815–1897)
- Hermann Weyl (1885–1955)

== Greek mathematicians born in the 19th century ==
- Constantin Carathéodory (1873–1950)
- Georgios Remoundos (1878–1928)
- Cyparissos Stephanos (1857–1917)

== Hungarian mathematicians born in the 19th century ==
- Lipót Fejér (1880–1959)
- Alfréd Haar (1885–1933)
- Marcel Riesz (1886–1965)
- George Pólya (1887–1985)

== Indian mathematicians born in the 19th century ==
- Srinivasa Ramanujan (1887–1920)

== Irish mathematicians born in the 19th century ==
- John Casey (1820–1891)
- William Rowan Hamilton (1805–1865)

== Italian mathematicians born in the 19th century ==
- Ulisse Dini (1845–1918)
- Guido Fubini (1879–1943)
- Tullio Levi-Civita (1873–1941)
- Giuseppe Peano (1858–1932)
- Leonida Tonelli (1885–1946), calculus of variations

== Japanese mathematicians born in the 19th century ==
- Teiji Takagi (1875–1960)

== Norwegian mathematicians born in the 19th century ==
- Niels Henrik Abel (1802–1829)
- Ole Peder Arvesen (1895–1991)
- Viggo Brun (1885–1978)
- T.O. Engset (1865–1943)
- Axel Sophus Guldberg (1838–1913)
- Alf Victor Guldberg (1866–1936)
- Sophus Lie (1842–1899)
- Øystein Ore (1899–1968)
- Thoralf Skolem (1887–1963)
- Carl Størmer (1874–1957)
- Ludwig Sylow (1832–1918), group theory
- Axel Thue (1863–1922)

== Polish mathematicians born in the 19th century ==
- Stefan Banach (1892–1945), functional analysis
- Tadeusz Banachiewicz (1882–1954)
- Zygmunt Janiszewski (1888–1920)
- Stefan Kaczmarz (1895–1939)
- Bronisław Knaster (1893–1980)
- Kazimierz Kuratowski (1896–1980)
- Stanisław Leśniewski (1886–1939)
- Jan Łukasiewicz (1878–1956)
- Stefan Mazurkiewicz (1888–1945)
- Jerzy Neyman (1894–1981), statistical theory
- Juliusz Schauder (1899–1943)
- Wacław Sierpiński (1882–1969)
- Julian Sochocki (1842–1927)
- Hugo Steinhaus (1887–1972)
- Władysław Ślebodziński (1884–1972)
- Jan Śleszyński (1854–1931)
- Stanisław Zaremba (1863–1942)
- Antoni Zygmund (1900–1992), mathematical analysis
- Kazimierz Żorawski (1866–1953)

== Russian mathematicians born in the 19th century ==
- Sergei Natanovich Bernstein (1880–1968)
- Pafnuty Chebyshev (1821–1894)
- Sofia Kovalevskaia (1850–1891)
- Aleksandr Lyapunov (1857–1918)

== Swedish mathematicians born in the 19th century ==
- Lars Edvard Phragmén (1863–1937)

== Swiss mathematicians born in the 19th century ==
- Michel Plancherel (1885–1967)
