= Rognes =

Rognes may refer to:

== People ==
- John Rognes (mathematician) (born 1966), Norwegian mathematician
- Marie Rognes (born 1982), Norwegian mathematician
- John Rognes (army officer) (1902-1949), a Norwegian military officer and Milorg pioneer

== Places ==
- Rognes, Bouches-du-Rhône, a commune in the Bouches-du-Rhône department in southern France
- Rognes, Norway, a village in Midtre Gauldal municipality in Trøndelag, Norway
