= John Rognes =

John Rognes may refer to:

- John Rognes (army officer)
- John Rognes (mathematician)
