= Hans Tambs Lyche =

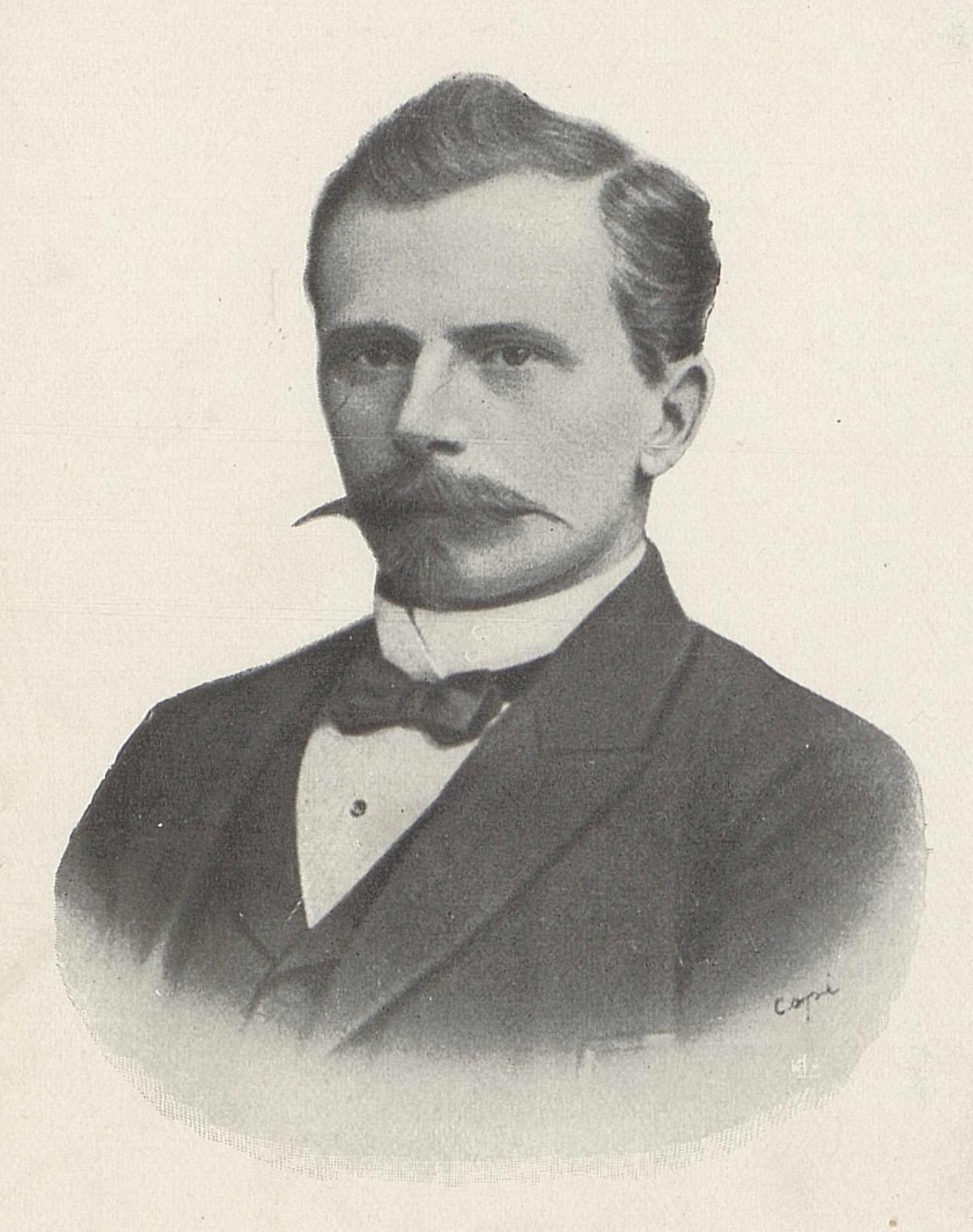
- Died: Nordstrand
- Resting place: Os cemetery
- Alma mater: Oslo Engineering College; Meadville Lombard Theological School
- Occupation: Minister

Signature
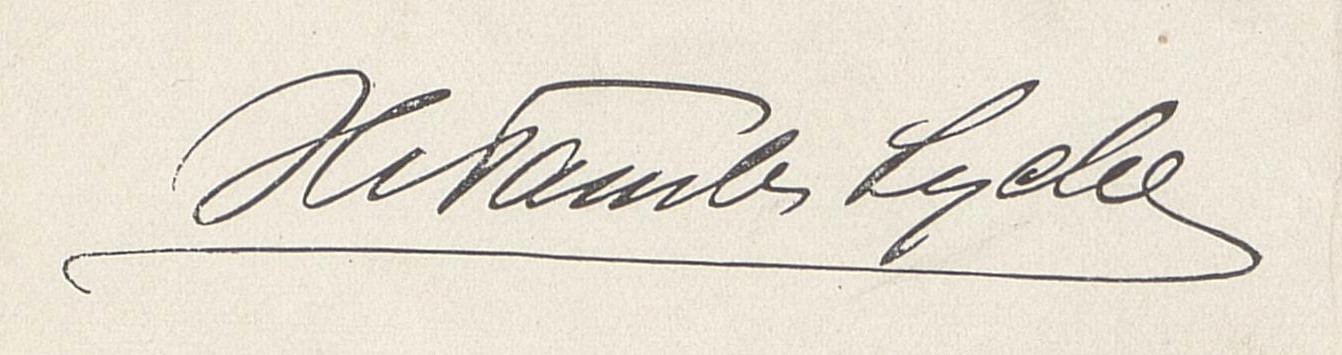

Hans Tambs Lyche ( 21 November 1859 – 16 April 1898) was a Norwegian engineer, Unitarian minister, journalist, and magazine editor.

== Background ==
Hans Tambs Lyche was born in Fredrikshald, in Østfold county, Norway. His parents were Wilhelm Julius Lyche (1823–1905) and Adelaide Thomine Tambs (1838–1867). From 1876-80, Lyche took engineering training at Kristiania Technical College (Kristiania tekniske Skole).

He emigrated to the United States in 1880. He initially found work on a railroad in Iowa. He lived first in Chicago, where he became influenced by liberal theology. In 1881, he entered Meadville Theological School, a Unitarian seminary which at that time was located in Meadville, Pennsylvania.

== Career ==
He served as a Unitarian minister in Wisconsin and Massachusetts. He held church services in English and lectured on Norwegian literature. While he lived in the United States, he also published articles in the Norwegian publication, Dagbladet, Nyt Tidsskrift and other Norwegian journals, as well as in certain American magazines. He argued for women's rights, universal suffrage, library services and electric railways. He believed more leisure time, greater social and technical progress would provide more time and desire for reading and education.

He moved back to Norway in 1892, where he founded the magazine Kringsjaa, an international journal. He was a co-founder of the unitarian magazine Frie Ord in 1894, and edited the magazine for two years. He edited the magazine Norderhov, and from 1897 he was also subeditor of the newspaper Dagbladet. He edited Kringsjaa until his untimely death in 1898. After his death, two of his books were published with a foreword by the editor of Nyt Tidsskrift, Christen Collin (1857–1926).

== Personal life ==
Lyche was married in 1885 in Janesville, Wisconsin to Mary Rebecca Godden (March 25, 1856 – September 13, 1938). Hans Tambs Lyche died of tuberculosis at only 38 years old. He was the father of noted professor and mathematician, Ralph Tambs-Lyche, and through him the grandfather of Guri Tambs-Lyche.

== Selected works ==
- Ny-Idealismen (1896) Fulltext: Internetarkivet
- Mirakler, kultur og religion (1902) Fulltext: Internetarkivet
- Lysstreif over livsproblemer (1903) Fulltext: Internetarkivet
