= Johan Sørensen =

Johan Sørensen may refer to:

- Johan Sørensen (businessman)
- Johan Sørensen (politician)
