= Fornæss =

Fornæss is a Norwegian surname. Notable people with the surname include:

- Dag Fornæss (born 1948), Norwegian speed skater
- John Erik Fornæss (born 1946), Norwegian-American mathematician
