= Ralph Tambs Lyche =

Norwegian mathematician (1890–1991)

Ralph Tambs Lyche (6 September 1890 – 15 January 1991) was a Norwegian mathematician.

He was born in Macon, Georgia as a son of Norwegian father Hans Tambs Lyche (1859–1898) and American mother Mary Rebecca Godden (1856–1938). He moved to Norway at the age of two. He finished his secondary education in Fredrikstad in 1908, and was hired as an assistant for Richard Birkeland at the Norwegian Institute of Technology in 1910. At the same time he studied at the Royal Frederick University, graduating with the cand.real. degree in 1916.

He was hired as a docent in mathematics at the Norwegian Institute of Technology in 1918. He took his doctorate in Strasbourg in 1927 following a two-year fellowship there. In 1937 he was promoted to professor, a position he held until 1950. He was then a professor at the University of Oslo until his retirement in 1961, then a visiting professor at the University of Colorado, Boulder from 1961 to 1962. His fields were mathematical analysis, function theory, algebra and number theory. He penned about 60 mathematical works, and also a few publications in botany; he was a hobby herbarist. He also became widely known for his mathematical textbooks, both for the upper secondary school (Matematikk for den høgre skolen) and another for technical colleges and universities (Lærebok i matematisk analyse). He was an editorial board member of the journal Nordisk Matematisk Tidsskrift from 1954 to 1960.

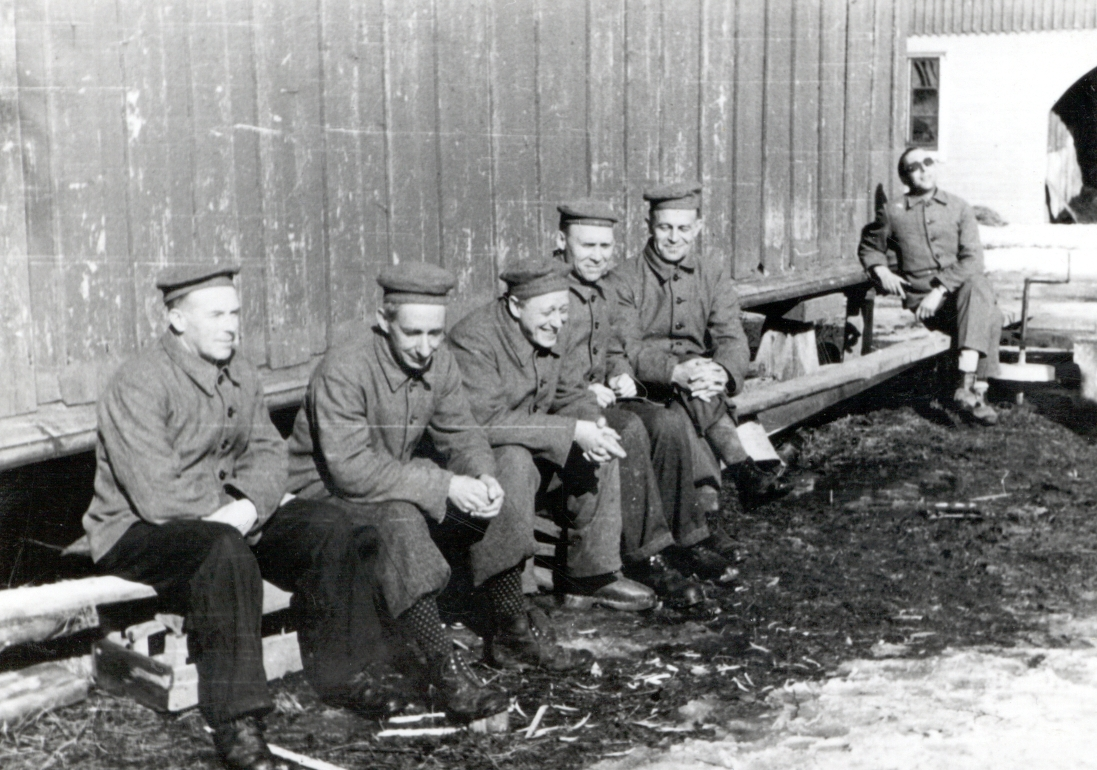
Tambs Lyche (second from the left) with a group of fellow prisoners at Falstad in 1942

He was a member of the Royal Norwegian Society of Sciences and Letters from 1927, and of the Norwegian Academy of Science and Letters from 1929. From 1946 to 1950 he was the secretary-general of the Royal Norwegian Society of Sciences and Letters, and he chaired the Norwegian Mathematical Society from 1953 to 1959 and the Norwegian Botanical Society from 1957 to 1959. He chaired the Student Society in Trondheim in 1920, and later held speeches during political meetings there. He was a member of Clarté, affiliated with Mot Dag. He denounced communism after the Molotov–Ribbentrop Pact of 1939. During the martial law in Trondheim in 1942, organized by the occupying Nazi authorities, he was imprisoned at Falstad concentration camp. He was one of the first prisoners there; he had the prisoner number 53. He avoided execution unlike some others who were arrested during martial law, but he remained imprisoned from 9 March 1942 to 3 August 1943.

Ralph Tambs Lyche was the father of solidarity activist Guri Tambs Lyche. His wife Elsa was a pioneer in maternal hygiene work. He died in January 1991, at the age of 100.
