= Antonella Zanna =

Italian applied mathematician

Antonella Munthe-Kaas Zanna is an Italian applied mathematician and numerical analyst whose research includes work on numerical integration of differential equations and applications to medical imaging. She is a professor and head of the mathematics department at the University of Bergen in Norway.

== Education ==
Zanna was born in Molfetta, in southern Italy, and earned a degree in mathematics from the University of Bari. She completed her PhD in the Department of Applied Mathematics and Theoretical Physics at the University of Cambridge in 1998. Her dissertation, Numerical Solution of Isospectral Flows, was supervised by Arieh Iserles.

== Recognition ==
Zanna won the Second Prize in the Leslie Fox Prize for Numerical Analysis in 1997. She is a member of the Norwegian Academy of Technological Sciences.

== Personal life ==
Zanna married to Norwegian mathematician Hans Munthe-Kaas in 1997; they have four children.
