= Olaf Huseby =

Norwegian-American bookseller and publisher (1856–1942)

Olaf Huseby (December 12, 1856–October 3, 1942) was a Norwegian-American bookseller and publisher.

== Biography ==
Olaf Antunson Huseby was born in Leikanger Municipality in Nordre Bergenhus amt, Norway. He was the oldest of five siblings. He studied art in Germany and England from 1881 to 1883. In 1883, he founded the bookstore Olaf Huseby & Olaf Olsen Boghandel jointly with Olaf Norli in Kristiania (now Oslo). The collaboration eventually failed and two split in 1890. Olaf Norlis started Olaf Norlis Bokhandel and Olaf Norlis Forlag which combined a bookstore with a publishing house.

Huseby next ran his own firm Huseby & Co in cooperation with Johan Sørensen. The company published books such as Skram's novel Constance Ring, Krohg's confiscated novel Albertine, and the periodicals Nyt Tidsskrift and Kringsjaa.

In 1903, Huseby emigrated to America with his family. He established the Olaf Huseby Publishing House in Minneapolis, Minnesota which remained active from 1904-1935. In retirement, Olaf Huseby and his wife Ingeborg Skjegstad Huseby (1861-1942), established their home in Hillsdale, Michigan. He died during 1942 and was buried at Lake View Cemetery.

== Related Reading ==
- Overland, Orm (1996) The Western Home: A Literary History of Norwegian America (University of Illinois Press) ISBN 9780252023279
