= Kringsjaa =

Norwegian periodical (1893–1910)

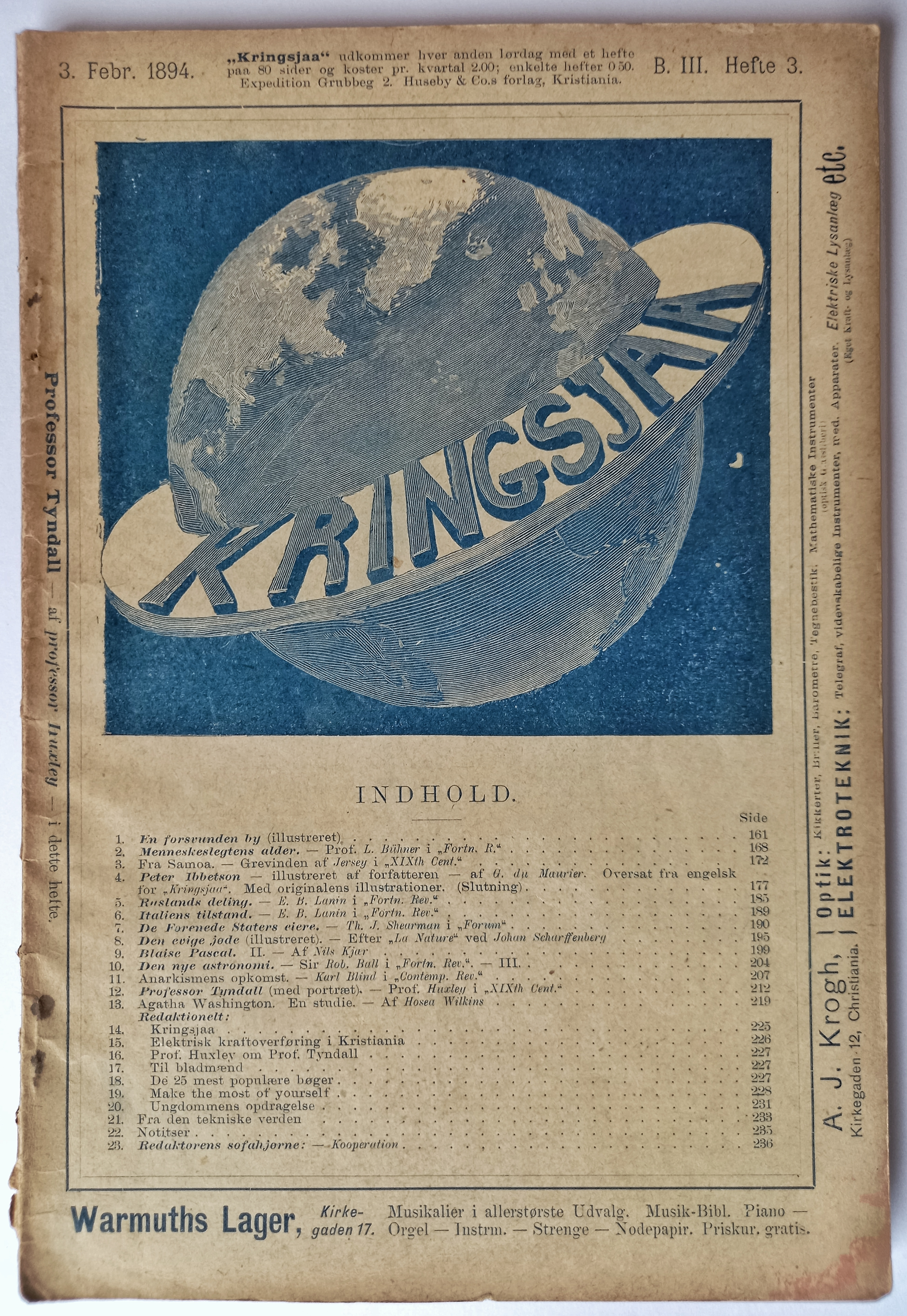
- Front page of a number of the periodical Kringsjaa from february 3rd 1894.
- Founder: Hans Tambs Lyche and Olaf Huseby
- Founded: 1893
- First issue: February 4, 1893; 133 years ago
- Final issue: July 29, 1910; 115 years ago
- Country: Norway
- Based in: Kristiania
- Language: Norwegian

Kringsjaa (Outlook) was a periodical which was published every two weeks from 1893 to 1910 (once a month from July 1905 to 1909). It was published by Olaf Norlis forlag in Kristiania. The magazine was around 80–100 pages, and was based on subscription. The publishers also bound the issues into bindings of 10 issues.

Kringsjaa was founded in 1893 when Unitarian Hans Tambs Lyche (1859–1898) returned from America, and was editor until 1898. Contributing editor from 1898 to 1910 was Christopher Brinchmann. Vilhelm Krag and Alf Harbitz were involved as well. In 1910 Kringsjaa was bought by the author and advocate of Nynorsk, Marta Steinsvik, who had been secretary of the magazine since 1895. She wanted to bring the Nynorsk language form into Kringsjaa together with the Dano-Norwegian mix which had until then been prevalent. It became clear in the meantime that there was not enough money to be made from this, and the paper folded in the same year.

Kringsjaa contained a wide range of topics. There were articles on popular science, politics, culture, religion, and editorials. Many of the articles were illustrated with photographs or drawings. A large section of the paper was taken up with articles from foreign newspapers, but the editor also provided a large amount of original content.

Kringsjaa can be read at the National Library in Oslo and at the Internet Archive.
