= Kristian Seip =

Norwegian mathematician (born 1962)

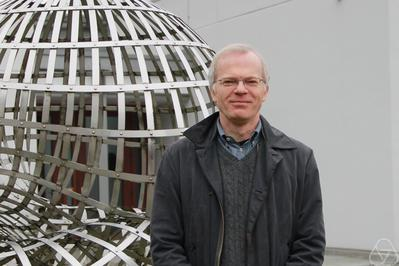
- Born: 24 June 1962; Norway
- Citizenship: Norwegian
- Occupation: mathematician

Kristian Seip (born 24 June 1962) is a Norwegian mathematician.

He obtained his doctor's degree at the Norwegian Institute of Technology in 1988, and became a professor in 1994. The Norwegian Institute of Technology was renamed into the Norwegian University of Science and Technology in 1996. He was an invited speaker at the International Congress of Mathematicians in Berlin in 1998. Seip was among the editorial staff for the journal Acta Mathematica from 2003 to 2012 and is an editor of Journal of Functional Analysis since 2016.

Seip chaired the Norwegian Mathematical Society from 2003 to 2007 and the committee that awards the Abel Prize from 2007 to 2010. He is a member of the Norwegian Academy of Science and Letters. In 2012 he became a fellow of the American Mathematical Society.
