= Hans Munthe-Kaas =

Norwegian mathematician

Hans Zanna Munthe-Kaas
- Born: 28 March 1961 (age 65); Northallerton, England
- Education: Norwegian University of Science and Technology
- Scientific career
- Fields: Mathematics
- Workplaces: University of Bergen, Norway and UiT The Arctic University of Norway, in Tromsø
- Doctoral advisor: Syvert Paul Nørsett and Jan Ole Aasen
- Website: hans.munthe-kaas.no

Hans Zanna Munthe-Kaas (born 28 March 1961) is a Norwegian mathematician working at UiT The Arctic University of Norway and the University of Bergen. The main focus of is work lies in the area of computational mathematics in the borderland between pure and applied mathematics and computer science.

He took his PhD at the Norwegian Institute of Technology in 1989, called to full Professor 1997 and has since 2005 been Professor of Mathematics. Since 2021 he is mainly working at UiT The Arctic University of Norway in Tromsø where he is co-director of the newly established Lie-Størmer Center for fundamental structures in computational and pure mathematics.

== Research ==
The work of Munthe-Kaas is centred on applications of differential geometry and Lie group techniques in geometric integration and structure preserving algorithms for numerical integration of differential equations. A central aspect is the analysis of structure preservation by algebraic and combinatorial techniques (B-series and Lie–Butcher series).

In the mid-1990s Munthe-Kaas developed what are now known as Runge–Kutta–Munthe-Kaas methods, a generalisation of Runge–Kutta methods to integration of differential equations evolving on Lie groups. The analysis of numerical Lie group integrators leads to the study of new types of formal power series for flows on manifolds (Lie–Butcher series). Lie–Butcher theory combines classical B-series with Lie-series.

== Honors and awards ==
Munthe-Kaas received Exxon Mobil Award for best PhD at NTNU, 1989, and the Carl-Erik Frōberg Prize in Numerical Mathematics 1996 for the paper "Lie–Butcher theory for Runge–Kutta Methods". Munthe-Kaas is elected member of Academia Europaea, the Norwegian Academy of Science and Letters, the Royal Norwegian Society of Sciences and Letters and the Norwegian Academy of Technological Sciences. Munthe-Kaas was the chair of the international Abel Prize committee (2018–2022), he was President of the Scientific Council of Centre International de Mathématiques Pures et Appliquées (CIMPA) (2017–2024) and he was Editor-in-Chief of Journal Foundations of Computational Mathematics (2017–2022). Munthe-Kaas was secretary of Foundations of Computational Mathematics (2005–2011) and member of the Board of the Abel Prize in Mathematics (2010–2018).

== Personal life ==
Munthe-Kaas married Antonella Zanna, an Italian numerical analyst, in 1997; they have four children.
