= Olaf Norli =

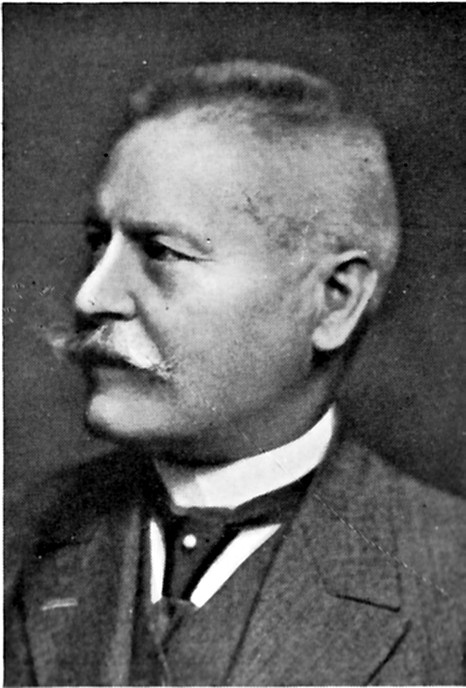
Olaf Norli

Olaf Olsen Norli (18 August 1861 – 21 January 1959) was a Norwegian bookseller and publisher.

== Biography ==
He was born in Kristiania (now Oslo), Norway. He grew up at Nordlia on Sjursøya. In 1877 he started as an apprentice in Jacob Dybwad's bookstore. In 1883, he founded the bookstore Olaf Huseby & Olaf Olsen Boghandel together with Olaf Huseby. The collaboration eventually failed and the two split.

In 1890, he started Olaf Norlis Bokhandel and Olaf Norlis Forlag which combined a bookstore with a publishing house. Peter Egge and Tryggve Andersen both debuted their work at Norlis. Tarjei Vesaas debuted at Norli in 1923, but later went over to the publishing house Gyldendal. Johan Bojer and Hjalmar Christensen also wrote published works before moving to a larger publisher. Nils Collett Vogt published three poetry collections at Norli. Vetle Vislie, Olav Duun, Hans Seland, Anders Hovden, Rasmus Løland, Jens Tvedt and Tore Ørjasæter all published with Norlis.

Olaf Norli was known for publishing several titles in Nynorsk, and published the magazine Frå bygd og by between 1913 and 1932. He chaired the Norwegian Booksellers Association from 1924 to 1927. In 1948, when Olaf Norli was 87 years old, he left the firm to two trusted employees. Bjarne Welle (1878–1949) took over the bookshop and Knut Stalsberg (1888–1980) led the publishing. In 1959 Johan Grundt Tanum Forlag (established 1933) acquired the company. The bookshop was taken over by Aschehoug in 1985. The name resurfaced around 2000, when Norli Gruppen AS was established.
