= Johan Sørensen (businessman) =

Norwegian businessman (1830–1918)

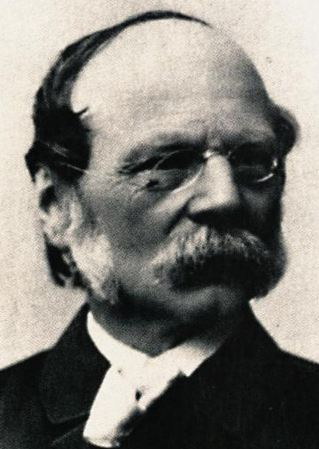
portrait of Johan Sørensen

Johan Jean Christian Sørensen (21 November 1830 – 1 October 1918) was a Norwegian businessperson and book publisher who had been at one time Danish consul to Spain.

== Biography ==
He was born in Drøbak in Akershus, Norway. He was a son of shipmaster, merchant and lighthouse manager Abraham Georg Sørensen and Nancy Samuelson. He was a brother of Niels Georg Sørensen. The family moved to Lindesnes in 1842. He worked at sea from the age of thirteen, but in 1844 he moved with the family to Hustadvika when his father became manager of Kvitholmen Lighthouse. At the age of seventeen Sørensen became a shop clerk in Kristiansund. In 1868 he married German citizen Anna Henriette Dick (1843–1921).

Sørensen moved to Spain in 1857 to trade dried and salted cod. His company was located in Santander, and soon expanded to include timber trade. In 1862 a branch office was opened in Bilbao, where a mechanical workshop was also established. From 1867 to 1871 he was the consul for Denmark in Spain. He gradually relocated his business to Sweden, where he established a sawmill Säfveåns AB in Gothenburg with his brothers during 1874. In 1880 he moved back to Norway, residing at the property Fagerstrand near Høvik. His interests in the companies in Spain and Sweden was gradually discontinued, but the companies were still run by others.

Sørensen had received education through private tutoring in Kristiansund, where he also used the library at his workplace. He became a part of the liberal movement, and became active in culture and society in the 1880s. In 1884 he replaced Olaf Norli as a partner of Olaf Huseby in the book store and publishing house Huseby & Co. Among their publications were books such as Albertine by Christian Krohg, which was confiscated by the police. They also published the periodical Nyt Tidsskrift, edited by Olaf Skavlan and Ernst Sars.

Sørensen was the first publisher of cheap books for the mass market in Norway. In 1887 he established his own publishing house, Bibliothek for de tusen hjems forlag, where the goal was to mass-produce intellectual and political works for ordinary people, in a series called Bibliothek for de tusen hjem. The first book in the series was Bjørnson's story Støv. In addition to liberal Norwegian writers, the series would contain authors such as Charles Darwin, Thomas Huxley, Herbert Spencer, Thomas Carlyle, Charles Dickens, Émile Zola and Alphonse Daudet. In seven years, Sørensen published 130 books in a circulation of about 600,000 copies. He has thus been credited for bringing European ideas such as positivism and evolutionism to the peripheral nation Norway.

Sørensen sold his publishing house in 1895. He had struggled with asthma, and stayed at two sanatoriums in Sør-Fron, Tofte, and in the Lauvåsen neighborhood of Kristiansand. He died at Tofte Sanatorium in October 1918.
