= Arnfinn Laudal =

Norwegian mathematician

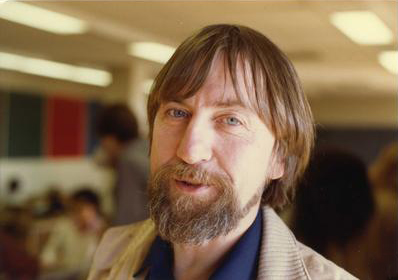
Arnfinn Laudal

Olav Arnfinn Laudal (born 19 June 1936) is a Norwegian mathematician.

== Early life and education ==
O.A. Laudal was born in Kirkenes as the son of teachers Trygve Laudal (1896–1964) and Agnes Mønnesland (1898–1982). He finished his secondary education in 1954 in Mandal, and enrolled in the University of Oslo in the same year.

He studied at École Normale Supérieure from 1957, but in 1958 he was back in Oslo and took the cand.real. degree.

== Mathematical career ==
Laudal was a research fellow at Columbia University and Institut Henri Poincaré between 1959 and 1962. He was appointed as lecturer at the University of Oslo in 1962, was promoted to docent in 1964 and was a professor from 1985 to 2003. His most notable book is 1979's Formal Moduli of Algebraic Structures. He was among the founders of the Abel Prize, and has been involved in the International Centre for Theoretical Physics.

== Organizational memberships ==
Laudal is a member of the Norwegian Academy of Science and Letters.

He has been a deputy member of Bærum municipal council for the Socialist Left Party.
