= Christopher Brinchmann =

Norwegian archivist, literary historian and critic

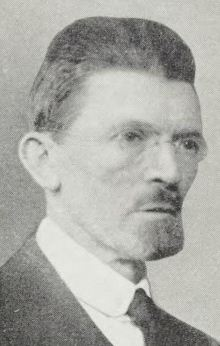
Christopher Brinchmann

Christopher Brinchmann (1 April 1864 – 26 February 1940) was a Norwegian archivist, literary historian and critic.

He was born at Leka Municipality in Nord-Trøndelag county, Norway. He worked in the National Archival Services of Norway (Riksarkivet) from 1896, and was deputy director from 1922 to 1934. He was among the publishers of Diplomatarium Norvegicum. Among his own works were Nationalforskeren P. A. Munch; hans liv og virke (1910), Grønlands overgang til Danmark (1922), Norske kongesigiller (1924) and Norges arkivsaker i Danmark (1927). He also edited the periodical Kringsjaa, from 1898 to 1907.
