= Guri Tambs-Lyche =

Guri Tambs-Lyche (20 September 1917 – 13 March 2008) was a Norwegian activist for international solidarity and women's rights.

== Biography ==
She was born in Trondheim as a daughter of Ralph Tambs-Lyche (1890–1991) and Else Alvilde Rasmussen (1896–1966). Her father was a mathematician and Mot Dag affiliate, and from an early age Guri Tambs-Lyche was influenced by her father's speeches in the Student Society in Trondheim. Her mother was a pioneer in maternal hygiene work. Her father later became a professor.

She studied technical drawing at the Norwegian National Academy of Craft and Art Industry, and joined the Workers' Youth League while studying. During the occupation of Norway by Nazi Germany she was a member of the resistance movement, as was her husband Wilhelm. Her job was to distribute illegal newspapers. After the war she first joined the Communist Party of Norway, and wrote in Friheten, but she was excluded in the aftermath of the Peder Furubotn case.

In 1948 she was a co-founder of Norges Demokratiske Kvinneforbund. In 1954 the organization became a part of Norsk Kvinneforbund. She was on the editorial board of their magazine Kvinner hjemme og ute, later named Kvinner i tiden, and was editor-in-chief for a time. She also participated on international women's congresses. After the death of her husband she lived in Sweden for seven years, then in Norway again where she rejoined the Communist Party. After the disbanding of Norsk Kvinneforbund, she became a prominent member in the national branch of the Women's International League for Peace and Freedom. She lived in Lund, Sweden for the last two years of her life, and died her home in March 2008.

== See also ==
- List of peace activists
