= Poul Heegaard =

Danish mathematician (1871–1948)

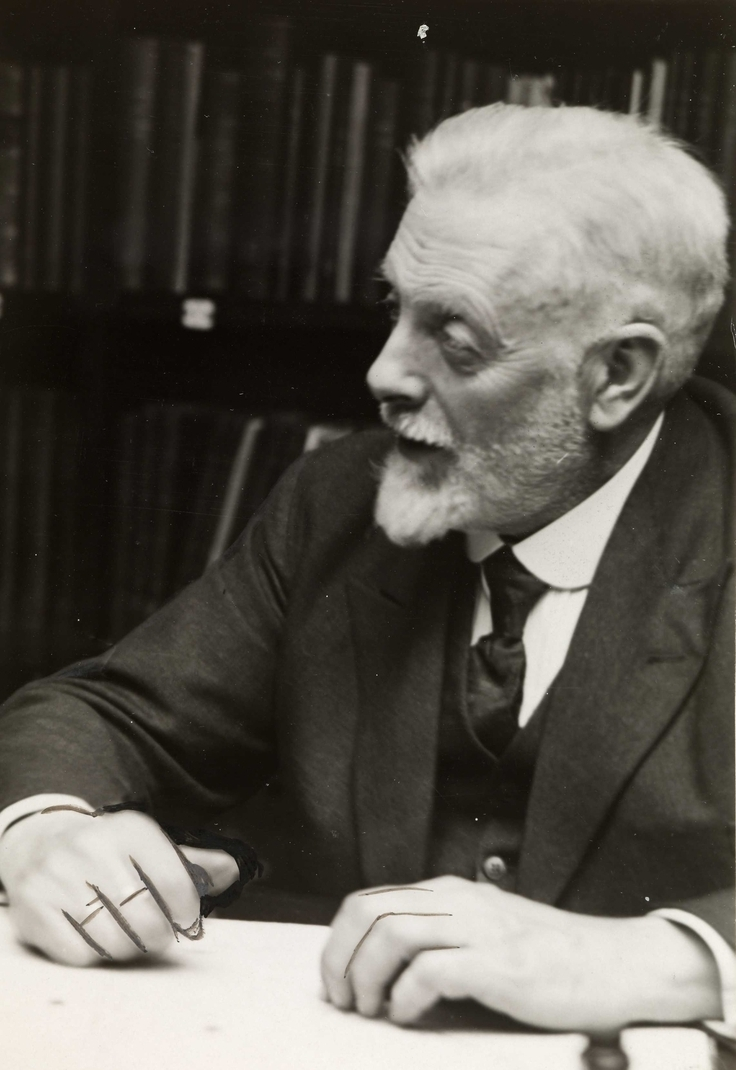
- Poul Heegaard, ca. 1940
- Born: 2 November 1871; Copenhagen
- Died: 7 February 1948 (aged 76); Oslo
- Education: University of Copenhagen
- Scientific career
- Fields: Topology
- Workplaces: University of Copenhagen, University of Oslo
- Thesis: Forstudier til en topologisk Teori for de algebraiske Fladers Sammenhæng (1898)

Poul Heegaard (Danish: [ˈhe̝ˀˌkɒˀ]; November 2, 1871, Copenhagen - February 7, 1948, Oslo) was a Danish mathematician active in the field of topology. His 1898 thesis introduced a concept now called the Heegaard splitting of a 3-manifold. Heegaard's ideas allowed him to make a careful critique of work of Henri Poincaré. Poincaré had overlooked the possibility of the appearance of torsion in the homology groups of a space.

He later co-authored, with Max Dehn, a foundational article on combinatorial topology, in the form of an encyclopedia entry.

Heegaard studied mathematics at the University of Copenhagen from 1889 to 1893. Following years of travelling, and teaching mathematics, he was appointed professor at University of Copenhagen in 1910. An English translation of his 1898 thesis, which laid a rigorous topological foundation for modern knot theory, may be found at https://www.maths.ed.ac.uk/~v1ranick/papers/heegaardenglish.pdf. The section on "a visually transparent representation of the complex points of an algebraic surface" is especially important.

Following a dispute with the faculty over, among other things, the hiring of Harald Bohr as professor at the University (which Heegaard opposed); Heegaard accepted a professorship at Oslo in Norway, where he worked till his retirement in 1941.
