= Axel Sophus Guldberg =

Norwegian mathematician (1838–1913)

- Born: 2 January 1838; Christiania, Norway
- Died: 28 February 1913 (aged 75); Aker, Norway
- Spouse: Kathinka Fredrikke Marie Borchsenius
- Children: Alf Victor Guldberg
- Parents: Carl August Guldberg (father); Hanna Sophie Theresia Bull (mother)
- Relatives: Cato Maximilian Guldberg; Cathinka Guldberg; Hans Riddervold Guldberg; Carl Johan Guldberg; Fredrik Oscar Guldberg; Gustav Adolph Guldberg; Ansgar Guldberg
- Awards: Order of St. Olav (Knight 1st Class)
- Scientific career
- Fields: Mathematics
- Workplaces: Norwegian Military Academy; Norwegian Academy of Science and Letters; Royal Norwegian Society of Sciences and Letters

Axel Sophus Guldberg (2 November 1838 – 28 February 1913) was a Norwegian mathematician.

== Biography ==
Born in Christiania (now called Oslo), Guldberg was the second oldest out of 11 siblings. He and his siblings were initially homeschooled, but he and his older brother, Cato Maximilian Guldberg, later began going to school in Fredrikstad, where they lived together with relatives. He completed his examen artium in 1856, cand.real. in 1863 and dr.philos. in 1867.

In 1863, he was an adjunct professor in Drammen. From 1864 to 1865, he studied mathematics in Germany and France, while simultaneously on his honeymoon. In 1865, Guldberg became a rector in Stavanger. The same year, he began teaching mathematics at the Norwegian Military Academy until 1899.

He was an important figure in the insurance industry. He also served in the Norwegian law commission.

In 1866, he had a son, Alf Victor Guldberg, with his wife, Fredrikke Borchsenius.
