= Hilde C. Bjørnland =

Norwegian professor of economics

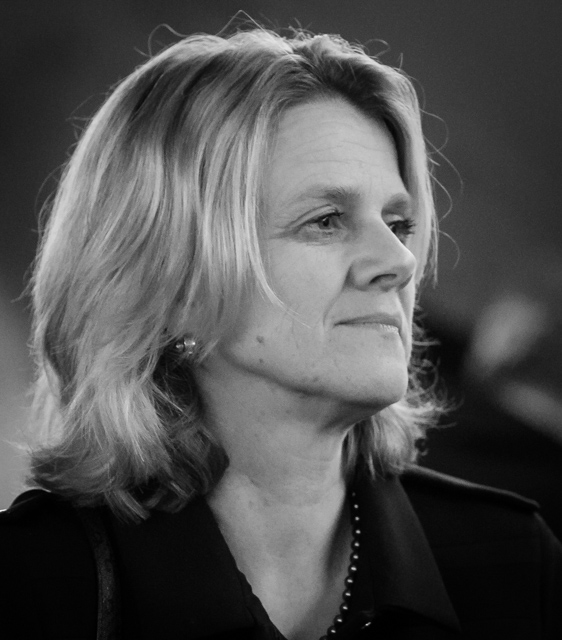
- Born: 3 January 1966 (age 60)

Academic background
- Education: University of Oslo; London School of Economics and Political Science

Academic work
- Discipline: International economics International finance
- Institutions: BI Norwegian Business School

Hilde Christiane Bjørnland (born January 3, 1966) is a Norwegian economist. She is a professor of economics and Provost for Research and Academic Resources at BI Norwegian Business School.

== Education ==
Bjørnland earned a B.Sc. in economics from Heriot-Watt University in 1991, an M.Sc. in Econometrics and Mathematical Economics from the London School of Economics and Political Science in 1992, and a Ph.D. from the University of Oslo in 1998.

== Career ==
Bjørnland won a HM Kings gold medal for her doctoral dissertation in 1999. She is the special adviser to the Research Department of Norges Bank, the director at the Centre for Applied Macroeconomics and commodity Prices (CAMP), the president of the Society for Non-linear Dynamics and Econometrics (SNDE), and has previously served on the board of directors of the Norwegian FSA and the Swedish Fiscal Council. She also worked as a staff economist at the IMF, and has served as a visiting scholar at the University of California, Berkeley and the University of California, Riverside.

=== Academic contributions ===
Bjørnland conducts research in applied macroeconomics and time series, focusing among others on the validity of the Dutch Disease in the Norwegian economy. Special interests include the study of natural resources, business cycles, monetary and fiscal policy, and the impact of monetary policy on house prices.
