= Nyt Tidsskrift =

Former Norwegian periodical

Nyt Tidsskrift is a former Norwegian literary, cultural and political periodical issued from 1882 to 1887, and with a second series from 1892 to 1895. The periodical had contributions from several of the leading intellectuals of the time, including later Nobel Prize in Literature laureate Bjørnstjerne Bjørnson, later Nobel Peace Prize laureate Fredrik Bajer, the writers Alexander L. Kielland, Jonas Lie, Arne Garborg and Hans Aanrud, proponents for women's rights Camilla Collett, Gina Krog and Hagbard Emanuel Berner, and painter Erik Werenskiold.

== The first years, 1882–1887 ==
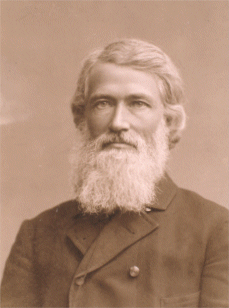
Ernst Sars.

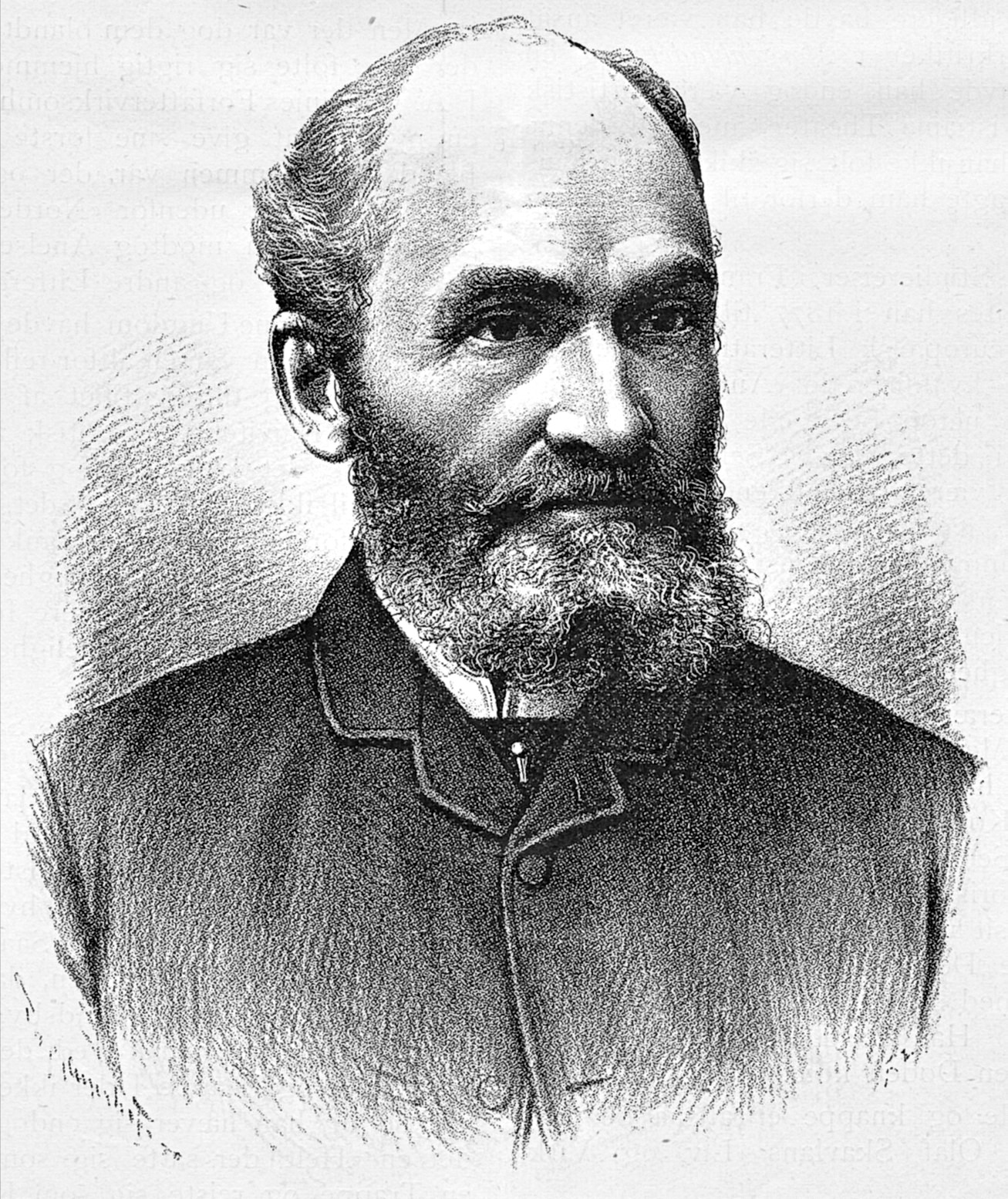
Olaf Skavlan.

From 1882 to 1887 the periodical was edited by literary historian Olaf Skavlan and historian Ernst Sars. It was published by Huseby & Co, which was owned by Olaf Huseby and Johan Sørensen.

=== 1882 ===
The very first issue in 1882 started by publishing the short story "Støv" (English: Dust) by Bjørnstjerne Bjørnson. Geologist and politician Amund Helland started an article series on Iceland, including a description of the eruptions in 1875. Arne Løchen's monography "Om den udvikling Ibsens moralske grundanskuelse har gjennemgaaet" is regarded to be valuable for later researchers. Mathilde Schjøtt contributed with literary critics, and published the play Rosen anonymously. Peter Schjøtt published a review on Ibsen's play Gengangere. The editors Skavlan and Sars had several contributions in 1882. Other contributors in 1882 were Erik Werenskiold, Camilla Collett, Marie Colban and Holger Drachmann. Alexander L. Kielland published the short story "Karen", and Jonas Lie published the poem "Ballade" and the short story "Slagter-Tobias". Amalie Müller (later Amalie Skram) published her first literary work, the short story "Madam Høiers leiefolk". Arne Garborg wrote reviews of Kielland's novel Skipper Worse and of Ibsen's play En Folkefiende.

=== 1883 ===
The first chapter of Kielland's novel Gift was published in Nyt Tidsskrift in 1883. Jonas Lie published the first part of his story "Et interiør fra firtiaarene". Camilla Collett contributed with the essay "Paa gamle tomter". Kristofer Janson wrote an article on Minneapolis, where he had settled. Gerhard Gran wrote a biographical article on the French writer Émile Zola. There were philosophical essays on the Osiris myth, on darwinism, and on Lao–Tsze. Garborg wrote a review of Heuch's lecture collection on infidelity, Vantroens væsen. Magdalene Thoresen wrote a travelogue from Nordland and Finnmark. Sigurd Ibsen wrote an essay on the development of the concept of State over time, Kristofer Randers published songs, and Lars Holst wrote a review of Lie's novel Livsslaven. Other contributors were Henrik Jæger and Matias Skard.

=== 1884 ===
In 1884 the periodical had a series of articles on women's rights by Hagbard Emanuel Berner and Gina Krog. Berner's series "Om kvindesagen" dealt with issues such as girls' schools and suffragettism. Krog's article series was called "Nogle ord om kvindesagens utvikling og nærmeste opgaver i vort land", on the development of feminism. Fredrik Bajer continued his series on voting, "Vælgernes retfærdigste repræsentation". The periodical had reviews on Ibsen's play Vildanden and on Kielland's novel Fortuna. Later children's writer Dikken Zwilgmeyer published her first story (under pseudonym), "En hverdagshistorie".

=== 1885 ===
In 1885 the periodical published Per Sivle's short story "Berre ein hund". The story is written in landsmål coloured with the dialect from Voss, and was Sivle's breakthrough story. It was later included in his collection Sogor, published in 1887. The literary articles included a biographical article on Strindberg, a linguistic analysis of Ibsen's works, and reviews of recent books. The periodical covered art exhibitions and the theatre season at Christiania Theater. The debate on feminism continued, and the periodical had political essays on the parliamentary elections, the union between Sweden and Norway, and communistic societies of the United States. Articles on biology covered themes such as the bacteria and the brain.

=== 1886 ===
In 1886 the periodical had articles on natural sciences (biology), and there was a debate on freedom of press, sparked by the confiscation of Hans Jæger's novel Fra Kristianiabohêmen. Sivle published the short-story "Han Fanta-Nils". On theatre, Irgens-Hansen wrote a review of the season at Kristiania theater, and Camilla Collett wrote an essay on Dumas' comedy Le supplice d'une femme. Essays by James Sully, Prince Kropotkin and Émile de Laveleye were translated from the periodical Nineteenth Century.

== The second series, 1892–1895 ==
Among the editors of Nyt Tidsskrift from 1892 were Sars, Arne Løchen, Sigurd Ibsen and Christen Collin. The periodical was now published by Johan Sørensen's publishing house Bibliothek for de tusen hjems forlag.
