= Berit Stensønes =

Norwegian author and mathematician (1956–2022)

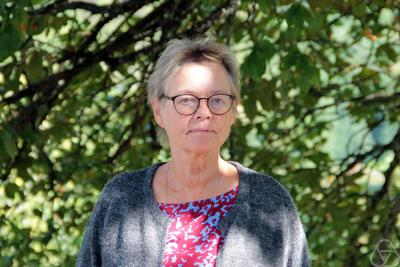
Stensønes at Oberwolfach, 2018

Berit Stensønes (19 February 1956 – 5 June 2022) was a mathematician and author from Norway that specialized in complex analysis and complex dynamics and recognized for her contributions to several complex variables. She taught both science and mathematics at the Norwegian University of Science and Technology (NTNU), and a professor emerita at the University of Michigan.

== Education ==
In 1985, Stensønes earned her Ph.D. at Princeton University. Her dissertation, Envelopes of Holomorphy, was supervised by John Erik Fornæss.

== Book ==
Lectures on Counterexamples in Several Complex Variables, written by Stensønes along with John Erik Fornaess, was published via AMS Chelsea Publishing, American Mathematical Society, 1987; it was reprinted in 2007.

== Recognition ==
Stensønes was a member of the Royal Norwegian Society of Sciences and Letters.
