= Bernt Michael Holmboe =

Norwegian mathematician

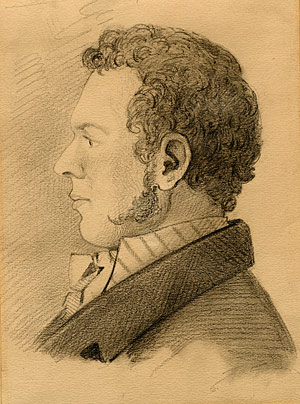
- Bernt Michael Holmboe
- Born: 23 March 1795; Vang, Norway
- Died: 28 March 1850 (aged 55); Christiania, Norway
- Education: Royal Frederick University (partly autodidact)
- Known for: Tutor of Niels Henrik Abel; Influential textbooks
- Scientific career
- Fields: Mathematics
- Workplaces: Christiania Cathedral School (1818–1826); Royal Frederick University (1826–1850)

Bernt Michael Holmboe (23 March 1795 – 28 March 1850) was a Norwegian mathematician. He was home-tutored from an early age, and was not enrolled in school until 1810. Following a short period at the Royal Frederick University, which included a stint as assistant to Christopher Hansteen, Holmboe was hired as a mathematics teacher at the Christiania Cathedral School in 1818, where he met the future renowned mathematician Niels Henrik Abel. Holmboe's lasting impact on mathematics worldwide has been said to be his tutoring of Abel, both in school and privately. The two became friends and remained so until Abel's early death. Holmboe moved to the Royal Frederick University in 1826, where he worked until his own death in 1850.

Holmboe's significant impact on mathematics in the fledgling Norway was his textbook in two volumes for secondary schools. It was widely used, but faced competition from Christopher Hansteen's alternative offering, sparking what may have been Norway's first debate about school textbooks.

== Early life and career ==
Bernt Michael Holmboe was born in Vang i Valdres in 1795, the son of vicar Jens Holmboe (1746–1823) and his wife Cathrine Holst (1763–1823). He grew up in Eidsberg with his nine siblings, and was the elder brother of noted philologist Christopher Andreas Holmboe. Holmboe was homeschooled from an early age, but was sent to the Christiania Cathedral School in 1810 to complete his secondary education. There he undertook extracurricular studies in mathematics. He enrolled as a student at the Royal Frederick University in 1814, a turbulent year in Norwegian history. Norway had been a province of Denmark since 1397, but had come under Swedish control in the January 1814 Treaty of Kiel. Following Norway's declaration of independence in the Constitution of 17 May, Sweden responded by waging a military campaign against Norway during the summer of 1814. Holmboe was a spokesperson for the student group opposed to the presence of Swedish troops in the country. Any outspokenness from the student community was highly visible at the time, as the university had only seventeen students as of 1813, its year of establishment.

As well as his private studies, Holmboe attended lectures given by Søren Rasmusen. In 1815 he was appointed to the position of scientific assistant under Christopher Hansteen, a lecturer at the university, and delivered some lectures himself. In early 1818, Holmboe became a mathematics teacher at the Christiania Cathedral School, a position that had become vacant in 1817. The school principal, Jacob Rosted, had invited Holmboe's brother, Christopher Andreas, who had also studied mathematics, to take up the position, but he had decided instead to concentrate on philology; Christopher went on to research the Sanskrit language among others. In his teaching, Holmboe drew inspiration from Joseph-Louis Lagrange.

=== Niels Henrik Abel ===
At the Christiania Cathedral School, Holmboe met Niels Henrik Abel, then a pupil there. Holmboe quickly discovered Abel's talent, and proclaimed him as a "splendid genius" in his report card. (Note: Quote: "Et udmerket mathematisk Genie." In English: "A splendid mathematical genius." (remark written by Holmboe)) The school's primary focus was on classical education and Latin, and so Holmboe tutored Abel privately. His personal support for Abel has been called "[Holmboe's] most important contribution to mathematics". (Note: Quote: "... måten Holmboe støttet og hjalp Abel på, må sies å være hans viktigste bidrag til matematikken." In English: "... the way Holmboe supported and helped Abel should be considered his most important contribution to mathematics." (statement of the article writer))

Holmboe and Abel became close friends. Two of Holmboe's younger brothers studied with Abel, and the three were also on friendly terms. Abel was invited to the Holmboe family residence in Eidsberg on several occasions, including to celebrate Christmas.

Abel died from tuberculosis in 1829, at the age of twenty-six. Ten years after Abel's death Holmboe edited and published his complete works in two volumes—Oeuvres complètes de N.H. Abel ('Complete Works of N.H. Abel'). He was the first to do so.

== Later life and career ==
Holmboe published his first textbook in mathematics in 1825. The 274-page book was named Lærebog i Mathematiken. Første Deel (Textbook in Mathematics. Part One). In 1827 he followed with the second volume, Lærebog i Mathematiken. Anden Deel (Textbook in Mathematics. Part Two), consisting of a further 155 pages. He used his own teaching experience as the background for his writing; mainly abstract, the purpose of the books was to instill logical thinking. For instance, in the field geometry, it enticed readers to envisage a figure instead of putting it to paper. The books became widely used, and were reprinted in four and five volumes respectively.

In 1826, Holmboe was appointed a lecturer at the Royal Frederick University. Some claimed that he owed his appointment to Abel's absence, as the latter was travelling around in Europe at that time. Holmboe also taught mathematics at a military college, from 1826 until his death, and was promoted to professor at the Royal Frederick University in 1834. His later publications include Stereometrie (Stereometry) (1833), Plan- og sfærisk Trigonometrie (Plan and Spherical Trigonometry) (1834), and Lærebog i den høiere Mathematik (Textbook of Advanced Mathematics) (1849). Holmboe was an influence on other mathematicians as well as Abel, including Ole Jacob Broch (born 1818).

At the university, Holmboe again met Christopher Hansteen, who had become a professor there in 1816. In 1835, Hansteen published his own mathematics textbook for secondary schools. A reaction to Holmboe's books and method of teaching, it was more practically oriented. Holmboe wrote a review of the book for the newspaper Morgenbladet, in which he advised schools not to use it. A public debate followed, with contributions from other mathematicians. It has been claimed that this was the first debate on the subject of school textbooks in Norway. Hansteen's textbook was not reprinted.

Holmboe also became involved in the field of insurance. From 1832 to 1848 he was a member of Tilsynskomiteen for private forsørgelses- og understøttelsesselskaper, the country's first public committee for the supervision of insurance companies. On the other side of the table, from 1847 Holmboe was a member of the board of directors of the insurance company Gjensidige, founded by his former student Ole Jacob Broch.

== Legacy ==
A Bernt Michael Holmboe Memorial Prize for teachers of mathematics was established in 2005, and is awarded annually. The prize money, NOK 50,000, are provided by the Abel Foundation, which awards the Abel Prize. The prize is administered by the board of the Norwegian Mathematical Society. The current board chairman is Tom Lindstrøm, professor at the University of Oslo.

A street at Majorstuen in Oslo, Holmboes gate, has been named after Bernt Michael Holmboe. Before 1879 it was named Hansteens gate, after Christopher Hansteen.

== Personal life ==
Holmboe married twice. He died in 1850.
