= Sigve Tjøtta =

Norwegian mathematician (born 1930)

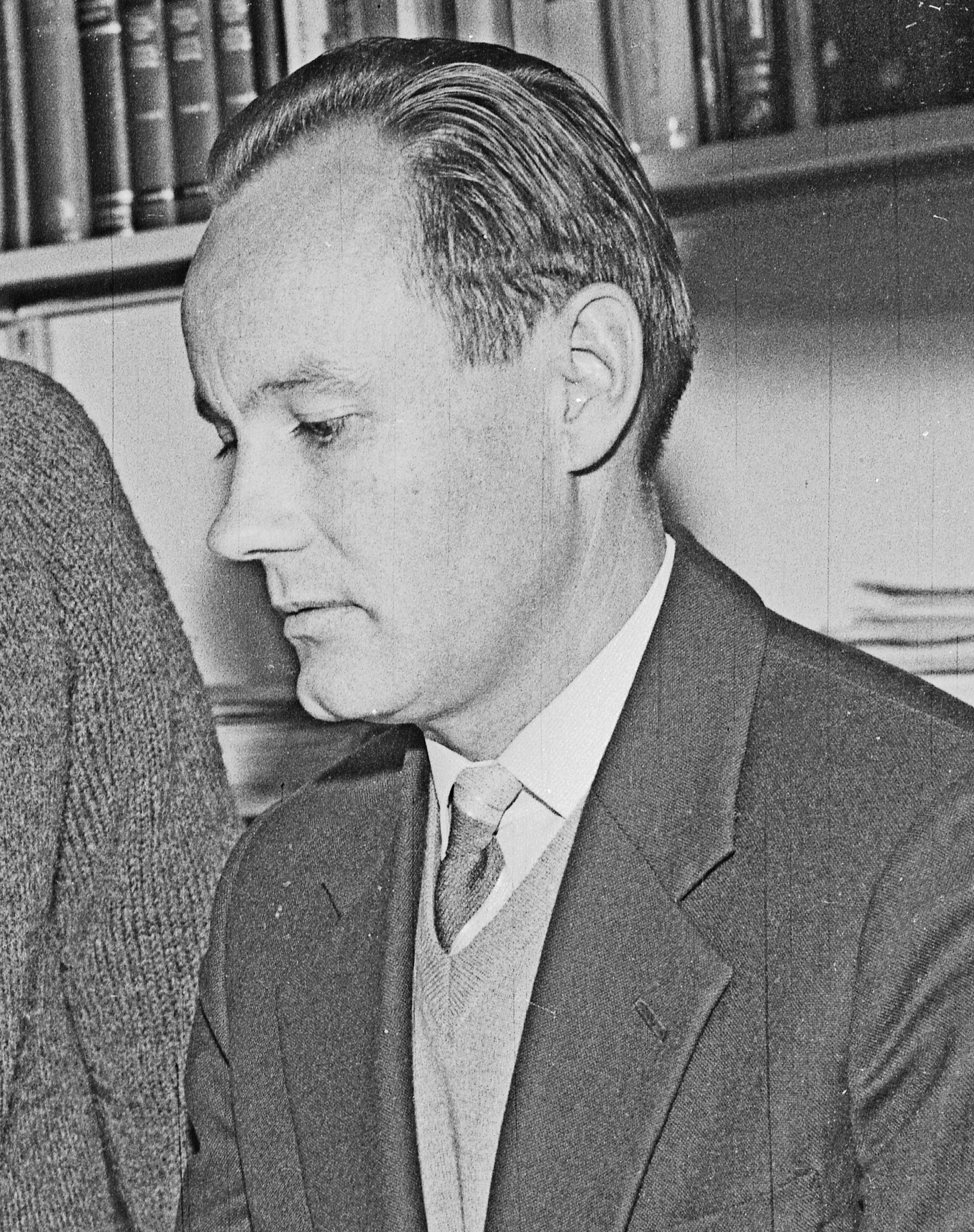
- Tjøtta in 1966
- Born: 1 March 1930; Klepp Municipality, Norway
- Died: 28 August 2023 (aged 93)
- Education: University of Oslo; Brown University; Max Planck Institute
- Occupation: Mathematician
- Spouse: Jacqueline Naze (m. 1964; died 2017)
- Scientific career
- Fields: Plasma, Nonlinear acoustics, Hydroacoustics, Acoustic streaming
- Workplaces: University of Bergen, University of Texas

Sigve Tjøtta (1 March 1930 – 28 August 2023) was a Norwegian mathematician.

== Early life ==
He was born in Klepp Municipality. He took the cand.real. degree in 1954 and the dr.philos. degree in 1960, both at the University of Oslo. His doctoral thesis was On Some Non-linear Effects in Sound Fields, with Special Emphasis on the Generation of Vorticity and the Formation of Streaming Patterns. He worked as a research assistant in Oslo from 1954 to 1956, 1957 to 1958 and 1959 to 1960. In between he studied at Brown University from 1956 to 1957 and at the Max Planck Institute. Among his advisors were Johan Peter Holtsmark.

== Career ==
He was appointed docent at the University of Bergen in 1960, and was promoted to professor in 1963. He succeeded Oddvar Bjørgum, and had responsibility for the university's education in applied mathematics. His fields of research include plasma, nonlinear acoustics, hydroacoustics and acoustic streaming. He was also the dean of the Faculty of Mathematics and Natural Sciences from 1975 to 1977, and has held positions in NAVF, NTVF, and in the national committee of the International Union of Theoretical and Applied Mechanics. He has also been a visiting scholar at the University of Texas.

== Personal life ==
Tjøtta married Jacqueline Naze, a colleague, in 1964—they barely survived a car crash sustained on their honeymoon. They have since done extensive research together. After retirement from the professor chair, the couple moved to Oslo.

Tjøtta's most prominent hobby is long-distance running. He discovered his talent during a stay in the United States, where jogging was popular. He ran the marathon in 3:17.02 hours at the age of 66, and the half marathon in 1:43.09 hours at the age of 75.

He died in August 2023, aged 93.

== Honors ==
Together with his wife, Tjøtta won a prize in underwater acoustics from the French Academy of Sciences. He is a fellow of the Acoustical Society of America, and a member of the Norwegian Academy of Science and Letters. In 2002 he was decorated as a Knight, First Class of the Royal Norwegian Order of St. Olav.
