= Norli (bookshop) =

Norwegian bookstore chain

Norli Libris AS
- Company type: Private
- Industry: Retail; Bookshop
- Founded: 1999
- Founder: Arild Lauritzen appointed after merger with Lauritzen Bokhandel and Aschehoug
- Headquarters: Oslo and Drammen, Norway
- Number of locations: Norli chain: 88 stores, Libris chain: 69 stores
- Area served: Norway
- Products: Books
- Revenue: 947.4 million NOK in 2014
- Owner: Aschehoug and NorgesGruppen
- Number of employees: 1,408 (2026)
- Website: www.norli.no

Norli Libris, is a Norwegian bookstore chain that owns both Norli and Libris book stores. Norli Libris owns bookstores in the Norli chain directly, while the Libris stores are mainly owned by individuals. Founded in 2000 as Norli Gruppen AS (renamed to Norli Group), later merging to become Norli Libris AS, it is one of the largest bookshop chains in Norway. One of Norli's bookshops in the city center of Oslo has around 60,000 different titles, making it one of the largest selections of books in Scandinavia. They sell books both in Norwegian and other languages.

== History ==
=== 1999-2009 ===
Norli Gruppen AS was formed in 1999 & 2000 by Lauritzen Bokhandel and Aschehoug merging their stores. The company was under the leadership of Arild Lauritzen. The company becomes the Lauritzen-Norli Group; this was later renamed to the Norli Group in 2001. Both founding companies had 50% ownership. Later on, Lauritzen-Norli bought many bookstores in Norway and also opened a large number of new stores which were mainly in shopping centers.

=== 2009–2010 ===
Up until 2009, Norli Group was owned half and half by Aschehoug & Co. and the Lauritzen family. Arild Lauritzen was the chairman until Q3 of 2008 when William Nygaard took over. This was due to very poor results and in 2008, there was a loss (before tax) of NOK 111 million. Norli was on the brink of collapse so Aschehoug paid NOK 60 million in new capital into the company. In January 2009, Aschehoug bought the Lauritzens' shares; the Norli Group was now fully owned by Aschehoug.

=== 2010–present ===
In October 2010, Aschehoug and NorgesGruppen decided to merge Norli Group with NorgesGruppen Bok og Papir AS. The bookstore Libris AS and Norli had ownership of the new company, Norli Libris AS. Norli Libris is owned 51 percent by Aschehoug and 49 percent by NorgesGruppen. Both companies would continue having their brands in their stores (Norli and Libris) but will be owned by Norli Libris AS.

On 1 January 2020, the decision was made to only use Norli as the brand name and subsequently, Libris stores will be rebranded to Norli.

== Stores ==
As of 2021, Norli operates 180 stores across Norway.

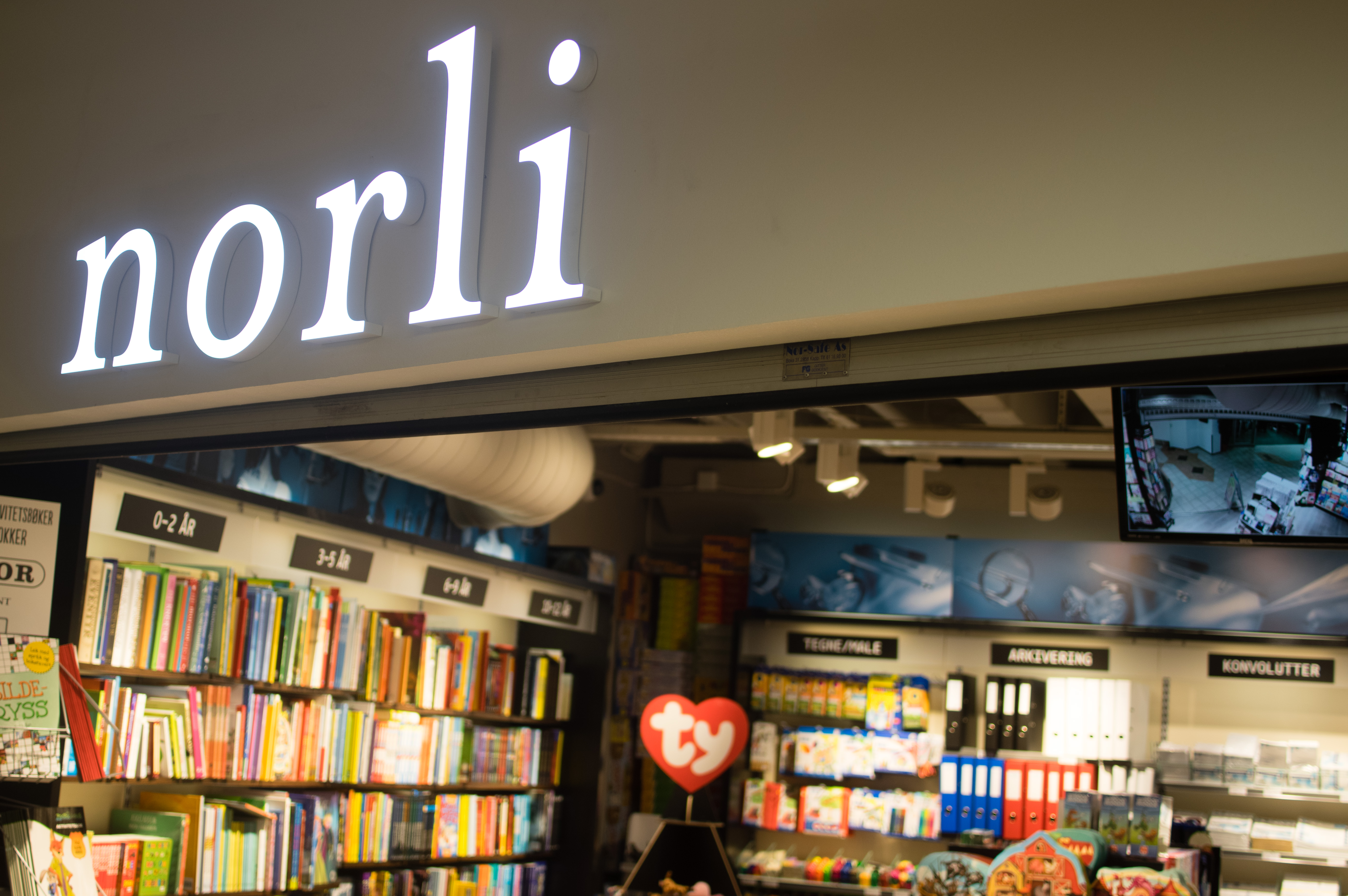
A typical Norli bookshop
