= Jacqueline Naze Tjøtta =

Norwegian mathematician and professor

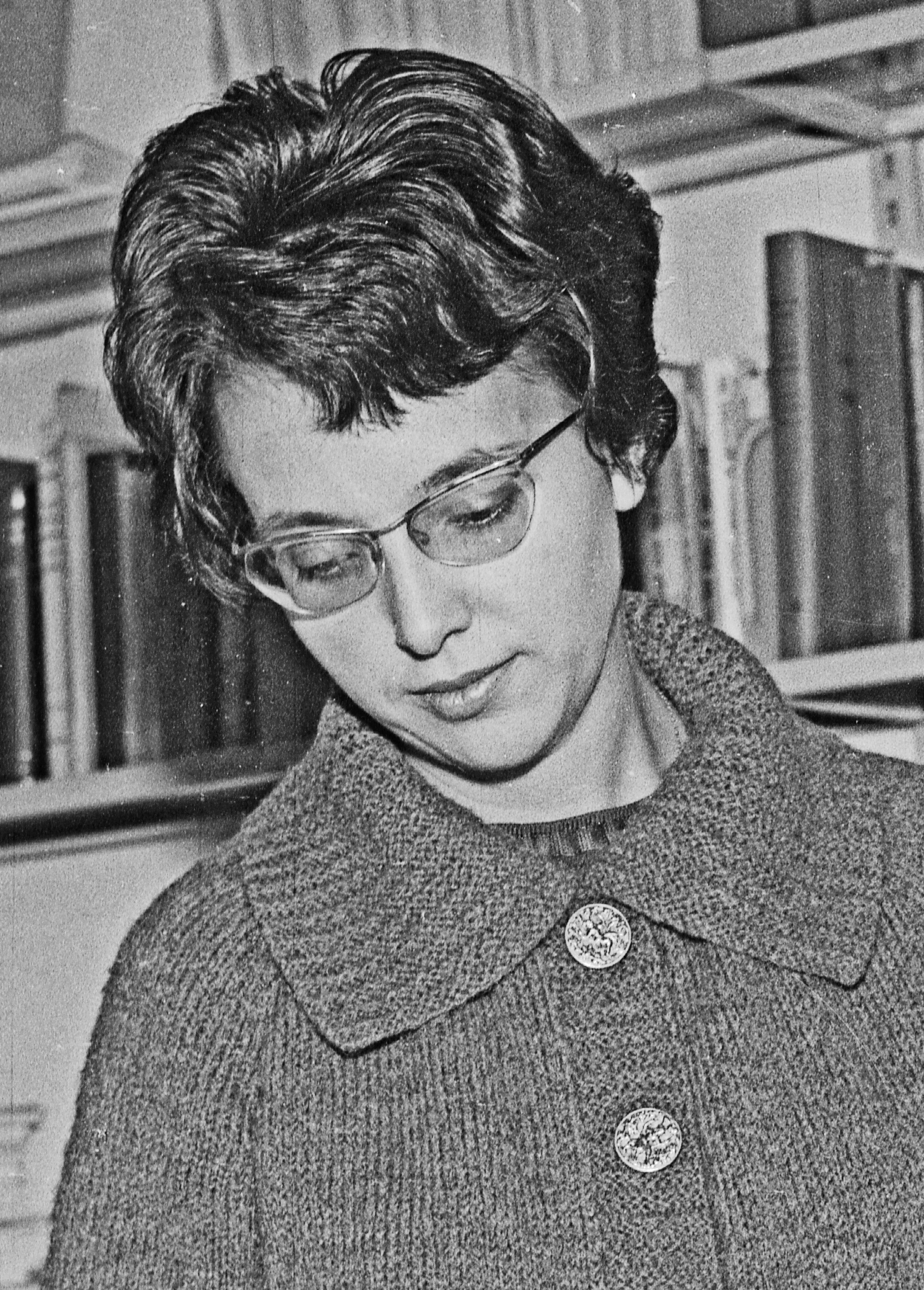
- Jacqueline Naze Tjøtta in 1966
- Born: 1 June 1935; Montpellier, France
- Died: 9 March 2017 (aged 81); Oslo, Norway
- Occupation: Mathematician
- Spouse: Sigve Tjøtta (m. 1964)

Jacqueline Andrée Naze Tjøtta (1 June 1935 – 9 March 2017) was a Norwegian mathematician who became the first female mathematical sciences professor in Norway.

Jacqueline Naze was born in Montpellier, France, to musician Maurize André Naze and Renée Marie Courbet. She graduated in mathematics from the Aix-Marseille University and the University of Paris. She married Norwegian mathematician Sigve Tjøtta in 1964. She was appointed professor in applied mathematics at the University of Bergen from 1966. Her research interests focused on kinetic theory, magnetohydrodynamics and theoretical acoustics.

She died in Oslo on 9 March 2017 at the age of 81.
