= John Erik Fornæss =

Norwegian-American author and mathematician

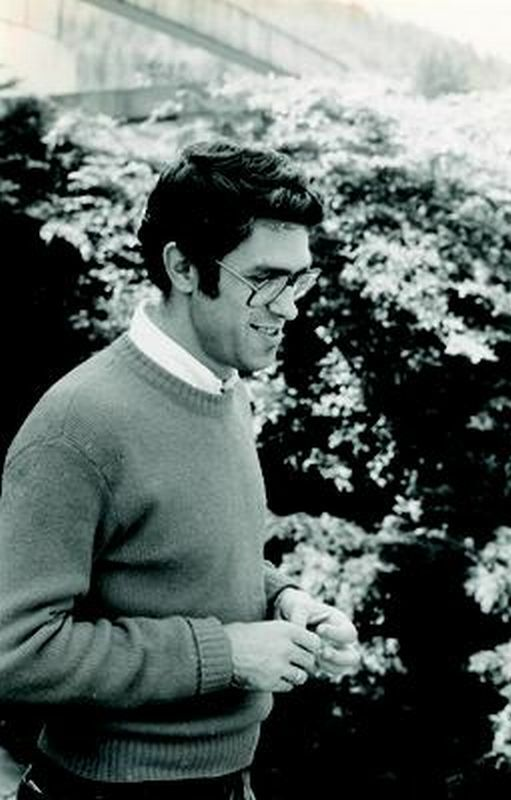
John Erik Fornæss

John Erik Fornæss (born 14 October 1946, Hamar, Norway) is a Norwegian-American mathematician and author. Fornæss earned his master's degree in 1970 from the University of Oslo with the thesis Uniform approximation on manifolds and earned his PhD in 1974 from the University of Washington under Edgar Lee Stout with thesis Embedding Strictly Pseudoconvex Domains in Convex Domains. At Princeton University in 1974, he became an instructor, assistant professor in 1976, associate professor in 1978, and a full professor in 1981. Since 1991, he has served as a professor at the University of Michigan.

He concentrates on the geometry and dynamics of functions of various complex variables in his studies. He developed a Fatou-Julia theory in two complex variables with Nessim Sibony. Additionally, he is recognized for creating a counterexample in several complex variables in 1976.

Fornæss is a fellow of the Norwegian Academy of Science and Letters. In 2015, he was elected a Fellow of the American Mathematical Society. Fornæss has an Erdős number of 2.

== Selected publications ==
=== Articles ===
- with Klas Diederich: Diederich K, Fornaess JE (1975). "Exhaustion functions and Stein neighborhoods for smooth pseudoconvex domains". Proc Natl Acad Sci U S A. 72 (9): 3279–3280. doi:10.1073/pnas.72.9.3279. PMC 432973. PMID 16592273.
- with Klas Diederich: Diederich K, Fornaess JE (1977). "Complex submanifolds in real-analytic pseudoconvex domains". Proc Natl Acad Sci U S A. 74 (8): 3126–3127. doi:10.1073/pnas.74.8.3126. PMC 431463. PMID 16592428.

=== Books ===
- with Berit Stensønes: Lectures on counterexamples in several complex variables, Mathematical Notes 33, Princeton University Press, 1987; 2nd edition 2007
- as editor: Dynamics of several complex variables, American Mathematical Society 1996
- as editor: Recent developments in several complex variables, Princeton University Press 1981
- as editor: Several complex variables (Proceedings Mittag-Leffler Institute 1987/88), Princeton University Press 1993
