= T. O. Engset =

Norwegian mathematician and engineer (1865–1943)

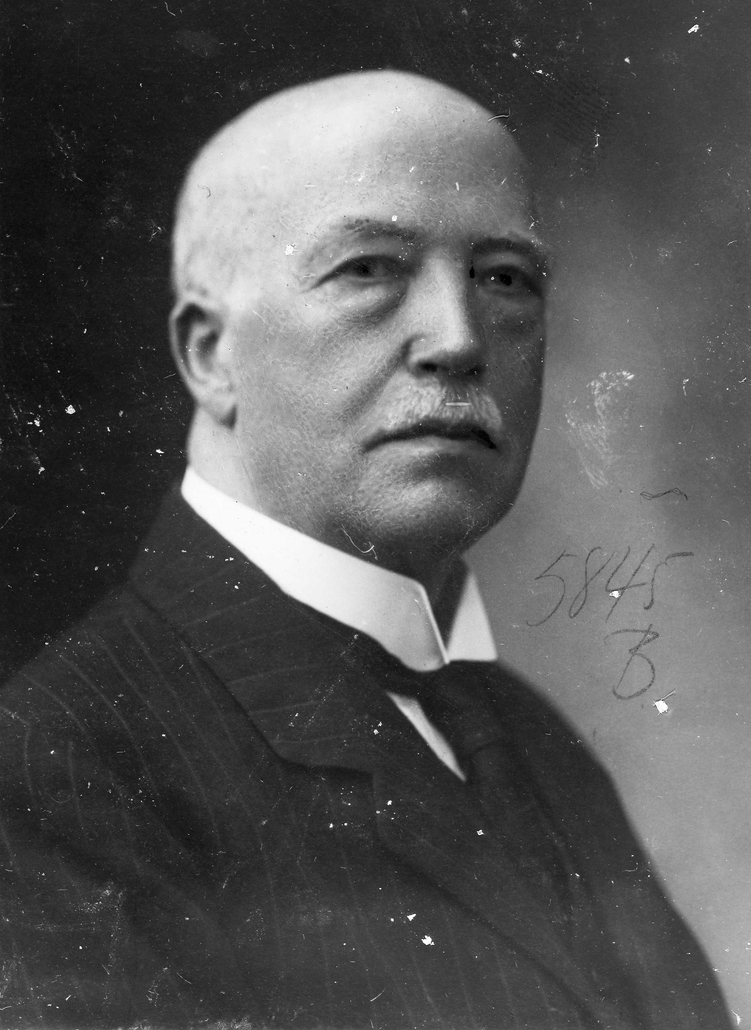
Engset in 1935.

Tore Olaus Engset (May 8, 1865 – October, 1943 in Oslo) was a Norwegian mathematician and engineer who did pioneering work in the field of telephone traffic queuing theory.

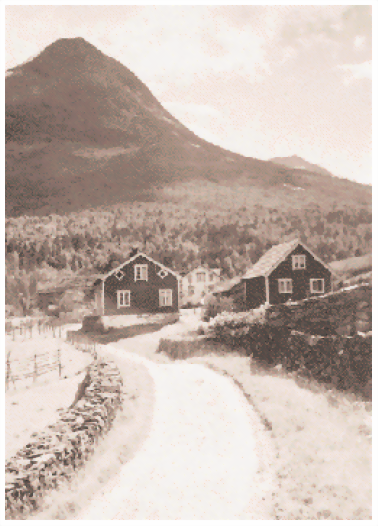
The farm at Engset in Stranda Municipality, where T. O. Engset grew up

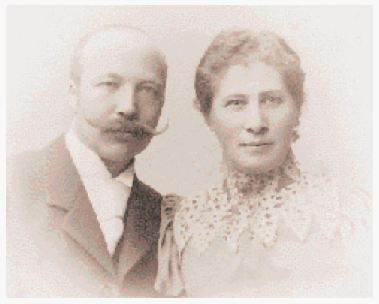
T. O. Engset and his wife Marie Amalie (1856–1927).

Tore Olaus Engset was born in Stranda Municipality in Møre og Romsdal, Norway. After he graduated school at the age of 18, Engset was admitted to the telegraph school in Stavanger in 1883. He received his certificate in a year and took employment. In his spare time he continued his studies, graduating in 1892 but continuing his university studies. Engset received an M.Sc. in physics and mathematics in 1894 at University of Oslo, after which he worked at Televerket as office worker, traffic analyst and from 1921 to 1922 and 1930–35 director general.

He developed the Engset formula in 1915, before the breakthroughs of A. K. Erlang from 1917. His 1915 manuscript "Om beregningen av vælgere i et automatisk telefonsystem" (1915) was not, however, published until 1918. That work was translated to German as "Die Wahrscheinlichkeitsrechnung zur Bestimmung der Wählerzahl in automatischen Fernsprechämtern", in Elektrotechnische Zeitschrift, Heft 31, 1918. An English translation appeared in Arne Myskja, "On the Calculation of Switches in an Automatic Telephone System" in Telektronikk, 94(2):99-142, 1998.

He also published a work on nuclear physics (1927): "Die Bahnen und die Lichtstrahlung der Wasserstoffelektronen. Ergänzende Betrachtungen über Bahnformen und Strahlungsfrequenzen" (3 parts) in Annalen der Physik, 82 (1927) 1017; 83 (1927) 903; 84 (1927) 880.

== Bibliography ==
- Arne Myskja: T. Engset in New Light. The 14th Nordic Teletraffic Seminar (NTS-14), Lyngby, Denmark, August 18–20, 1998.
- Arne Myskja: The Engset Report of 1915. Summary and Comments. Telektronikk, vol. 94, no. 2, pp. 143–153, 1998.
- Arne Myskja, Ola Espvik: Tore Olaus Engset - The man behind the formula. Tapir Academic Press, Trondheim, Norway, 2002. ISBN 82-519-1828-6.
