= Richard Birkeland =

Norwegian mathematician, author and professor

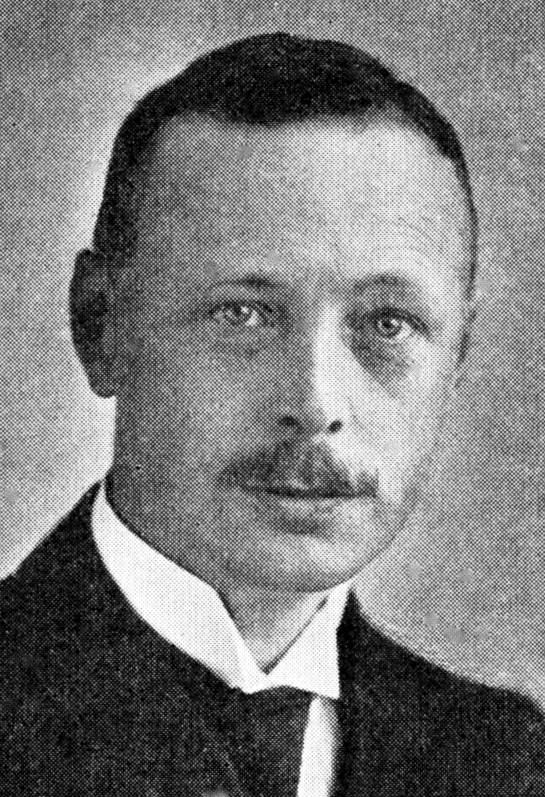
Richard Birkeland (1879 – 1928)

Richard Birkeland (6 June 1879 – 10 April 1928) was a Norwegian mathematician, author and professor. He is known for his contributions to the theory of algebraic equations.

== Biography ==
He was born at Farsund in Lister og Mandal county, Norway. He was the son of Theodor Birkeland (1834–1913) and Therese Karoline Overwien (1846–1883). He graduated from the Christiania Technical School in 1899. In 1906, he received a scholarship to study mathematics in Paris and Göttingen. He became a professor at the Norwegian Institute of Technology from 1910. He was rector of the Norwegian Institute of Technology and from 1923 professor at the University of Oslo.

He was a co-founder of the Norwegian Mathematical Society in 1918 and he was its vice chairman in the early years. He was for a time chairman of Trondheim Polytechnic Association. He was decorated Knight of the Order of St. Olav.

== Selected works ==
- Sur certaines singularités des équations différentielles (1909)
- Lærebok i matematisk analyse : differential- og integralregning, differentialligninger tillæg (1917)

== Personal life ==
He was a cousin of physics professor Kristian Birkeland (1867–1917). In 1909, he married Agnes Hoff (1883–1980). Their son Øivind (1910–2004) was a civil engineer.
