= John Rognes (army officer) =

Norwegian military officer (1902–1949)

John Ingebrigt Rognes
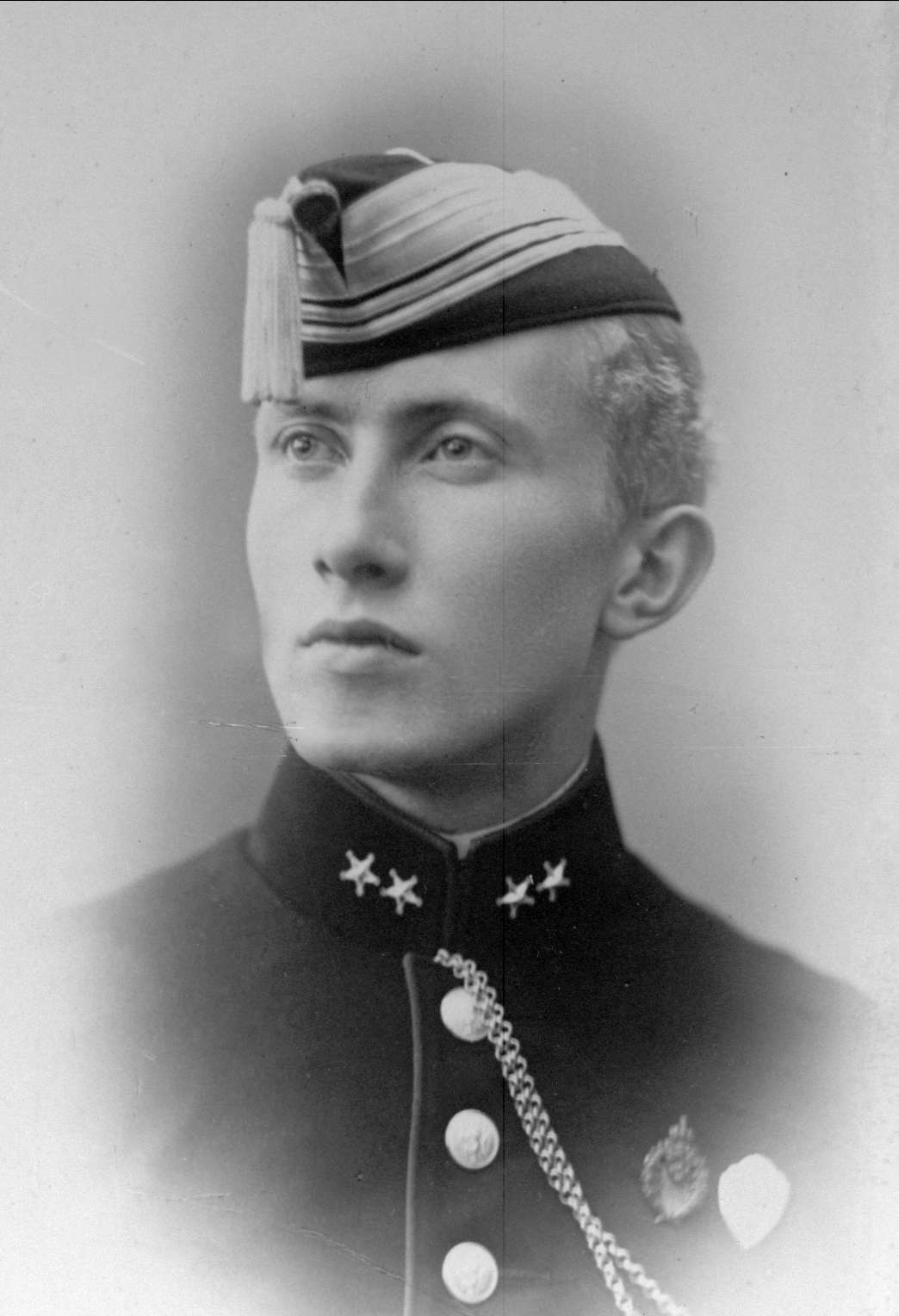
- Rognes, ca. 1924
- Born: 18 June 1902; Trondheim, Norway
- Died: 30 July 1949 (aged 47)
- Education: Norwegian Military Academy

John Ingebrigt Rognes (18 June 1902 – 30 July 1949) was a Norwegian military officer and Milorg pioneer.

== Career ==
Rognes was born in Trondheim to police officer I. Rognes and Marie Johanne Iversen, and was married to Ragna Brandt. He graduated from the Norwegian Military Academy in 1924. During the occupation of Norway by Nazi Germany he organized early military resistance, along with Olaf Helset and Paal Frisvold. In 1941 he fled to the United Kingdom, where he assumed a central position with the Norwegian Army in exile in Britain.
