= John Rognes (mathematician) =

Norwegian mathematician and professor

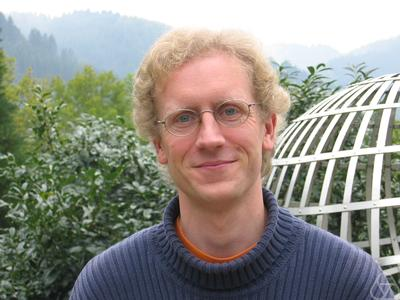
Rognes at the workshop Modern foundations for stable homotopy theory, Oberwolfach 2005

John Rognes (born 28 April 1966 in Oslo) is a Norwegian mathematician. He is a professor at the Department of Mathematics at the University of Oslo.

Rognes mathematical talent was visible from a young age; in 1984 he won a bronze medal at the International Mathematical Olympiad in Prague.

As a 19-year-old, he received his master's degree. He then went to Princeton University, where he received a PhD as a 24-year-old with the dissertation "The Rank Filtration in Algebraic K-theory".

In 1994, Rognes became an associate professor at Oslo, and in 1998 he was promoted to the rank of professor. He became Norway's youngest professor of mathematics. Rognes' research is about topological mathematics and algebraic K-theory. In 2004, he became one of the 26 who received a five-year scholarship as a Young Outstanding Researcher from the Research Council of Norway. From 2010 to 2014 was the editor of Acta Mathematica. In 2014, he was invited to speak at the International Congress of Mathematicians (ICM) in Seoul. From 2014 to 2018, he was chair of the Abel Committee.

== Selected publications ==
- Ausoni, Christian; Rognes, John (2002). "Algebraic K-theory of topological K-theory". Acta Mathematica. 188 (1): 1–39. doi:10.1007/bf02392794. ISSN 0001-5962. S2CID 9987011.
- Rognes, J.; Weibel, C. (23 August 1999). "Two-primary algebraic 𝐾-theory of rings of integers in number fields". Journal of the American Mathematical Society. 13 (1). appendix by M. Kolster: 1–54. doi:10.1090/s0894-0347-99-00317-3. hdl:10852/39337. ISSN 0894-0347.
- Waldhausen, Friedhelm; Jahren, Bjørn; Rognes, John (2013). Spaces of PL manifolds and categories of simple maps. Princeton: Princeton University Press. ISBN 978-1-4008-4652-8. OCLC 828077867.
