= Alf Victor Guldberg =

Norwegian mathematician (1866–1936)

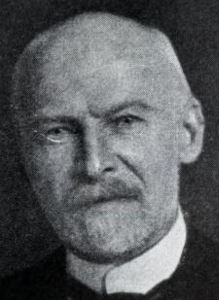
Alf Victor Emanuel Guldberg

Alf Victor Emanuel Guldberg (17 March 1866 in Oslo – 15 February 1936 in Vestre Aker) was a Norwegian mathematician.

His father was Axel Sophus Guldberg and his aunt was Cathinka Guldberg. Alf Guldberg received in 1892 his Ph.D. (Promotierung) and became in that year a privatdocent at (what is now called) the University of Oslo. In 1913 he became a professor there. He also taught at the Norwegian Military Academy and the Norwegian Military College.

Guldberg was made in 1897 a member of the Norwegian Academy of Science and Letters. He was also a member of the board of the life insurance company Norske Liv from 1902. He was the board chair of the Norwegian Actuarial Association from 1913 to 1919 and the Norwegian Mathematical Association from 1925 to 1929.

He was an Invited Speaker at the ICM in 1904 in Heidelberg, in 1920 in Strasbourg, in 1928 in Bologna, and in 1932 in Zürich. He was the author of about 80 mathematical papers in refereed journals and also the co-author, with George Wallenberg, of the 1911 textbook Theorie der linearen Differenzengleichungen.
