= Abel Prize =

Norwegian international mathematics prize

- Abel Prize logo
- Awarded for: Outstanding scientific work in the field of mathematics
- Country: Norway
- Presented by: Government of Norway
- First award: 2003
- Currently held by: Gerd Faltings (2026)
- Website: www.abelprize.no

The Abel Prize (/ˈɑːbəl/ AH-bəl; Norwegian: Abelprisen [ˈɑ̀ːbl̩ˌpriːsn̩]) is awarded annually by the king of Norway to one or more outstanding mathematicians. It is named after the Norwegian mathematician Niels Henrik Abel (1802–1829) and directly modeled after the Nobel Prizes; as such, it is sometimes considered the Nobel Prize of mathematics. It comes with a commemorative trophy and a monetary award of 7.5 million Norwegian kroner (NOK, about US$873,000 in 2026; increased from 6 million NOK in 2019).

The Abel Prize's history dates back to 1899, when its establishment was proposed by the Norwegian mathematician Sophus Lie when he learned that Alfred Nobel's plans for annual prizes would not include a prize in mathematics. In 1902, King Oscar II of Sweden and Norway indicated his willingness to finance the creation of a mathematics prize to complement the Nobel Prizes, but the establishment of the prize was prevented by the dissolution of the union between Norway and Sweden in 1905. It took almost a century before the prize was finally established by the Government of Norway in 2001, and it was specifically intended "to give the mathematicians their own equivalent of a Nobel Prize." The laureates are selected by the Abel Committee, the members of whom are appointed by the Norwegian Academy of Science and Letters.

The award ceremony takes place in the aula of the University of Oslo, where the Nobel Peace Prize was awarded between 1947 and 1989. The Abel Prize board has also established an Abel symposium, administered by the Norwegian Mathematical Society, which takes place twice a year.

== History ==
The prize was first proposed in 1899, to be part of the celebration of the 100th anniversary of Niels Henrik Abel's birth in 1802. The Norwegian mathematician Sophus Lie proposed establishing an Abel Prize when he learned that Alfred Nobel's plans for annual prizes would not include a prize in mathematics. King Oscar II was willing to finance a mathematics prize in 1902, and the mathematicians Ludwig Sylow and Carl Størmer drew up statutes and rules for the proposed prize. However, Lie's influence decreased after his death, and the dissolution of the union between Sweden and Norway in 1905 ended the first attempt to create an Abel Prize.

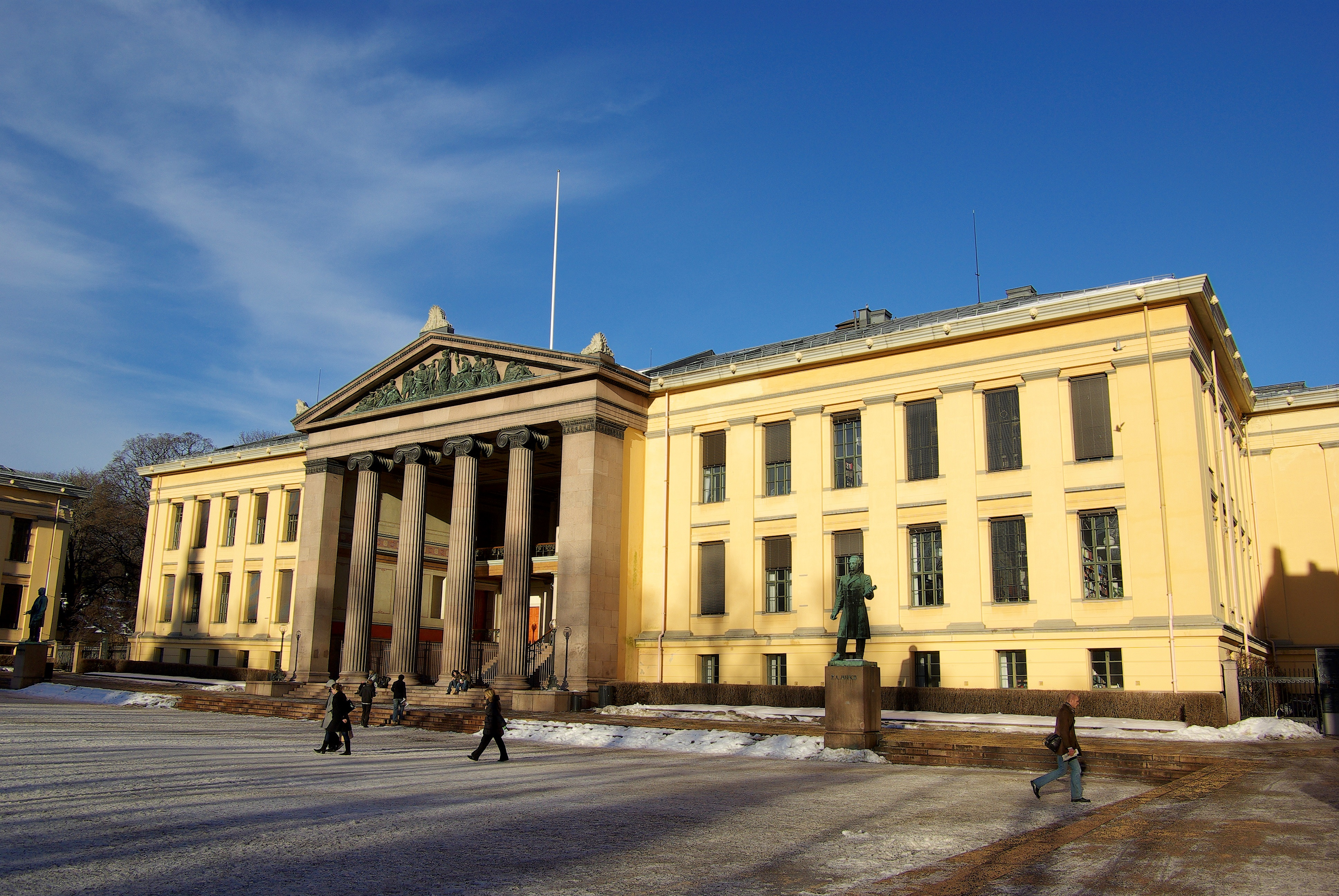
The prize is awarded in the aula of the Domus Media building of the University of Oslo Faculty of Law, where the Nobel Peace Prize was formerly awarded (it is now presented in Oslo City Hall)

After interest in the concept of the prize had risen in 2001, a working group was formed to develop a proposal, which was presented to the Prime Minister of Norway in May. In August 2001, the Norwegian government announced that the prize would be awarded beginning in 2002, the two-hundredth anniversary of Abel's birth. Atle Selberg received an honorary Abel Prize in 2002, but the first actual Abel Prize was awarded in 2003.

A book series presenting Abel Prize laureates and their research was commenced in 2010. The first three volumes cover the years 2003–2007, 2008–2012, and 2013–2017 respectively.

In 2019, Karen Uhlenbeck became the first woman to win the Abel Prize, with the award committee citing "the fundamental impact of her work on analysis, geometry and mathematical physics. The Bernt Michael Holmboe Memorial Prize was created in 2005. Named after Abel's teacher, it promotes excellence in teaching.

== Selection criteria and funding ==
Anyone may submit a nomination for the Abel Prize, although self-nominations are not permitted. The nominee must be alive. If the awardee dies after being declared the winner, the prize will be awarded posthumously.

The Norwegian Academy of Science and Letters declares the winner of the Abel Prize each March after recommendation by the Abel Committee, which consists of five leading mathematicians. Both Norwegians and non-Norwegians may serve on the Committee. They are elected by the Norwegian Academy of Science and Letters and nominated by the International Mathematical Union and the European Mathematical Society.

=== Funding ===
The Norwegian Government gave the prize an initial funding of NOK 200 million (about €21.7 million) in 2001. Previously, the funding came from the Abel foundation, but today the prize is financed directly through the national budget.

The funding is controlled by the Board, which consists of members elected by the Norwegian Academy of Science and Letters. The current board consists of Ingrid Kristine Glad (chair), Aslak Bakke Buan, Helge K. Dahle, Kristin Vinje, Cordian Riener and Gunn Elisabeth Birkelund.

== Laureates ==
Year	Recipient(s)	Institution(s)	Citation
2003	Jean-Pierre Serre	Collège de France	"For playing a key role in shaping the modern form of many parts of mathematics, including topology, algebraic geometry and number theory."
2004	Michael Atiyah	University of Edinburgh; University of Cambridge	"For their discovery and proof of the index theorem, bringing together topology, geometry and analysis, and their outstanding role in building new bridges between mathematics and theoretical physics."
2004	Isadore Singer	Massachusetts Institute of Technology; University of California, Berkeley	"For their discovery and proof of the index theorem, bringing together topology, geometry and analysis, and their outstanding role in building new bridges between mathematics and theoretical physics."
2005	Peter Lax	Courant Institute (NYU)	"For his groundbreaking contributions to the theory and application of partial differential equations and to the computation of their solutions."
2006	Lennart Carleson	Royal Institute of Technology	"For his profound and seminal contributions to harmonic analysis and the theory of smooth dynamical systems."
2007	S. R. Srinivasa Varadhan	Courant Institute (NYU)	"For his fundamental contributions to probability theory and in particular for creating a unified theory of large deviation."
2008	John G. Thompson	University of Florida	"For their profound achievements in algebra and in particular for shaping modern group theory."
2008	Jacques Tits	Collège de France	"For their profound achievements in algebra and in particular for shaping modern group theory."
2009	Mikhail Gromov	Institut des Hautes Études Scientifiques; Courant Institute (NYU)	"For his revolutionary contributions to geometry."
2010	John Tate	University of Texas at Austin	"For his vast and lasting impact on the theory of numbers."
2011	John Milnor	Stony Brook University	"For pioneering discoveries in topology, geometry, and algebra."
2012	Endre Szemerédi	Alfréd Rényi Institute; Rutgers University	"For his fundamental contributions to discrete mathematics and theoretical computer science, and in recognition of the profound and lasting impact of these contributions on additive number theory and ergodic theory."
2013	Pierre Deligne	Institute for Advanced Study	"For seminal contributions to algebraic geometry and for their transformative impact on number theory, representation theory, and related fields."
2014	Yakov Sinai	Princeton University; Landau Institute for Theoretical Physics	"For his fundamental contributions to dynamical systems, ergodic theory, and mathematical physics."
2015	John Nash	Princeton University	"For striking and seminal contributions to the theory of nonlinear partial differential equations and its applications to geometric analysis."
2015	Louis Nirenberg	Courant Institute (NYU)	"For striking and seminal contributions to the theory of nonlinear partial differential equations and its applications to geometric analysis."
2016	Andrew Wiles	University of Oxford	"For his stunning proof of Fermat's Last Theorem by way of the modularity conjecture for semistable elliptic curves, opening a new era in number theory."
2017	Yves Meyer	École normale supérieure Paris-Saclay	"For his pivotal role in the development of the mathematical theory of wavelets."
2018	Robert Langlands	Institute for Advanced Study	"For his visionary program connecting representation theory to number theory."
2019	Karen Uhlenbeck	University of Texas at Austin	"For her pioneering achievements in geometric partial differential equations, gauge theory and integrable systems, and for the fundamental impact of her work on analysis, geometry and mathematical physics."
2020	Hillel Furstenberg	Hebrew University of Jerusalem	"For pioneering the use of methods from probability and dynamics in group theory, number theory and combinatorics."
2020	Grigory Margulis	Yale University	"For pioneering the use of methods from probability and dynamics in group theory, number theory and combinatorics."
2021	László Lovász	Eötvös Loránd University	"For their foundational contributions to theoretical computer science and discrete mathematics, and their leading role in shaping them into central fields of modern mathematics".
2021	Avi Wigderson	Institute for Advanced Study	"For their foundational contributions to theoretical computer science and discrete mathematics, and their leading role in shaping them into central fields of modern mathematics".
2022	Dennis Sullivan	Stony Brook University; CUNY Graduate Center	"For his groundbreaking contributions to topology in its broadest sense, and in particular its algebraic, geometric and dynamical aspects."
2023	Luis Caffarelli	University of Texas at Austin	"For his seminal contributions to regularity theory for nonlinear partial differential equations including free-boundary problems and the Monge–Ampère equation."
2024	Michel Talagrand	Centre national de la recherche scientifique	"For his groundbreaking contributions to probability theory and functional analysis, with outstanding applications in mathematical physics and statistics."
2025	Masaki Kashiwara	Research Institute for Mathematical Sciences	"For his fundamental contributions to algebraic analysis and representation theory, in particular the development of the theory of D-modules and the discovery of crystal graphs."
2026	Gerd Faltings	Max Planck Institute for Mathematics	"For introducing powerful tools in arithmetic geometry and resolving long-standing diophantine conjectures of Mordell and Lang."

== Distribution by country and proportion of dual nationals ==
As for 2025, 11 out of 26 recipients were dual nationals.

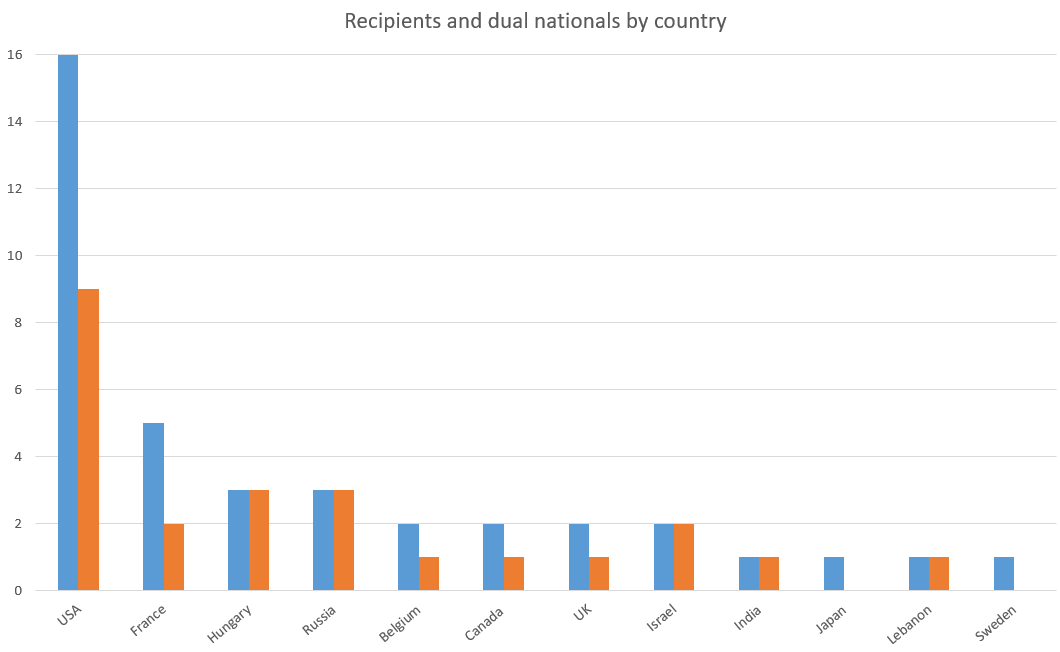
Number of recipients and dual nationals by country (2003–2025).

== See also ==
- Fields Medal
- List of prizes known as the Nobel or the highest honors of a field
- List of mathematics awards
