= List of things named after Sophus Lie =

This is a list of things named after Sophus Lie. Sophus Lie (1842 – 1899), a mathematician, is the eponym of all of the things (and topics) listed below.

- Carathéodory–Jacobi–Lie theorem
- Lie algebra
  - Lie-* algebra
  - Lie algebra bundle
  - Lie algebra cohomology
  - Lie algebra representation
  - Lie algebroid
  - Lie bialgebra
  - Lie coalgebra
  - Lie conformal algebra
  - Lie superalgebra
  - Abelian Lie algebra
  - Affine Lie algebra
  - Anyonic Lie algebra
  - Compact Lie algebra
  - Complex Lie algebra
  - Exceptional Lie algebra
  - Finite-dimensional and infinite-dimensional Lie algebras
  - Free Lie algebra
  - Graded Lie algebra
    - Differential graded Lie algebra
  - Homotopy Lie algebra
  - Malcev Lie algebra
  - Modular Lie algebra
  - Monster Lie algebra
  - Nilpotent Lie algebra
  - Nilradical of a Lie algebra
  - Orthogonal symmetric Lie algebra
  - Parabolic Lie algebra
  - Pre-Lie algebra
  - Quadratic Lie algebra
  - Quasi-Frobenius Lie algebra
  - Quasi-Lie algebra
  - Real Lie algebras
  - Reductive Lie algebra
  - Restricted Lie algebra
  - Semisimple Lie algebra
  - Split Lie algebra
  - Symplectic Lie algebra
  - Tangent Lie group
  - Tate Lie algebra
  - Toral Lie algebra
- Lie bracket of vector fields
- Lie derivative
- Lie group
  - Lie group decomposition
  - Lie groupoid
  - Lie subgroup
  - Complex Lie group
  - Local Lie group
  - Poisson–Lie group
  - Real Lie groups
  - Simple Lie group
  - Solvable Lie algebra
  - Special linear Lie algebra
  - Special orthogonal Lie algebra
  - Symmetric Lie group
  - Tangent Lie group
- Lie point symmetry
- Lie product formula
- Lie ring
- Lie sphere geometry
- Lie theory
- Lie–Kolchin theorem
- Lie–Palais theorem
- Lie's theorem
- Lie's third theorem
- Lie transform

== Other ==
- 26955 Lie

== See also ==
- Glossary of Lie algebras
- List of Lie groups topics
- List of simple Lie groups
- Table of Lie groups
