= Selberg =

Selberg may refer to:

== People ==
- Arne Selberg (1910–1989), Norwegian engineer
- Atle Selberg (1917–2007), Norwegian mathematician, after whom several mathematical entities are named
- David Selberg (1995–2018), Swedish ice hockey player
- Henrik Selberg (1906–1993), Norwegian mathematician
- Knut Selberg (born 1949), Norwegian architect, and urban designer
- Ole Michael Ludvigsen Selberg (1877–1950), Norwegian mathematician
- Shannon Selberg (born 1960), American rock musician
- Sigmund Selberg (1910–1994), Norwegian mathematician
- Tim Selberg (born 1959), maker of mechanized figures for ventriloquism

== Other uses ==
- Selberg (Kusel), a hill in the Rhineland-Palatinate, Germany

== See also ==
- Stary Żelibórz (formerly German: Sellberg), a village in West Pomeranian Voivodeship, Poland
- Sellenberg (disambiguation)
