= Quasi-Frobenius Lie algebra =

In mathematics, a quasi-Frobenius Lie algebra

$$(\mathfrak{g},[\,\,\,,\,\,\,],\beta )$$

over a field $k$ is a Lie algebra

$$(\mathfrak{g},[\,\,\,,\,\,\,] )$$

equipped with a nondegenerate skew-symmetric bilinear form

$\beta : \mathfrak{g}\times\mathfrak{g}\to k$, which is a Lie algebra 2-cocycle of $\mathfrak{g}$ with values in $k$. In other words,

$$\beta \left(\left[X,Y\right],Z\right)+\beta \left(\left[Z,X\right],Y\right)+\beta \left(\left[Y,Z\right],X\right)=0$$

for all $X$, $Y$, $Z$ in $\mathfrak{g}$.

If $\beta$ is a coboundary, which means that there exists a linear form $f : \mathfrak{g}\to k$ such that

$$\beta(X,Y)=f(\left[X,Y\right]),$$

then

$$(\mathfrak{g},[\,\,\,,\,\,\,],\beta )$$

is called a Frobenius Lie algebra.

== Equivalence with pre-Lie algebras with nondegenerate invariant skew-symmetric bilinear form ==
If $(\mathfrak{g},[\,\,\,,\,\,\,],\beta )$ is a quasi-Frobenius Lie algebra, one can define on $\mathfrak{g}$ another bilinear product $\triangleleft$ by the formula

$$\beta \left(\left[X,Y\right],Z\right)=\beta \left(Z \triangleleft Y,X \right)$$.

Then one has $\left[X,Y\right]=X \triangleleft Y-Y \triangleleft X$ and

$$(\mathfrak{g}, \triangleleft)$$

is a pre-Lie algebra.

== See also ==
- Lie coalgebra
- Lie bialgebra
- Lie algebra cohomology
- Frobenius algebra
- Quasi-Frobenius ring
