= Symmetric space (disambiguation) =

A symmetric space is, in differential geometry and representation theory, a smooth manifold whose group of symmetries contains an "inversion symmetry" about every point. Examples include:

- Riemannian symmetric space
- Hermitian symmetric space
- Quaternion-Kähler symmetric space
- Weakly symmetric space

In topology, symmetric space may also refer to:

- R_{0} space, a topological space in which two topologically distinguishable points can be separated

In computational complexity theory, symmetric space may refer to undirected or reversible analogues of nondeterministic space complexity, for instance:

- SL (complexity), the class of problems solvable in logarithmic symmetric space
