= Manin triple =

Mathematics concept

In mathematics, a Manin triple $(\mathfrak{g}, \mathfrak{p}, \mathfrak{q})$ consists of a Lie algebra $\mathfrak{g}$ with a non-degenerate invariant symmetric bilinear form, together with two isotropic subalgebras $\mathfrak{p}$ and $\mathfrak{q}$ such that $\mathfrak{g}$ is the direct sum of $\mathfrak{p}$ and $\mathfrak{q}$ as a vector space. A closely related concept is the (classical) Drinfeld double, which is an even dimensional Lie algebra which admits a Manin decomposition.

Manin triples were introduced by Vladimir Drinfeld in 1987, who named them after Yuri Manin.

In 2001 Delorme classified Manin triples where $\mathfrak{g}$ is a complex reductive Lie algebra.

== Manin triples and Lie bialgebras ==
There is an equivalence of categories between finite-dimensional Manin triples and finite-dimensional Lie bialgebras.

More precisely, if $(\mathfrak{g}, \mathfrak{p}, \mathfrak{q})$ is a finite-dimensional Manin triple, then $\mathfrak{p}$ can be made into a Lie bialgebra by letting the cocommutator map $\mathfrak{p} \to \mathfrak{p} \otimes \mathfrak{p}$ be the dual of the Lie bracket $\mathfrak{q} \otimes \mathfrak{q} \to \mathfrak{q}$ (using the fact that the symmetric bilinear form on $\mathfrak{g}$ identifies $\mathfrak{q}$ with the dual of $\mathfrak{p}$).

Conversely if $\mathfrak{p}$ is a Lie bialgebra then one can construct a Manin triple $(\mathfrak{p} \oplus \mathfrak{p}^*, \mathfrak{p}, \mathfrak{p}^*)$ by letting $\mathfrak{q}$ be the dual of $\mathfrak{p}$ and defining the commutator of $\mathfrak{p}$ and $\mathfrak{q}$ to make the bilinear form on $\mathfrak{g} = \mathfrak{p} \oplus \mathfrak{q}$ invariant.

== Examples ==
- Suppose that $\mathfrak{a}$ is a complex semisimple Lie algebra with invariant symmetric bilinear form $(\cdot,\cdot)$. Then there is a Manin triple $(\mathfrak{g}, \mathfrak{p}, \mathfrak{q})$ with $\mathfrak{g} = \mathfrak{a} \oplus \mathfrak{a}$, with the scalar product on $\mathfrak{g}$ given by $( (w,x),(y,z) ) = (w,y) - (x,z)$. The subalgebra $\mathfrak{p}$ is the space of diagonal elements $(x,x)$, and the subalgebra $\mathfrak{q}$ is the space of elements $(x,y)$ with $x$ in a fixed Borel subalgebra containing a Cartan subalgebra $\mathfrak{h}$, $y$ in the opposite Borel subalgebra, and where $x$ and $y$ have the same component in $\mathfrak{h}$.
