= Cammermeyer =

Cammermeyer is a surname. Notable people with the surname include:

- Albert Cammermeyer (1838–1893), Norwegian bookseller and publisher
- Johan Sebastian Cammermeyer (1730–1819), Norwegian Lutheran priest
- Margarethe Cammermeyer (born 1942), American National Guard colonel and gay rights activist
