= Schellenberg (surname) =

Schellenberg is a toponymic surname derived from any of various places in Germany and Switzerland. Notable people with the surname include:

- Aldo C. Schellenberg (born 1958), Swiss military officer
- August Schellenberg (1936–2013), Canadian actor
- Ernst Schellenberg (1907–1984), German politician
- Glenn Schellenberg, Canadian composer and professor
- Harry Schellenberg, Canadian politician
- Hans Conrad Schellenberg (1872–1923), Swiss botanist and agronomist
- J. L. Schellenberg (born 1959), Canadian philosopher and professor
- Johann Rudolph Schellenberg (1740–1806), Swiss artist, writer and entomologist
- Joseph von Schellenberg (1735–1801), Austrian infantry commander
- Katharina Schellenberg (1870–1945), American medical missionary
- Keith Schellenberg (1929–2019), English businessman and bobsledder
- Max Schellenberg (1927–2000), Swiss racing cyclist
- Robert Lloyd Schellenberg (born 1982), Canadian criminal
- Susanna Schellenberg (born 1979), Lebanese professor and author
- T. R. Schellenberg (1903–1970), American archivist and archival theorist
- Ted Schellenberg (born 1952), Canadian broadcaster and politician
- Tobias Schellenberg (born 1978), German diver
- Walter Schellenberg (1910–1952), German SS functionary

== See also ==
- Schellenberg
- Schellenberger
- Shellenberger

Media related to Schellenberg (surname) at Wikimedia Commons
