= Nonlocal symmetry =

Mathematical physics

In mathematical physics and the theory of differential equations, a nonlocal symmetry is a symmetry of a differential equation whose infinitesimal generator depends on integral or potential variables, rather than solely on the independent variables, the dependent variables, and a finite number of their derivatives. Unlike local symmetries (e.g., Lie point symmetries or contact symmetries), nonlocal symmetries cannot be detected within the standard finite-dimensional jet bundle formalism. They often arise from Bäcklund transformations, reciprocal transformations, Lax pairs, or from systematic constructions like conservation-law (CL) coverings and inverse potential systems (IPSs).

== Historical background ==
During the twentieth century, researchers discovered that many important nonlinear equations possess hidden symmetries that cannot be represented solely in terms of local variables and their derivatives. Studies of integrable systems such as the Korteweg–de Vries (KdV) equation, nonlinear Schrödinger equation, and sine-Gordon equation revealed the existence of infinite-dimensional symmetry structures generated by nonlocal operators.

The modern geometric formulation of nonlocal symmetries emerged through the work of Vinogradov, Krasil'shchik, Bluman, Anco, Olver, and many others, who developed the theory of coverings, potential symmetries, and conservation-law-based symmetry methods .

== Formal definition ==
Consider a differential equation

$\Delta(x,u^{(n)})=0,$

where $x$ denotes the independent variables, $u$ the dependent variables, and $u^{(n)}$ represents the collection of derivatives up to order $n$.

A classical Lie symmetry is generated by a vector field

$X=\xi^i(x,u)\frac{\partial}{\partial x^i} +\phi^\alpha(x,u)\frac{\partial}{\partial u^\alpha}.$

A nonlocal symmetry extends this framework by allowing the coefficients $\xi^i$ and $\phi^\alpha$ to depend on additional variables:

$w=(w^1,\ldots,w^m),$

which satisfy auxiliary differential relations such as

$w_x = F(x,u,u_x,\ldots).$

The resulting symmetry generator has the form

$X=\xi^i(x,u,w)\frac{\partial}{\partial x^i} +\phi^\alpha(x,u,w)\frac{\partial}{\partial u^\alpha}.$

Because the variables (w) are defined through integration or other nonlocal constructions, the corresponding symmetry is called nonlocal.

== Applications ==
Nonlocal symmetries have numerous applications in mathematics and mathematical physics, including:

- construction of exact solutions;
- similarity reductions;
- classification of integrable equations;
- generation of soliton solutions.

In recent years, nonlocal symmetry methods have also been applied to fractional differential equations, nonlocal diffusion models, and reaction–diffusion systems (e.g.)
