= Sellenberg =

Sellenberg is the name of hills in Germany:

- Žale, Kamnik, Slovenia, known as Sellenberg in the 15th century

== See also ==
- Šelenberg, a local name for Zelen Breg, Slovenia
- Selberg (disambiguation)
- Sellenberk, Romania
- Schellenberg (disambiguation)
- Stellenberg, Bellville, South Africa
