= Arøya =

Island in Vestfold, Norway

- Interactive map of the island

Geography
- Location: Vestfold, Norway
- Coordinates: 59.00245°N 9.79811°E

Administration
- Norway
- County: Vestfold
- Municipality: Larvik Municipality

Arøya is a group of three small islands in Larvik Municipality in Vestfold county, Norway. They are located in the outer part of the Langesundsfjorden approximately midway between the town of Langesund (in Bamble Municipality in Telemark) and the village of Helgeroa in Larvik Municipality. The three islands are named Store Arøya, Lille Arøya, and Vesle Arøya ('Big', 'Small' and 'Tiny' Arøya).

The islands of Arøya are a recreational cottage area for the population in the Grenland, Vestfold, and even as far away as Oslo, about a 90-minute drive away. There are still a few families residing on the islands, where fishing is the prime source of income. In the summer season, a local ferry (Skjæløy) connects Helgeroa with Langesund. The ferry makes several stops on the islands. The trip is frequently used by tourists going roundtrip for a great view of the area. Bikers also use the ferry as a shortcut connection to the southern shores of Norway.

== See also ==
- List of islands of Norway
