= Arne Selberg =

Norwegian civil engineer (1910–1989)

- Born: 11 August 1910; Langesund, Norway
- Died: 25 May 1989 (aged 78)
- Occupation: civil engineer

Arne Selberg (11 August 1910 – 25 May 1989) was a Norwegian civil engineer. He was born in Langesund as the son of Ole Michael Ludvigsen Selberg and Anna Kristina Brigtsdatter Skeie. He was twin brother of Sigmund Selberg and brother of Henrik Selberg and Atle Selberg. He was appointed professor at the Norwegian Institute of Technology from 1949 to 1979, and served as rector from 1963 to 1969. His speciality was design of suspension bridges. During the occupation of Norway by Nazi Germany Selberg cooperated with the XU intelligence network. He was a member of various commissions and board member of several institutions and companies. He was decorated Commander of the Order of St. Olav in 1966.
