= Lie bialgebra =

In mathematics, a Lie bialgebra is the Lie-theoretic case of a bialgebra: it is a set with a Lie algebra and a Lie coalgebra structure which are compatible.

It is a bialgebra where the multiplication is skew-symmetric and satisfies a dual Jacobi identity, so that the dual vector space is a Lie algebra, whereas the comultiplication is a 1-cocycle, so that the multiplication and comultiplication are compatible. The cocycle condition implies that, in practice, one studies only classes of bialgebras that are cohomologous to a Lie bialgebra on a coboundary.

They are also called Poisson-Hopf algebras, and are the Lie algebra of a Poisson–Lie group.

Lie bialgebras occur naturally in the study of the Yang–Baxter equations.

== Definition ==
A vector space $\mathfrak{g}$ is a Lie bialgebra if it is a Lie algebra, and there is the structure of Lie algebra also on the dual vector space $\mathfrak{g}^*$ which is compatible. More precisely the Lie algebra structure on $\mathfrak{g}$ is given by a Lie bracket $[\ ,\ ]:\mathfrak{g} \otimes \mathfrak{g} \to \mathfrak{g}$ and the Lie algebra structure on $\mathfrak{g}^*$ is given by a Lie bracket $\delta^*:\mathfrak{g}^* \otimes \mathfrak{g}^* \to \mathfrak{g}^*$. Then the map dual to $\delta^*$ is called the cocommutator, $\delta:\mathfrak{g} \to \mathfrak{g} \otimes \mathfrak{g}$ and the compatibility condition is the following cocycle relation:

$$\delta([X,Y]) = \left(\operatorname{ad}_X \otimes 1 + 1 \otimes \operatorname{ad}_X\right) \delta(Y) - \left(\operatorname{ad}_Y \otimes 1 + 1 \otimes \operatorname{ad}_Y\right) \delta(X)$$

where $\operatorname{ad}_XY=[X,Y]$ is the adjoint. Note that this definition is symmetric and $\mathfrak{g}^*$ is also a Lie bialgebra, the dual Lie bialgebra.

== Example ==
Let $\mathfrak{g}$ be any semisimple Lie algebra. To specify a Lie bialgebra structure we thus need to specify a compatible Lie algebra structure on the dual vector space. Choose a Cartan subalgebra $\mathfrak{t}\subset \mathfrak{g}$ and a choice of positive roots. Let $\mathfrak{b}_\pm\subset \mathfrak{g}$ be the corresponding opposite Borel subalgebras, so that $\mathfrak{t} = \mathfrak{b}_-\cap\mathfrak{b}_+$ and there is a natural projection $\pi:\mathfrak{b}_\pm \to \mathfrak{t}$. Then define a Lie algebra

$$\mathfrak{g'} := \{ (X_-,X_+)\in \mathfrak{b}_- \times \mathfrak{b}_+\ \bigl\vert\ \pi(X_-) + \pi(X_+) = 0\}$$

which is a subalgebra of the product $\mathfrak{b}_- \times \mathfrak{b}_+$, and has the same dimension as $\mathfrak{g}$. Now identify $\mathfrak{g'}$ with dual of $\mathfrak{g}$ via the pairing

$$\langle (X_-,X_+), Y \rangle := K(X_+ - X_-, Y)$$

where $Y\in \mathfrak{g}$ and $K$ is the Killing form. This defines a Lie bialgebra structure on $\mathfrak{g}$, and is the "standard" example: it underlies the Drinfeld-Jimbo quantum group. Note that $\mathfrak{g'}$ is solvable, whereas $\mathfrak{g}$ is semisimple.

== Relation to Poisson–Lie groups ==
The Lie algebra $\mathfrak{g}$ of a Poisson–Lie group G has a natural structure of Lie bialgebra. In brief the Lie group structure gives the Lie bracket on $\mathfrak{g}$ as usual, and the linearisation of the Poisson structure on G gives the Lie bracket on $\mathfrak{g^*}$ (recalling that a linear Poisson structure on a vector space is the same thing as a Lie bracket on the dual vector space). In more detail, let G be a Poisson–Lie group, with $f_1,f_2 \in C^\infty(G)$ being two smooth functions on the group manifold. Let $\xi= (df)_e$ be the differential at the identity element. Clearly, $\xi \in \mathfrak{g}^*$. The Poisson structure on the group then induces a bracket on $\mathfrak{g}^*$, as

$$[\xi_1,\xi_2] = (d\{f_1,f_2\})_e\,$$

where $\{,\}$ is the Poisson bracket. Given $\eta$ be the Poisson bivector on the manifold, define $\eta^R$ to be the right-translate of the bivector to the identity element in G. Then one has that

$$\eta^R:G\to \mathfrak{g} \otimes \mathfrak{g}$$

The cocommutator is then the tangent map:

$$\delta = T_e \eta^R\,$$

so that

$$[\xi_1,\xi_2]= \delta^*(\xi_1 \otimes \xi_2)$$

is the dual of the cocommutator.

== See also ==
- Lie coalgebra
- Manin triple
