= Sigmund Selberg =

Norwegian mathematician

- Born: 11 August 1910; Langesund, Norway
- Died: 20 April 1994 (aged 83)
- Occupation: Mathematician

Sigmund Selberg (11 August 1910 – 20 April 1994) was a Norwegian mathematician. He was born in Langesund as the son of Ole Michael Ludvigsen Selberg and Anna Kristina Brigtsdatter Skeie. He was twin brother of Arne Selberg and brother of Henrik Selberg and Atle Selberg. He was appointed professor of mathematics at the Norwegian Institute of Technology in Trondheim from 1947 to 1977. His works mainly focused on the distribution of prime numbers.
