= Schellenberg (disambiguation) =

Schellenberg is a municipality in the lowland area of Liechtenstein, on the banks of the Rhine.

Schellenberg may also refer to:

- Schellenberg (surname)
- Hellenhahn-Schellenberg, a municipality in Westerwaldkreis, Rhineland-Palatinate, Germany
- Lordship of Schellenberg, a historic state of the Holy Roman Empire, now in Liechtenstein

== See also ==
- Schellenberger, a surname
