= Shallenberger =

Shallenberger is a surname. Notable people with the surname include:

- Ashton C. Shallenberger (1862–1938), American politician from Nebraska
- David Shallenberger, American politician from Utah
- Oliver B. Shallenberger (1860–1898), American engineer and inventor
- William Shadrack Shallenberger (1839–1914), American politician from Pennsylvania

== See also ==
- Shellenberger
- Schellenberger
- Schellenberg
- Callenberg
