= Shellenberger =

Shellenberger is a surname of German origin. Its German spelling is Schellenberger. Notable people with the surname include:

- Allen Shellenberger (1969–2009), American rock drummer
- Betty Shellenberger (1921–2019), American field hockey player and coach
- John S. Shellenberger (1839–1911), American Civil War Medal of Honor recipient
- Michael Shellenberger (born 1971), American writer, advocate of nuclear power, and self-described ecomodernist
- Susie Shellenberger, American motivational speaker, writer, and magazine editor

== See also ==
- Schellenberger, a surname
- Schellenberg (disambiguation)
- Shallenberger, a surname
