= Langøytangen Lighthouse =

Lighthouse in Telemark, Norway

Langøytangen Lighthouse Langøytangen fyrstasjon
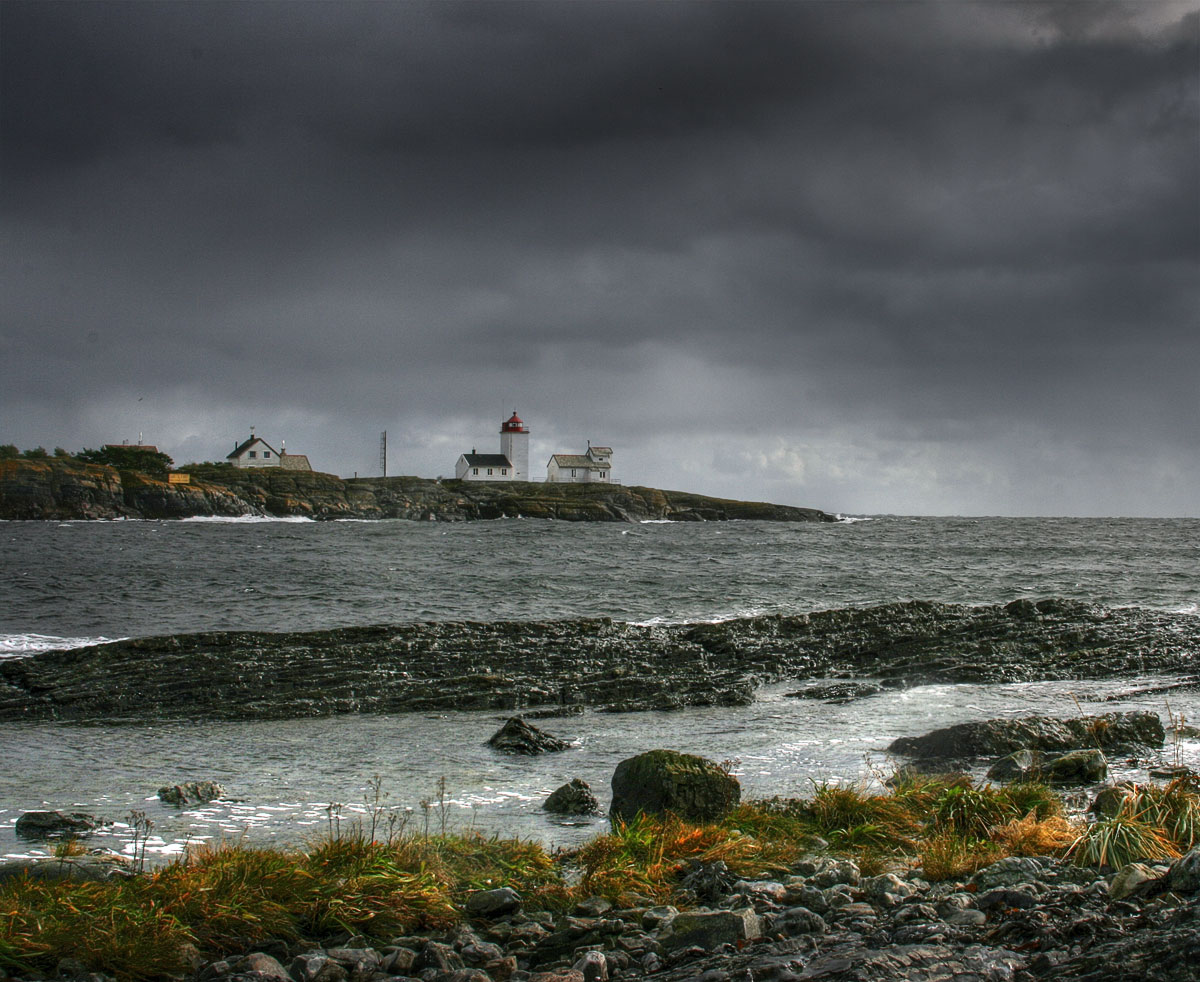
- View of the lighthouse
- Location of the lighthouse
- Location: Telemark, Norway
- Coordinates: 58°59′27″N 9°45′29″E

Tower
- Constructed: 1839 (first)
- Foundation: granite
- Construction: masonry
- Automated: 1990
- Height: 14.5 metres (48 ft)
- Shape: square tower
- Markings: white with red top
- Fog signal: yes

Light
- First lit: 1876 (current)
- Focal height: 18.5 metres (61 ft)
- Range: Red: 5.9 nmi (10.9 km; 6.8 mi) Green: 5.6 nmi (10.4 km; 6.4 mi) White: 8 nmi (15 km; 9.2 mi)
- Characteristic: Oc WRG 6s
- Norway no.: 044200

Langøytangen Lighthouse (Norwegian: Langøytangen fyr) is a fully automated coastal lighthouse situated on the island of Langøya just off shore of the town of Langesund in Bamble Municipality in Agder county, Norway. It marks the southern point of the Langesund Sound. It is available for rental for overnight guests.

The light sits at an elevation of 17 metres (56 ft), emitting a white, red, or green light depending on direction. The light is occulting once every 6 seconds. The 12 metres (39 ft) tall square stone tower is attached to one end of a one-story keeper's house. The lighthouse is painted white and the lantern and gallery on top are painted red. A foghorn emits two blasts every 60 seconds.

== See also ==
- List of lighthouses in Norway
- Lighthouses in Norway
