= Archiv for Mathematik og Naturvidenskab =

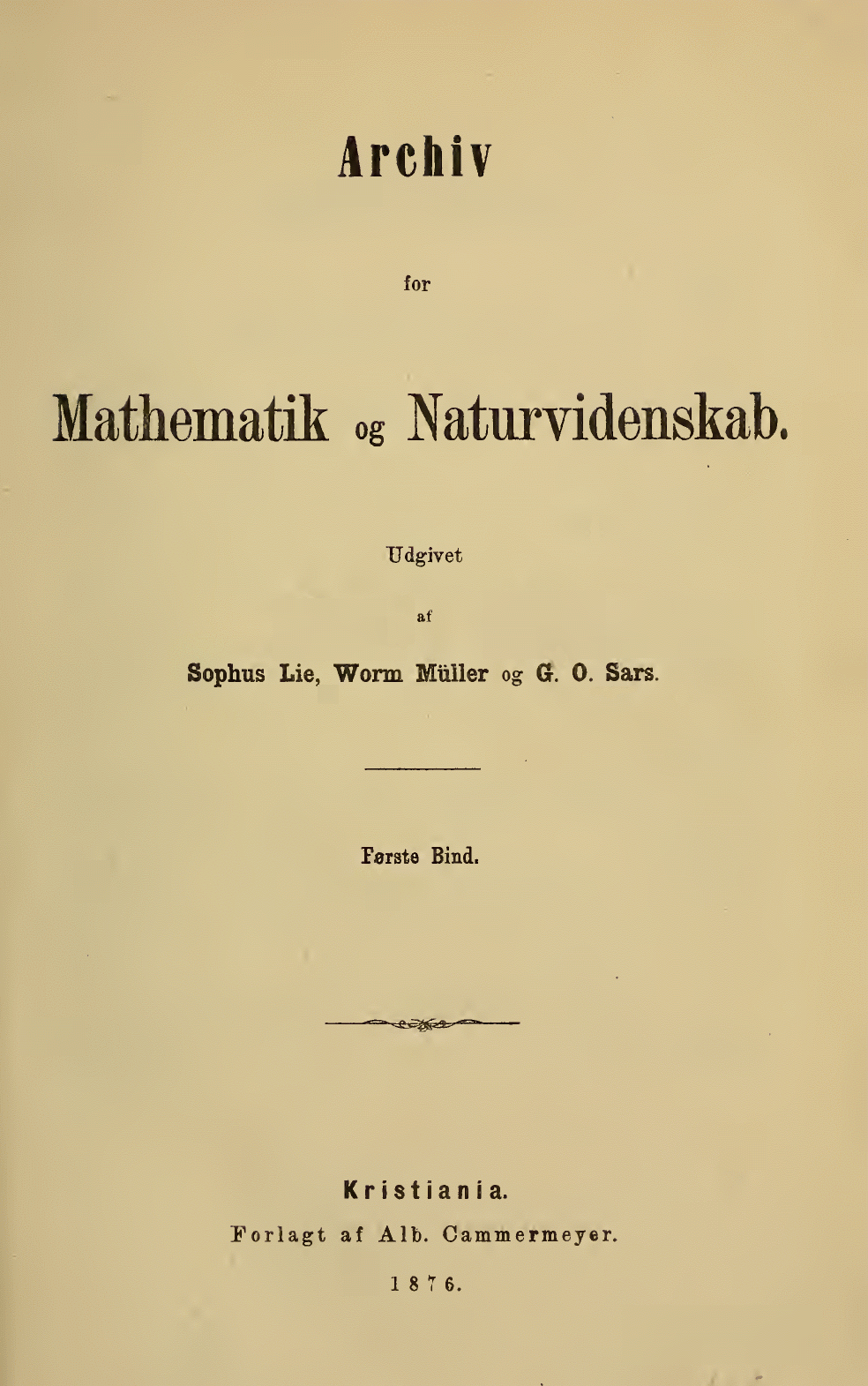
- Language: Norwegian, German
- Edited by: Sophus Lie, Jacob Worm-Müller), Georg Ossian Sars

Publication details
- History: 1876-1961
- Publisher: Albert Cammermeyer (Norway)

Standard abbreviations
- ISO 4: Arch. math. naturvidenskab

Indexing
- ISSN: 0365-4524
- LCCN: sv90020213
- OCLC no.: 1481911

The Archiv for Mathematik og Naturvidenskab (translated: Archive of mathematics and natural science) was a scientific journal published in Oslo. Its first issue appeared in 1876, and was edited by the mathematician Sophus Lie, the physician Jacob Worm-Müller, and the biologist Georg Ossian Sars, and published by Albert Cammermeyer. The last issue appeared in 1961.

Lie published his work on transformation groups (now called Lie groups) in the 1876 volume (p.19-57, 152-193).
