= Carathéodory–Jacobi–Lie theorem =

Theorem in symplectic geometry which generalizes Darboux's theorem

The Carathéodory–Jacobi–Lie theorem is a theorem in symplectic geometry which generalizes Darboux's theorem.

== Statement ==
Let M be a 2n-dimensional symplectic manifold with symplectic form ω. For p ∈ M and r ≤ n, let f_{1}, f_{2}, ..., f_{r} be smooth functions defined on an open neighborhood V of p whose differentials are linearly independent at each point, or equivalently

$$df_1(p) \wedge \ldots \wedge df_r(p) \neq 0,$$

where {f_{i}, f_{j}} = 0. (In other words, they are pairwise in involution.) Here {–,–} is the Poisson bracket. Then there are functions f_{r+1}, ..., f_{n}, g_{1}, g_{2}, ..., g_{n} defined on an open neighborhood U ⊂ V of p such that (f_{i}, g_{i}) is a symplectic chart of M, i.e., ω is expressed on U as

$$\omega = \sum_{i=1}^n df_i \wedge dg_i.$$

== Applications ==
As a direct application we have the following. Given a Hamiltonian system as $(M,\omega,H)$ where M is a symplectic manifold with symplectic form $\omega$ and H is the Hamiltonian function, around every point where $dH \neq 0$ there is a symplectic chart such that one of its coordinates is H.
