= Poisson–Lie group =

Poisson manifold that is also a Lie group

In mathematics, a Poisson–Lie group is a Poisson manifold that is also a Lie group, with the group multiplication being compatible with the Poisson algebra structure on the manifold.

The infinitesimal counterpart of a Poisson–Lie group is a Lie bialgebra, in analogy to Lie algebras as the infinitesimal counterparts of Lie groups.

Many quantum groups are quantizations of the Poisson algebra of functions on a Poisson–Lie group.

== Definition ==
A Poisson–Lie group is a Lie group $G$ equipped with a Poisson bracket for which the group multiplication $\mu:G\times G\to G$ with $\mu(g_1, g_2)=g_1g_2$ is a Poisson map, where the manifold $G\times G$ has been given the structure of a product Poisson manifold.

Explicitly, the following identity must hold for a Poisson–Lie group:

$$\{f_1,f_2\} (gg') =
\{f_1 \circ L_g, f_2 \circ L_g\} (g') +
\{f_1 \circ R_{g^\prime}, f_2 \circ R_{g'}\} (g)$$

where $f_1$ and $f_2$ are real-valued, smooth functions on the Lie group, while $g$ and $g'$ are elements of the Lie group. Here, $L_g$ denotes left-multiplication and $R_g$ denotes right-multiplication.

If $\mathcal{P}$ denotes the corresponding Poisson bivector on $G$, the condition above can be equivalently stated as

$$\mathcal{P}(gg') = L_{g \ast}(\mathcal{P}(g')) + R_{g' \ast}(\mathcal{P}(g))$$

In particular, taking $g = g' = e$ one obtains $\mathcal{P}(e) = 0$, or equivalently $\{f,g\}(e) = 0$. Applying Weinstein splitting theorem to $e$ one sees that non-trivial Poisson-Lie structure is never symplectic, not even of constant rank.

== Poisson-Lie groups - Lie bialgebra correspondence ==
The Lie algebra $\mathfrak{g}$ of a Poisson–Lie group has a natural structure of Lie coalgebra given by linearising the Poisson tensor $P: G \to TG \wedge TG$ at the identity, i.e. $\delta:= d_eP: \mathfrak{g} \to \mathfrak{g} \wedge \mathfrak{g}$ is a comultiplication. Moreover, the algebra and the coalgebra structure are compatible, i.e. $\mathfrak{g}$ is a Lie bialgebra,

The classical Lie group–Lie algebra correspondence, which gives an equivalence of categories between simply connected Lie groups and finite-dimensional Lie algebras, was extended by Drinfeld to an equivalence of categories between simply connected Poisson–Lie groups and finite-dimensional Lie bialgebras.

Thanks to Drinfeld theorem, any Poisson–Lie group $G$ has a dual Poisson–Lie group, defined as the Poisson–Lie group integrating the dual $\mathfrak{g}^*$ of its bialgebra.

== Homomorphisms ==
A Poisson–Lie group homomorphism $\phi:G\to H$ is defined to be both a Lie group homomorphism and a Poisson map. Although this is the "obvious" definition, neither left translations nor right translations are Poisson maps. Also, the inversion map $\iota:G\to G$ taking $\iota(g)=g^{-1}$ is not a Poisson map either, although it is an anti-Poisson map:

$$\{f_1 \circ \iota, f_2 \circ \iota \} =
-\{f_1, f_2\} \circ \iota$$

for any two smooth functions $f_1, f_2$ on $G$.

== Examples ==
=== Trivial examples ===
- Any trivial Poisson structure on a Lie group $G$ defines a Poisson–Lie group structure, whose bialgebra is simply $\mathfrak{g}$ with the trivial comultiplication.
- The dual $\mathfrak{g}^*$ of a Lie algebra, together with its linear Poisson structure, is an additive Poisson–Lie group.

These two example are dual of each other via Drinfeld theorem, in the sense explained above.

=== Other examples ===
Let $G$ be any semisimple Lie group. Choose a maximal torus $T\subset G$ and a choice of positive roots. Let $B_\pm\subset G$ be the corresponding opposite Borel subgroups, so that $T = B_-\cap B_+$ and there is a natural projection $\pi:B_\pm \to T$. Then define a Lie group

$$G^*:=\{ (g_-,g_+)\in B_-\times B_+\  \bigl\vert\  \pi(g_-)\pi(g_+)=1\}$$

which is a subgroup of the product $B_-\times B_+$, and has the same dimension as $G$.

The standard Poisson–Lie group structure on $G$ is determined by identifying the Lie algebra of $G^*$ with the dual of the Lie algebra of $G$, as in the standard Lie bialgebra example. This defines a Poisson–Lie group structure on both $G$ and on the dual Poisson Lie group $G^*$. This is the "standard" example: the Drinfeld-Jimbo quantum group $U_q\mathfrak{g}$ is a quantization of the Poisson algebra of functions on the group $G^*$. Note that $G^*$ is solvable, whereas $G$ is semisimple.

== See also ==
- Lie bialgebra
- Quantum group
- Affine quantum group
- Quantum affine algebras
