= Henrik Selberg =

Norwegian mathematician

- Born: 17 February 1906; Bergen, Norway
- Died: 3 September 1993 (aged 87)
- Occupation: Mathematician
- Employer: University of Oslo
- Known for: Works on complex functions and potential theory
- Parent: Ole Michael Ludvigsen Selberg
- Relatives: Sigmund Selberg (brother); Arne Selberg (brother); Atle Selberg (brother)

Henrik Ludvig Selberg (17 February 1906 – 3 September 1993) was a Norwegian mathematician. He was born in Bergen as the son of Ole Michael Ludvigsen Selberg and Anna Kristina Brigtsdatter Skeie. He was a brother of Sigmund, Arne and Atle Selberg. He was appointed professor at the University of Oslo from 1962 to 1973. He is best known for his works on complex functions and potential theory.
