= Tangent Lie group =

In mathematics, a tangent Lie group is a Lie group whose underlying space is the tangent bundle TG of a Lie group G. As a Lie group, the tangent bundle is a semidirect product of a normal abelian subgroup with underlying space the Lie algebra of G, and G itself.
