= Ole Michael Ludvigsen Selberg =

Norwegian mathematician (1877–1950)

Ole Selberg
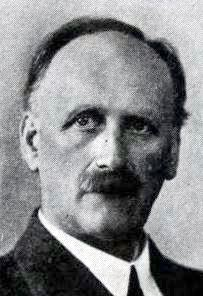
- Born: Ole Michael Ludvigsen Selberg; 7 October 1877; Eikefjord, Norway
- Died: 11 December 1950 (aged 73); Voss, Norway
- Occupations: Mathematician and educator
- Spouse: Anna Kristina Brigtsdatter Skeie
- Children: Sigmund Selberg; Arne Selberg; Henrik Selberg; Atle Selberg

Ole Michael Ludvigsen Selberg (7 October 1877 – 11 December 1950) was a Norwegian mathematician and educator. He was born in the Eikefjord area of the old Kinn Municipality. He was married to Anna Kristina Brigtsdatter Skeie, and the father of Sigmund, Arne, Henrik and Atle Selberg. His thesis from 1925 treated the theory of algebraic equations. Three of his sons became professors of mathematics, and one was professor of engineering. During the occupation of Norway by Nazi Germany Selberg was a member of the Nazi party Nasjonal Samling. He is also known for his large collection of mathematics literature, which has later been donated to the Norwegian University of Science and Technology.
