= Sophus Lie =

Norwegian mathematician (1842–1899)

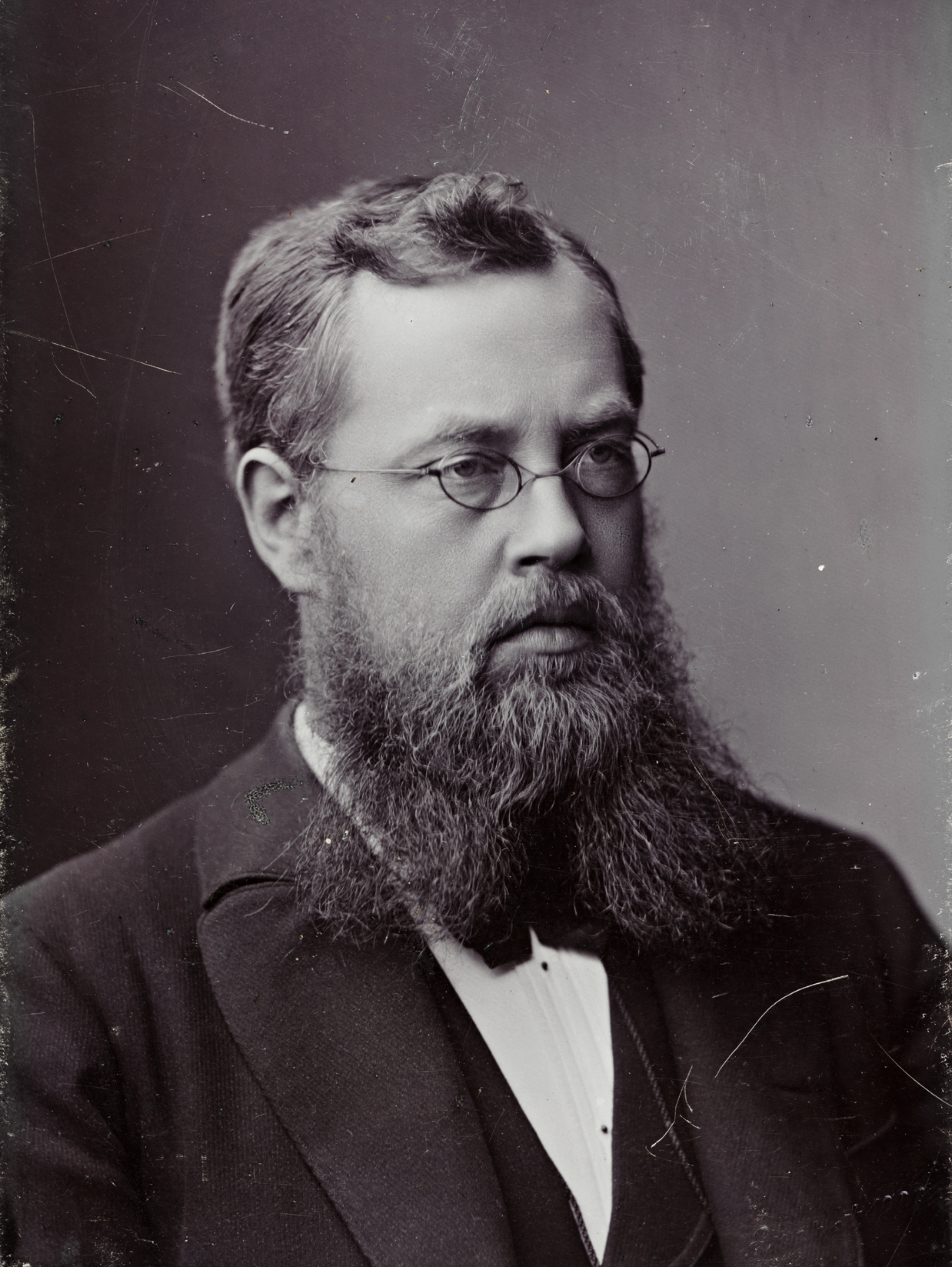
- Lie in 1896
- Born: Marius Sophus Lie; 17 December 1842; Nordfjordeid, Norway
- Died: 18 February 1899 (aged 56); Kristiania, Norway
- Education: Royal Frederick University
- Known for: One-parameter group Differential invariant Contact transformation Infinitesimal transformation W-curve; Carathéodory–Jacobi–Lie theorem Lie algebra Lie bracket Lie group Lie product formula Lie sphere geometry Lie theory Lie transform Lie's theorem Lie's third theorem Lie–Kolchin theorem See full list
- Awards: Lobachevsky Medal (1897); ForMemRS (1895)
- Scientific career
- Fields: Mathematics
- Workplaces: Royal Frederick University; University of Leipzig
- Doctoral advisor: Carl Anton Bjerknes; Cato Maximilian Guldberg
- Doctoral students: Hans Blichfeldt; Lucjan Emil Böttcher; Gerhard Kowalewski; Kazimierz Żorawski; Élie Cartan; Elling Holst; Edgar Odell Lovett

Marius Sophus Lie (/liː/ LEE; Norwegian: [liː]; 17 December 1842 – 18 February 1899) was a Norwegian mathematician. He largely created the theory of continuous symmetry and applied it to the study of geometry and differential equations. He also made substantial contributions to the development of algebra.

== Life and career ==
Marius Sophus Lie was born on 17 December 1842 in the small town of Nordfjordeid. He was the youngest of six children born to Lutheran pastor Johann Herman Lie and his wife, who came from a well-known Trondheim family.

He had his primary education in the south-eastern coast of Moss, before attending high school in Oslo (known then as Christiania). After graduating from high school, his ambition towards a military career was dashed when the army rejected him due to poor eyesight. He then enrolled at the Royal Frederick University.

Sophus Lie's first mathematical work, Repräsentation der Imaginären der Plangeometrie (Representations of the Imaginaries in Plane Geometry), was published in 1869 by the Academy of Sciences in Christiania and also by Crelle's Journal. That same year he received a scholarship and travelled to Berlin, where he stayed from September to February 1870. There, he met Felix Klein and they became close friends. When he left Berlin, Lie travelled to Paris, where he was joined by Klein two months later. There, they met Camille Jordan and Gaston Darboux. But on 19 July 1870 the Franco-Prussian War began and Klein (who was Prussian) had to leave France very quickly. Lie left for Fontainebleau where he was arrested, suspected of being a German spy, garnering him fame in Norway. He was released from prison after a month, thanks to the intervention of Darboux.

Lie obtained his PhD at the Royal Frederick University (in present-day Oslo) in 1871 with a thesis entitled Over en Classe geometriske Transformationer (On a Class of Geometric Transformations). It would be described by Darboux as "one of the most handsome discoveries of modern Geometry". The next year, the Norwegian Parliament established an extraordinary professorship for him. That same year, Lie visited Klein, who was then at Erlangen and working on the Erlangen program.

In 1872, Lie spent eight months together with Peter Ludwig Mejdell Sylow, editing and publishing the mathematical works of their countryman, Niels Henrik Abel.

At the end of 1872, Sophus Lie proposed to Anna Birch, then eighteen years old, and they were married in 1874. The couple had three children: Marie (b. 1877), Dagny (b. 1880) and Herman (b. 1884).

From 1876, he co-edited the journal Archiv for Mathematik og Naturvidenskab, together with the physician Jacob Worm-Müller, and the biologist Georg Ossian Sars.

In 1884, Friedrich Engel arrived at Christiania to help him, with the support of Klein and Adolph Mayer (who were both professors at Leipzig by then). Engel would help Lie to write his most important treatise, Theorie der Transformationsgruppen, published in Leipzig in three volumes from 1888 to 1893. Decades later, Engel would also be one of the two editors of Lie's collected works.

In 1886, Lie became a professor at Leipzig, replacing Klein, who had moved to Göttingen. In November 1889, Lie suffered a mental breakdown and had to be hospitalized until June 1890. Subsequently he returned to his post, but over the years his anemia progressed to the point where he returned to his homeland. In May 1898 he tendered his resignation, and he left for home in September the same year. He died in 1899 at the age of 56, due to pernicious anemia, a disease caused by impaired absorption of vitamin B_{12}.

He was made Honorary Member of the London Mathematical Society in 1878, Corresponding Member of the French Academy of Sciences in 1892, honorary member of the Manchester Literary and Philosophical Society 1894, Foreign Member of the Royal Society of London in 1895 and foreign associate of the National Academy of Sciences of the United States of America in 1895.

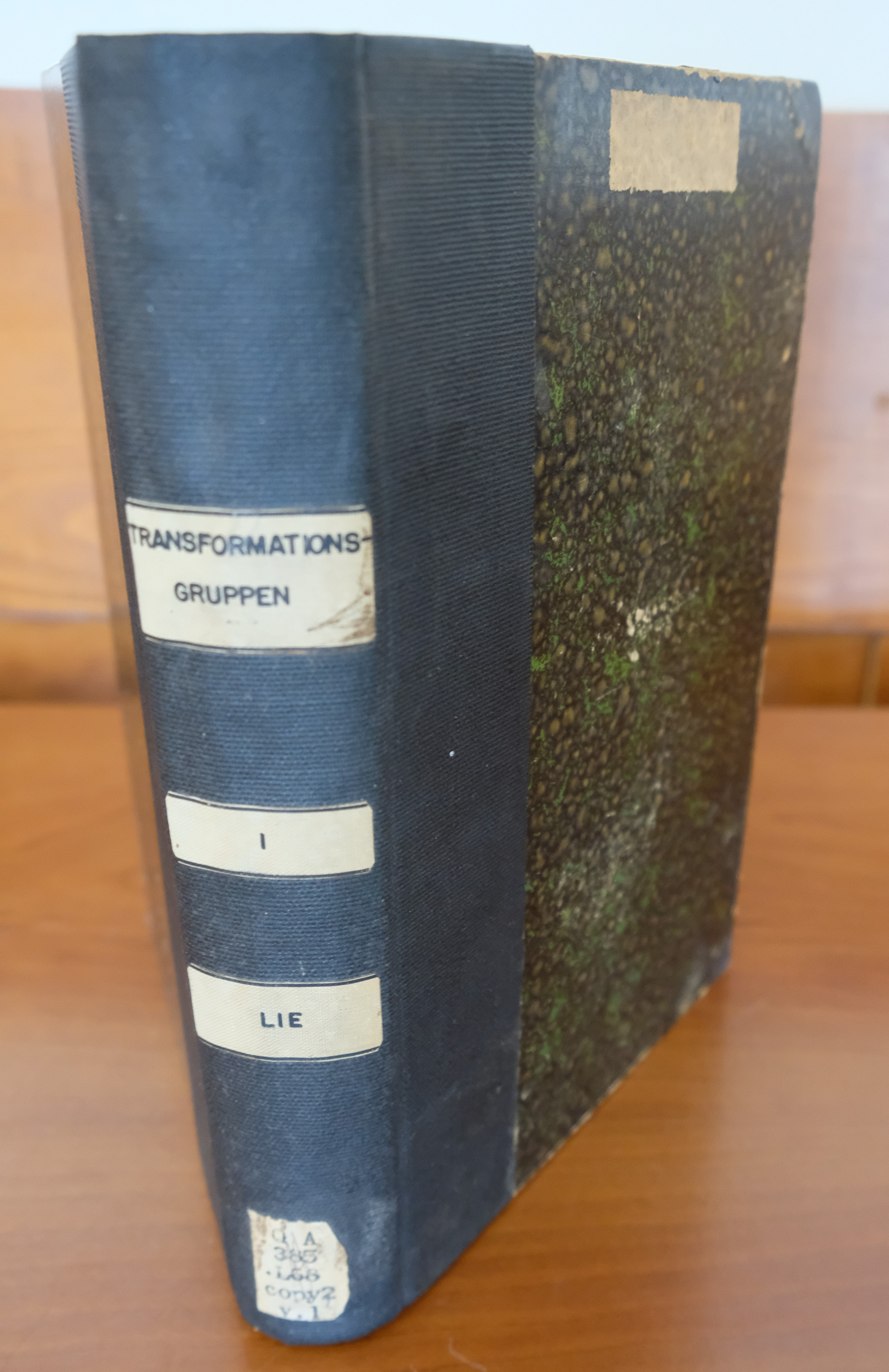
1888 copy of "Theorie der Transformationsgruppen," volume I

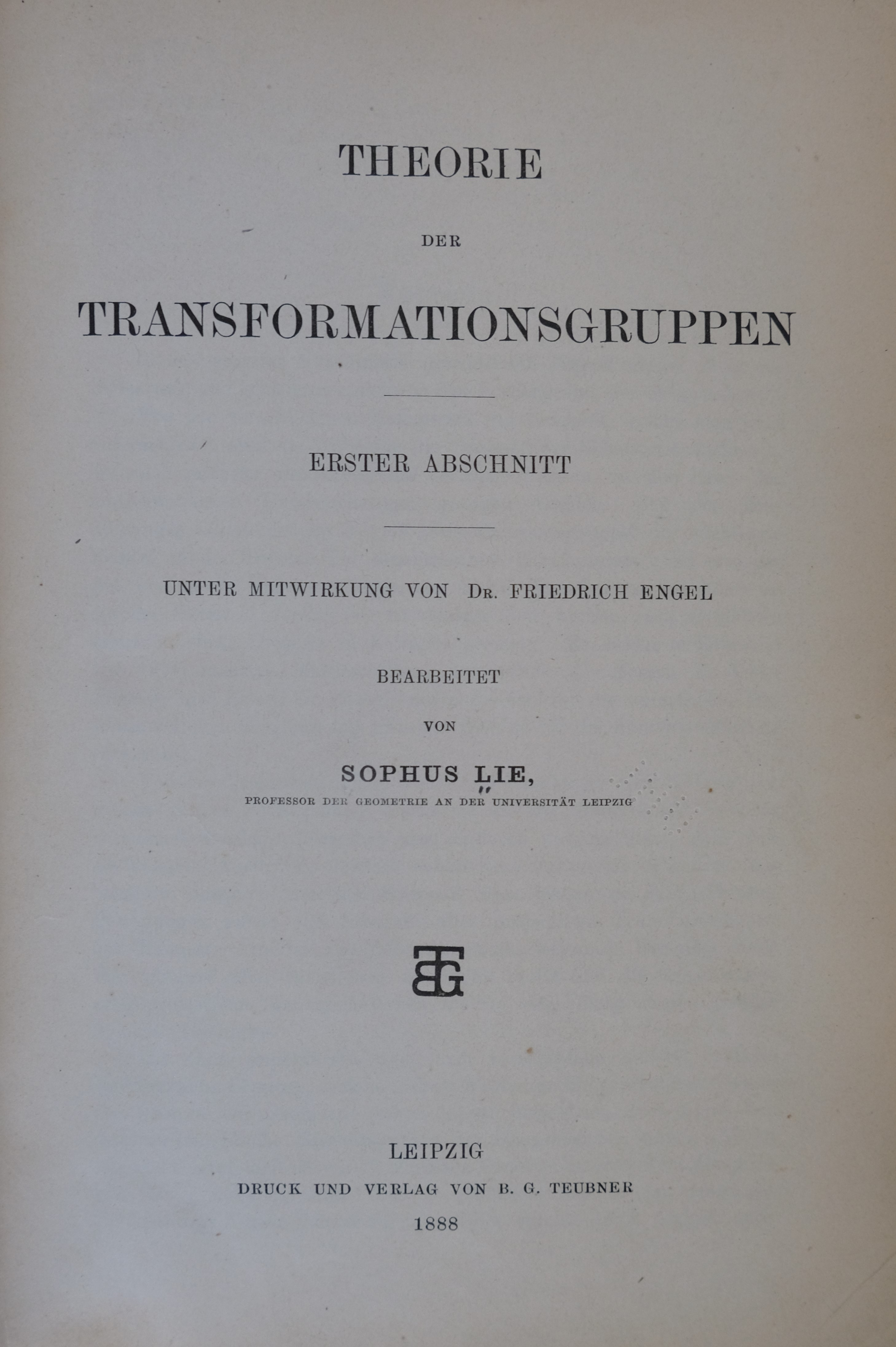
Title page to "Theorie der Transformationsgruppen"

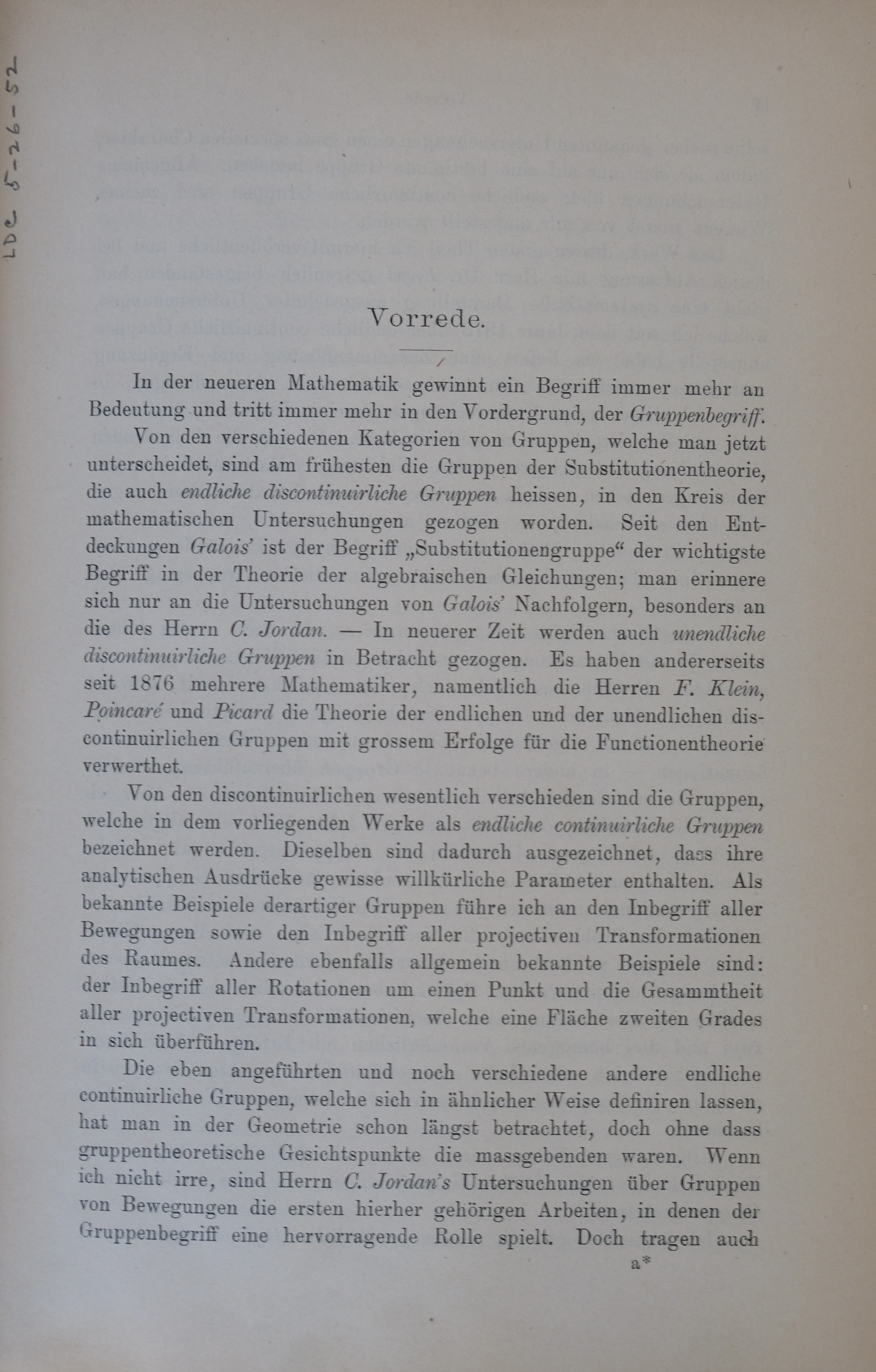
Preface to "Theorie der Transformationsgruppen"

== Legacy ==
Lie's principal tool, and one of his greatest achievements, was the discovery that continuous transformation groups (now called, after him, Lie groups) could be better understood by "linearizing" them, and studying the corresponding generating vector fields (the so-called infinitesimal generators). The generators are subject to a linearized version of the group law, now called the commutator bracket, and have the structure of what is today called a Lie algebra.

Hermann Weyl used Lie's work on group theory in his papers from 1922 and 1923, and Lie groups today play a role in quantum mechanics. However, the subject of Lie groups as it is studied today is vastly different from what the research by Sophus Lie was about and "among the 19th century masters, Lie's work is in detail certainly the least known today".

Sophus Lie was an eager proponent in the establishment of the Abel Prize. Inspired by the Nansen fund named after Fridtjof Nansen, and the lack of a prize for mathematics in the Nobel Prize, he gathered support for the establishment of an award for outstanding work in pure mathematics.

Lie advised many doctoral students who went on to become successful mathematicians. Élie Cartan became widely regarded as one of the greatest mathematicians of the 20th century. Kazimierz Żorawski's work was proved to be of importance to a variety of fields. Hans Frederick Blichfeldt made contributions to various fields of mathematics.

== Books ==
- Lie, Sophus (1888), Theorie der Transformationsgruppen I (in German), Leipzig: B. G. Teubner. Written with the help of Friedrich Engel. English translation available: Edited and translated from the German and with a foreword by Joël Merker, see ISBN 978-3-662-46210-2 and arXiv:1003.3202
- Lie, Sophus (1890), Theorie der Transformationsgruppen II (in German), Leipzig: B. G. Teubner. Written with the help of Friedrich Engel.
- Lie, Sophus (1891), Vorlesungen über differentialgleichungen mit bekannten infinitesimalen transformationen (in German), Leipzig: B. G. Teubner. Written with the help of Georg Scheffers.
- Lie, Sophus (1893), Vorlesungen über continuierliche Gruppen (in German), Leipzig: B. G. Teubner. Written with the help of Georg Scheffers.
- Lie, Sophus (1893), Theorie der Transformationsgruppen III (in German), Leipzig: B. G. Teubner. Written with the help of Friedrich Engel.
- Lie, Sophus (1896), Geometrie der Berührungstransformationen (in German), Leipzig: B. G. Teubner. Written with the help of Georg Scheffers.
- Lie, Sophus, Engel, Friedrich; Heegaard, Poul (eds.), Gesammelte Abhandlungen, Leipzig: Teubner; 7 vols., 1922–1960

== See also ==
- Lie derivative
- List of simple Lie groups
- List of things named after Sophus Lie
