= Langesund =

Town in Telemark county, Norway

- Town/City
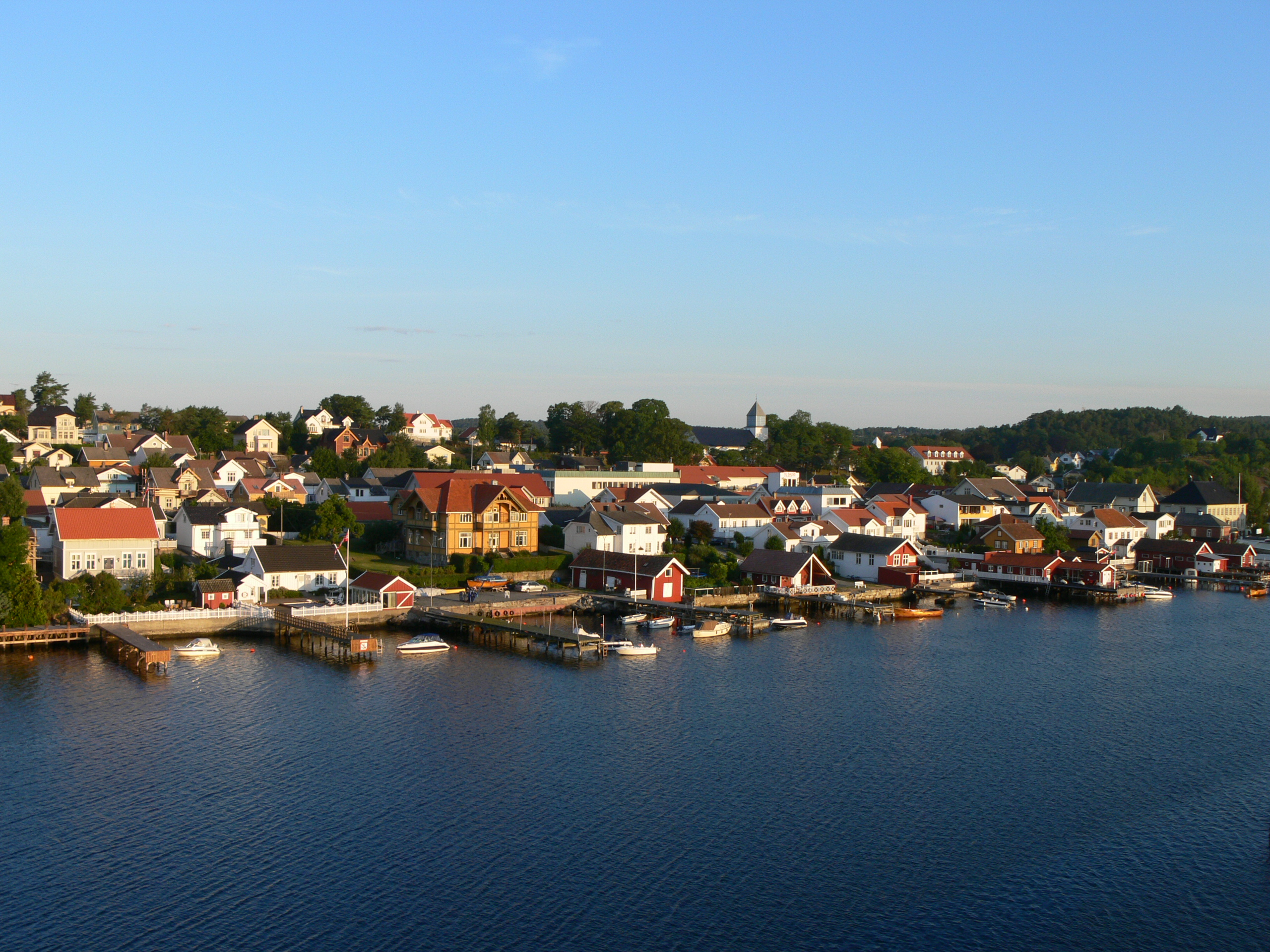
- View of the town
- Interactive map of Langesund
- Coordinates: 59.00066°N 9.74873°E
- Country: Norway
- Region: Eastern Norway
- County: Telemark
- District: Grenland
- Municipality: Bamble Municipality
- Established as
- Ladested: 1765–1963
- Town (By): 1997
- Elevation: 4 m (13 ft)
- Demonym(s): Langesunder; Langesundar
- Time zone: UTC+01:00 (CET)
  - Summer (DST): UTC+02:00 (CEST)
- Post Code: 3970 Langesund
- Former municipality
- Langesund ladested
- Telemark within Norway

- Langesund within Telemark
- Country: Norway
- County: Telemark
- District: Grenland
- Established: 1 Jan 1838
  - Created as: Formannskapsdistrikt
- Disestablished: 1 Jan 1964
  - Succeeded by: Bamble Municipality
- Administrative centre: Langesund

Government
  - Mayor (1951–1963): Anton Baar (Ap)

Area (upon dissolution)
  - Total: 1.3 km^{2} (0.50 sq mi)
  - Rank: #672 in Norway

Population (1963)
  - Total: 2,290
  - Rank: #394 in Norway
  - Density: 1,761.5/km^{2} (4,562/sq mi)
  - Change (10 years): ▲ +5.6%

Official language
  - Norwegian form: Neutral
- Time zone: UTC+01:00 (CET)
  - Summer (DST): UTC+02:00 (CEST)
- ISO 3166 code: NO-0802

Langesund (Norwegian pronunciation: [lɑŋəˌsʉnn]) is the administrative centre of Bamble Municipality in Telemark county, Norway. The town is located on a peninsula along the Langesundsfjorden near the Skagerrak coast. The town of Stathelle lies about 4 kilometres (2.5 mi) to the northwest. The town was established as a ladested in 1765 and on 1 January 1838 it became a self-governing municipality. In 1964, it became part of Bamble Municipality.

For a long time, Langesund and the neighboring town of Stathelle have been grouped together as part of the Porsgrunn/Skien metropolitan area and because of this, the population and area data for this town has not been separately tracked by Statistics Norway. What is tracked, is the portion of the metropolitan area located in Bamble Municipality. In 2025, the Langesund/Stathelle area in Bamble Municipality measured 6.35 square kilometres (1,570 acres) and together they had a population of 10,563.

It is possible to visit the remains of the old Coastal Fortress on Langesundstangen on the extreme end of the Langesund peninsula. The fort was established during the Second World War by Nazi Germany and later used by the Norwegian Coastal Artillery and Home Guard until 1993.

Langesund is one of the most celebrated summer towns in Norway because of the large number of sunny days. It is also well known for Wrightegaarden, a building that hosts outdoor concerts every weekend the whole summer. Artists like Bob Dylan, A-ha, Elton John and Little Richard have played in Wrightegaarden. Langesund marks the border between Ytre Oslofjord and Skagerrak.

== Government ==
In Norway, municipalities are the unit of local government. This means that cities and towns are simply designations for urban areas, but under current Norwegian law, they have no actual government authority. The town of Langesund lies within Bamble Municipality and is therefore governed by the municipal council of Bamble Municipality.

== History ==
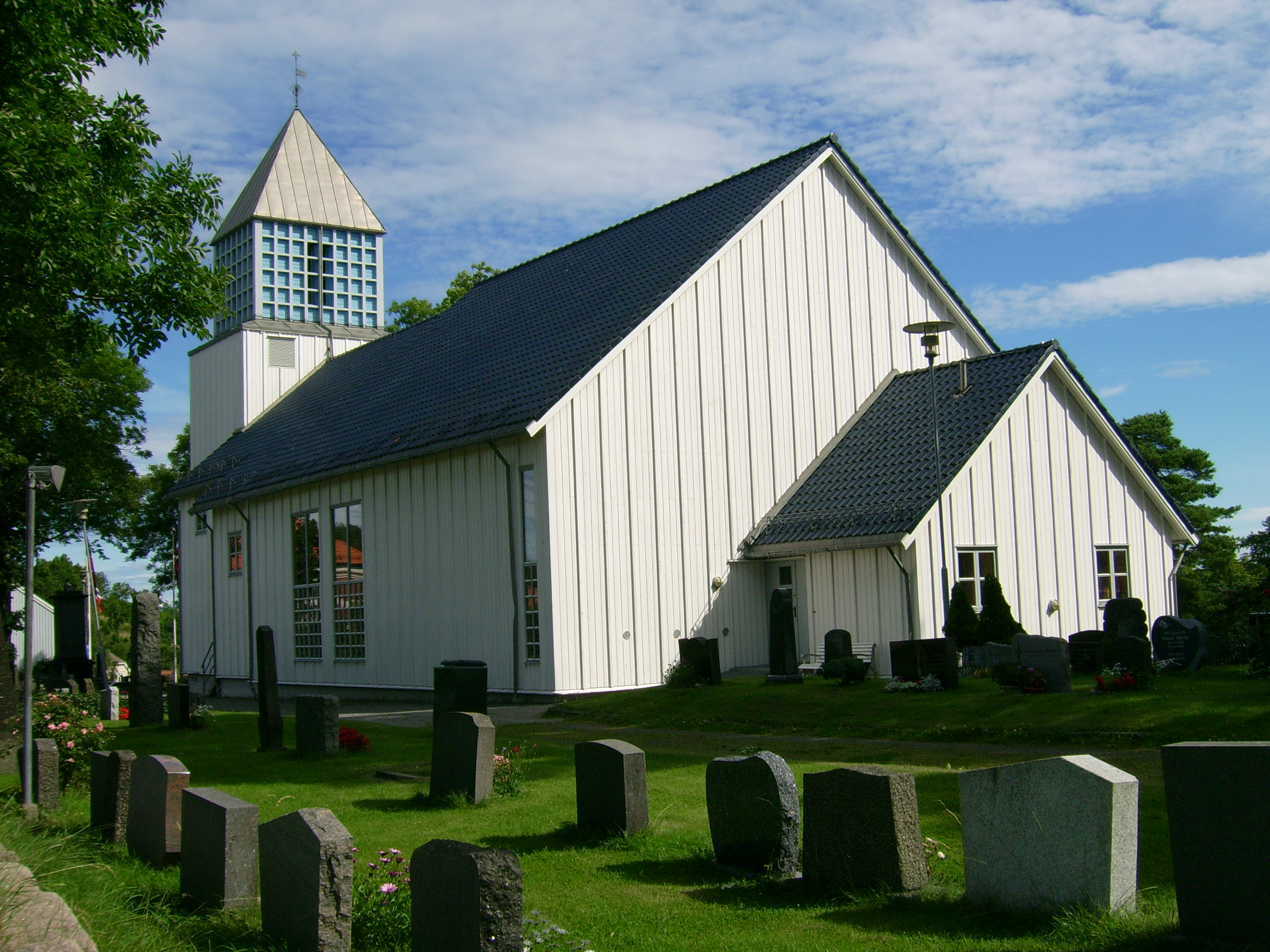
View of the Langesund Church

Langesund became its own customs center in 1570, and in the 1580s was considered the country's largest export port for timber, with a lot of shipping traffic particularly from Dutch schooners. The Dutch also worked on a large salt factory that King Christian IV had built on Langøya in 1602 to refine imported salt. In the early days, Langesund was one of the most important shipping towns in Norway.

In 1765, the growing village was granted rights as a ladested (town status). At the end of the 17th century, large shipbuilding was started. As the timber trade fell away, shipbuilding and shipping became the town's main industries. Peter Wessel Tordenskiold had one of his ships built in Langesund, the Løvendals Gallej. It was known as Longsound in English during the 1800s.

=== Name ===
The town is Langesund which means "the long strait". The first element is lang which means "long". The last element is sund which means "strait" or "sound".

=== Administrative history ===
The formannskapsdistrikt law of 1837 created a system of local government in Norway by establishing each town or city (ladested or kjøpstad) and each Church of Norway prestegjeld as a civil municipality. On 1 January 1838, the ladested of Langesund was established as Langesund Municipality.

On 1 January 1878, the island of Langøya, just off shore from the town (population: 22) was transferred from the neighboring Bamble Municipality to the town of Langesund. In 1949, the town was enlarged by annexing an adjacent area of Bamble Municipality (population: 127).

During the 1960s, there were many municipal mergers across Norway due to the work of the Schei Committee. On 1 January 1964, Langesund Municipality was dissolved and the following areas were merged to form an enlarged Bamble Municipality:

- the town of Langesund (population: 2,281)
- the town of Stathelle (population: 724)
- all of Bamble Municipality (population: 5,237)

=== Municipal self-government (1838–1964) ===
While it existed, Langesund Municipality was responsible for primary education (through 10th grade), outpatient health services, senior citizen services, welfare and other social services, zoning, economic development, and municipal roads and utilities. The municipality was governed by a municipal council of directly elected representatives. The mayor was indirectly elected by a vote of the municipal council. The municipality was under the jurisdiction of the Bamble District Court and the Agder Court of Appeal.

==== Mayors ====
The mayor (Norwegian: ordfører) of Langesund Municipality was the political leader of the municipality and the chairperson of the municipal council. The following people have held this position:

- 1838–18??: Ditlev Myhre Møller
- 18??–18??: Johan August Thrane
- 1847–18??: Immanuel Møller
- 1855–18??: J.C. Knudsen
- 18??–18??: Jørgen Wright
- 18??–18??: H.N. Gundersen
- 1862–1863: N.B. Petersen
- 1864–1864: Fredrik Feilberg
- 18??–18??: Andreas J. Mølbach
- 18??–18??: Just Wright
- 18??–18??: Christian Høy
- 1879–1881: Johan Mølbach
- 18??–18??: M.K. Brogaard
- 1884–1886: Georg Jessen Hansen
- 1886–1887: Hans P. Jacobsen
- 1887–1891: Andreas Corneliussen
- 1892–1896: Herman Skougaard (H)
- 1897–1898: Andreas Corneliussen
- 1898–1902: Fredrik Hegge (V)
- 1902–1913: Herman Skougaard (H)
- 1913–1914: Fredrik Hegge (V)
- 1915–1916: Nils G. Willumsen
- 1916–1919: Jacob Solgaard
- 1919–1922: Daniel Grønn-Nilsen
- 1922–1925: Johannes A. Hellstrøm (V)
- 1925–1931: Hans Jacobsen
- 1931–1932: Thorleif Thorsen
- 1932–1934: Hans Jacobsen
- 1935–1940: Thoralf M. Nilsen (Ap)
- 1941–1941: Sven Svendsen (NS)
- 1941–1945: Erling Ruud (NS)
- 1945–1945: Thoralf M. Nilsen (Ap)
- 1946–1946: Carl Olsen (V)
- 1947–1951: Markus Olsen (V)
- 1951–1963: Anton Baar (Ap)

==== Municipal council ====
The municipal council (Bystyre) of Langesund was made up of 21 representatives that were elected to four year terms. The tables below show the historical composition of the council by political party.

Langesund bystyre 1959–1963
Party name (in Norwegian)	Number of representatives
Labour Party (Arbeiderpartiet)	11
Conservative Party (Høyre)	3
Christian Democratic Party (Kristelig Folkeparti)	2
Liberal Party (Venstre)	5
Total number of members:	21
Note: On 1 January 1964, Langesund Municipality became part of Bamble Municipality.

Langesund bystyre 1955–1959
Party name (in Norwegian)	Number of representatives
Labour Party (Arbeiderpartiet)	12
Christian Democratic Party (Kristelig Folkeparti)	2
Liberal Party (Venstre)	4
Local List(s) (Lokale lister)	3
Total number of members:	21

Langesund bystyre 1951–1955
Party name (in Norwegian)	Number of representatives
Labour Party (Arbeiderpartiet)	10
Christian Democratic Party (Kristelig Folkeparti)	2
Liberal Party (Venstre)	5
Local List(s) (Lokale lister)	3
Total number of members:	20

Langesund bystyre 1947–1951
Party name (in Norwegian)	Number of representatives
Labour Party (Arbeiderpartiet)	8
Communist Party (Kommunistiske Parti)	1
Christian Democratic Party (Kristelig Folkeparti)	2
Liberal Party (Venstre)	6
Joint List(s) of Non-Socialist Parties (Borgerlige Felleslister)	3
Total number of members:	20

Langesund bystyre 1945–1947
Party name (in Norwegian)	Number of representatives
Labour Party (Arbeiderpartiet)	8
Communist Party (Kommunistiske Parti)	1
Christian Democratic Party (Kristelig Folkeparti)	2
Liberal Party (Venstre)	5
Local List(s) (Lokale lister)	4
Total number of members:	20

Langesund bystyre 1937–1941*
Party name (in Norwegian)	Number of representatives
Labour Party (Arbeiderpartiet)	10
Liberal Party (Venstre)	5
Joint List(s) of Non-Socialist Parties (Borgerlige Felleslister)	5
Total number of members:	20
Note: Due to the German occupation of Norway during World War II, no elections were held for new municipal councils until after the war ended in 1945.

Langesund bystyre 1935–1937
Party name (in Norwegian)	Number of representatives
Labour Party (Arbeiderpartiet)	9
Liberal Party (Venstre)	6
Joint List(s) of Non-Socialist Parties (Borgerlige Felleslister)	5
Total number of members:	20

== Attractions ==
The best-known landmark in Langesund is the Langøytangen Lighthouse, a lighthouse placed on the peak of Langøya, a kilometre-long island right outside of Langesund. The island group east of the town are called Arøya.

A short walk outside of the town centre, facing the Skagerrak strait, lies the decommissioned military fort known as Tangen Fortress.

== Notable people ==
- Atle Selberg, a mathematician
- Vidar Busk, a musician
- Marcus Olaus Bockman, a Norwegian-American Lutheran theologian

== Media gallery ==
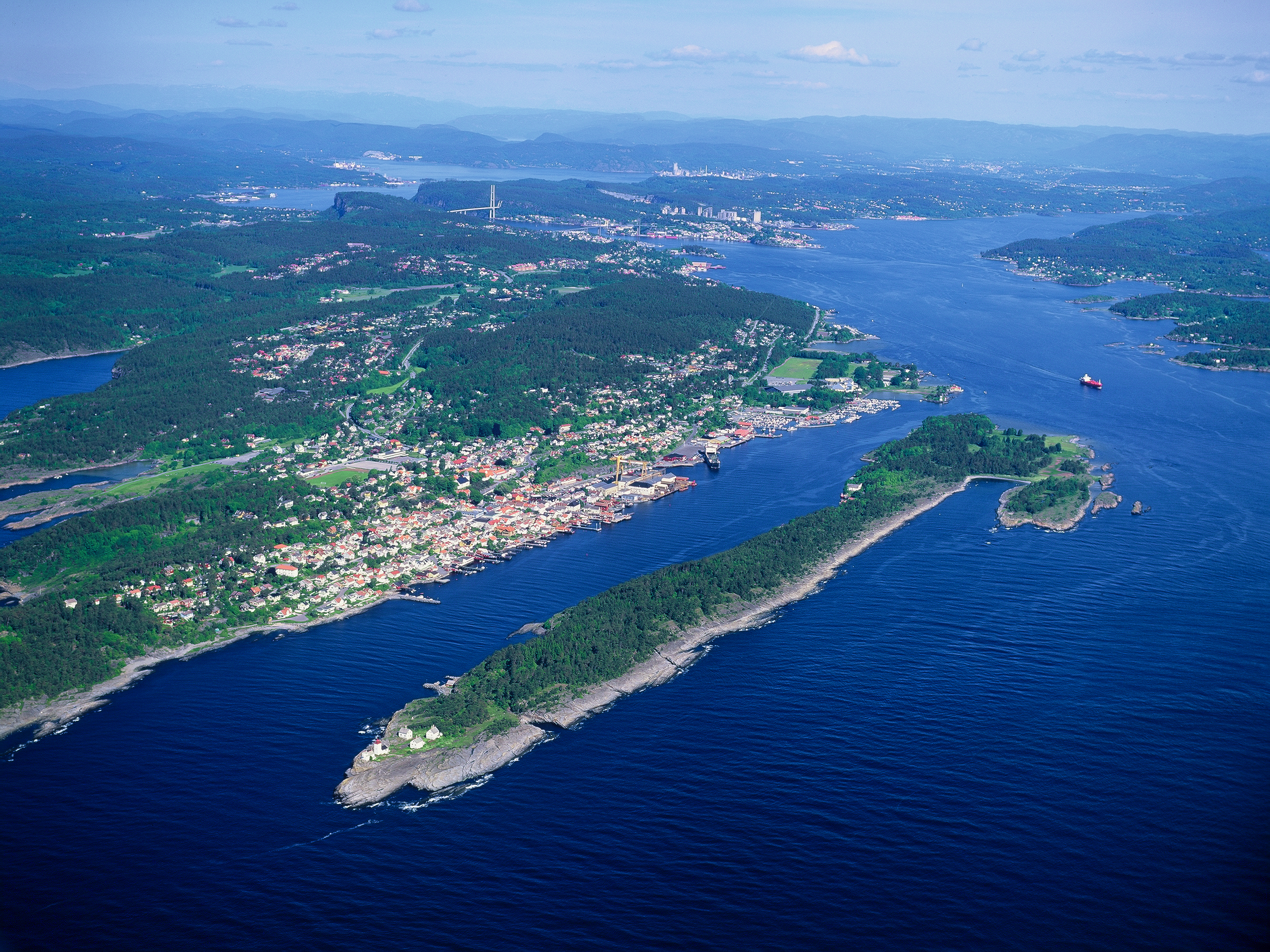
Aerial view of Langesund and the island of Langøya

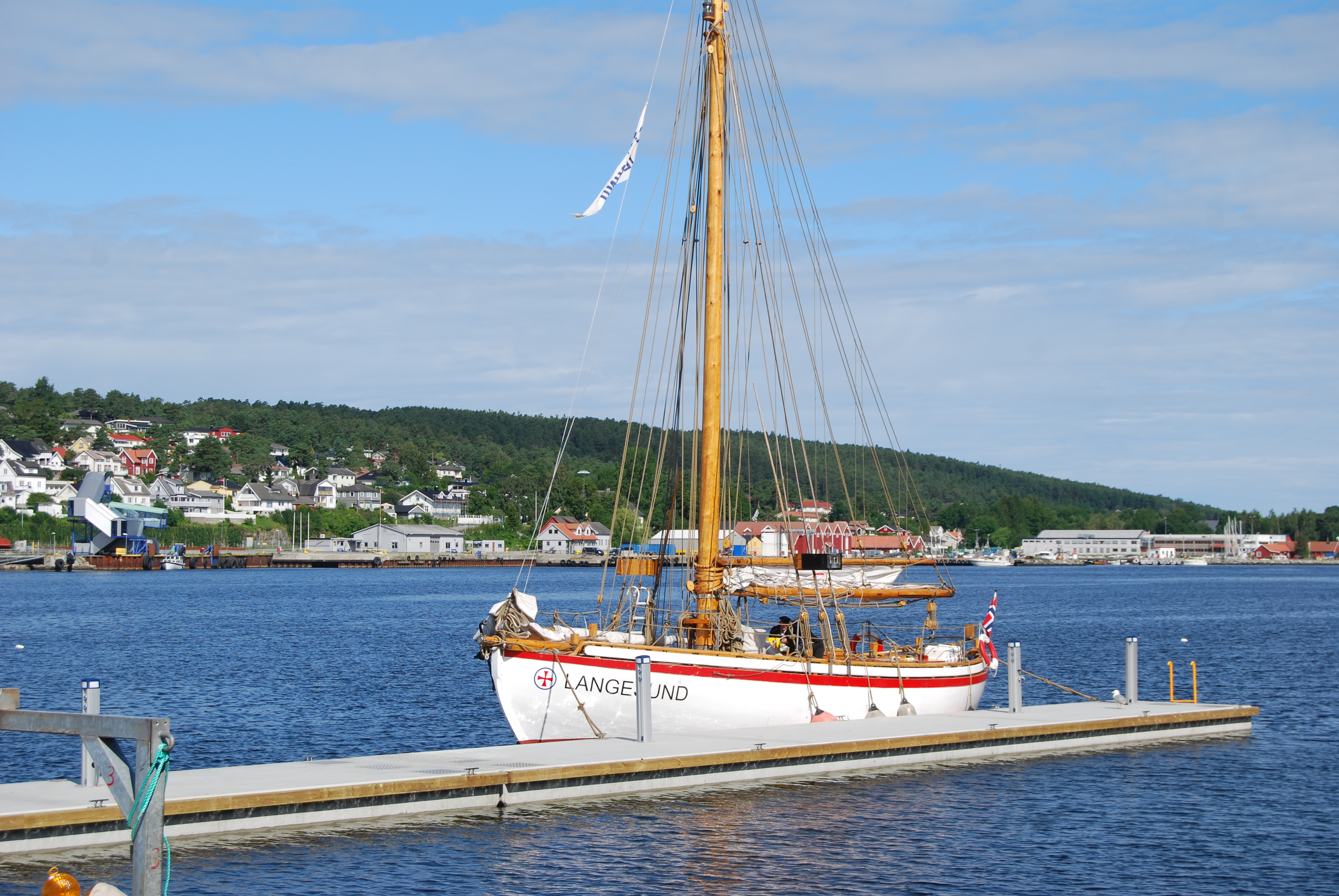
View of the town

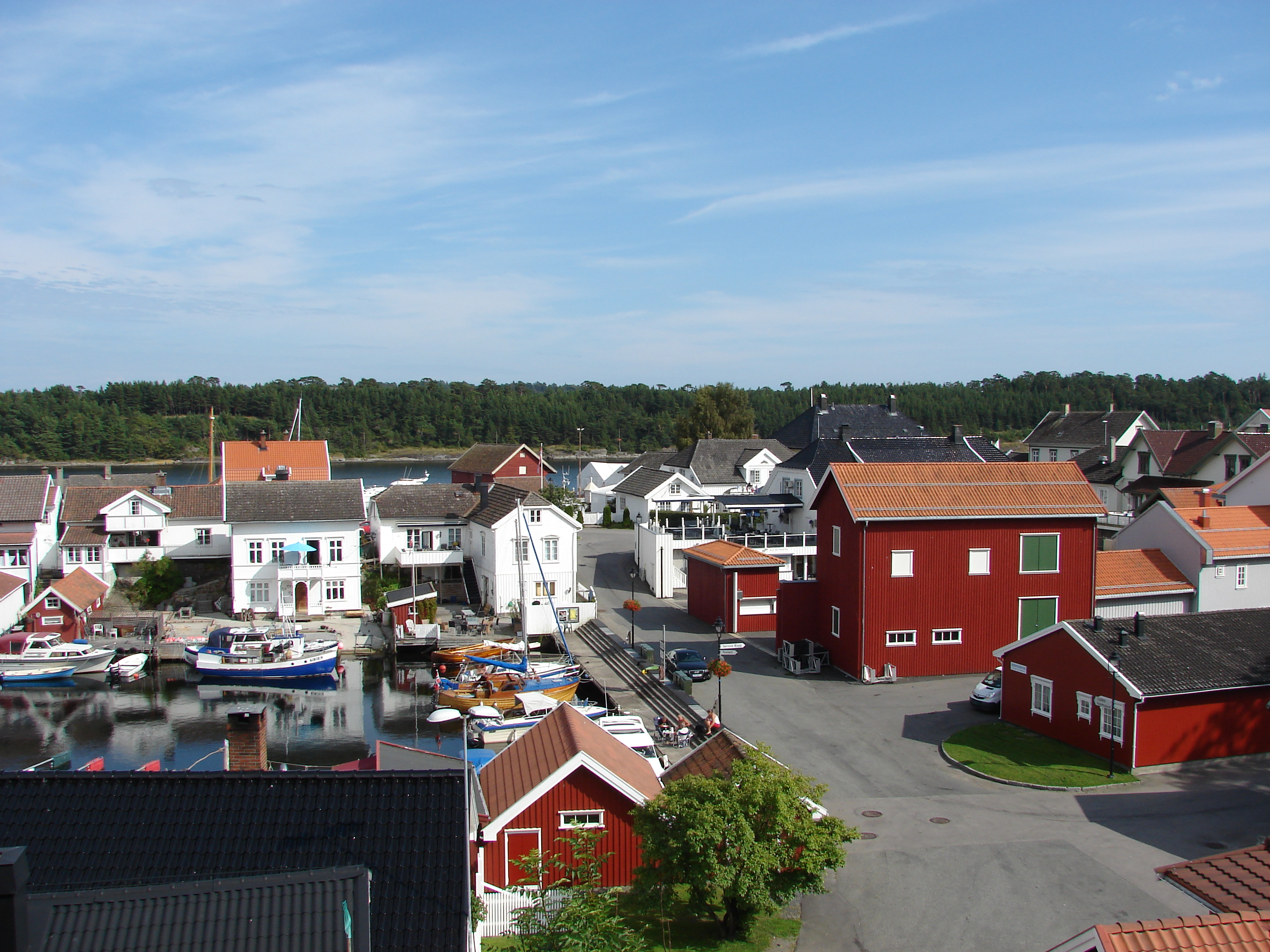
Harbour area

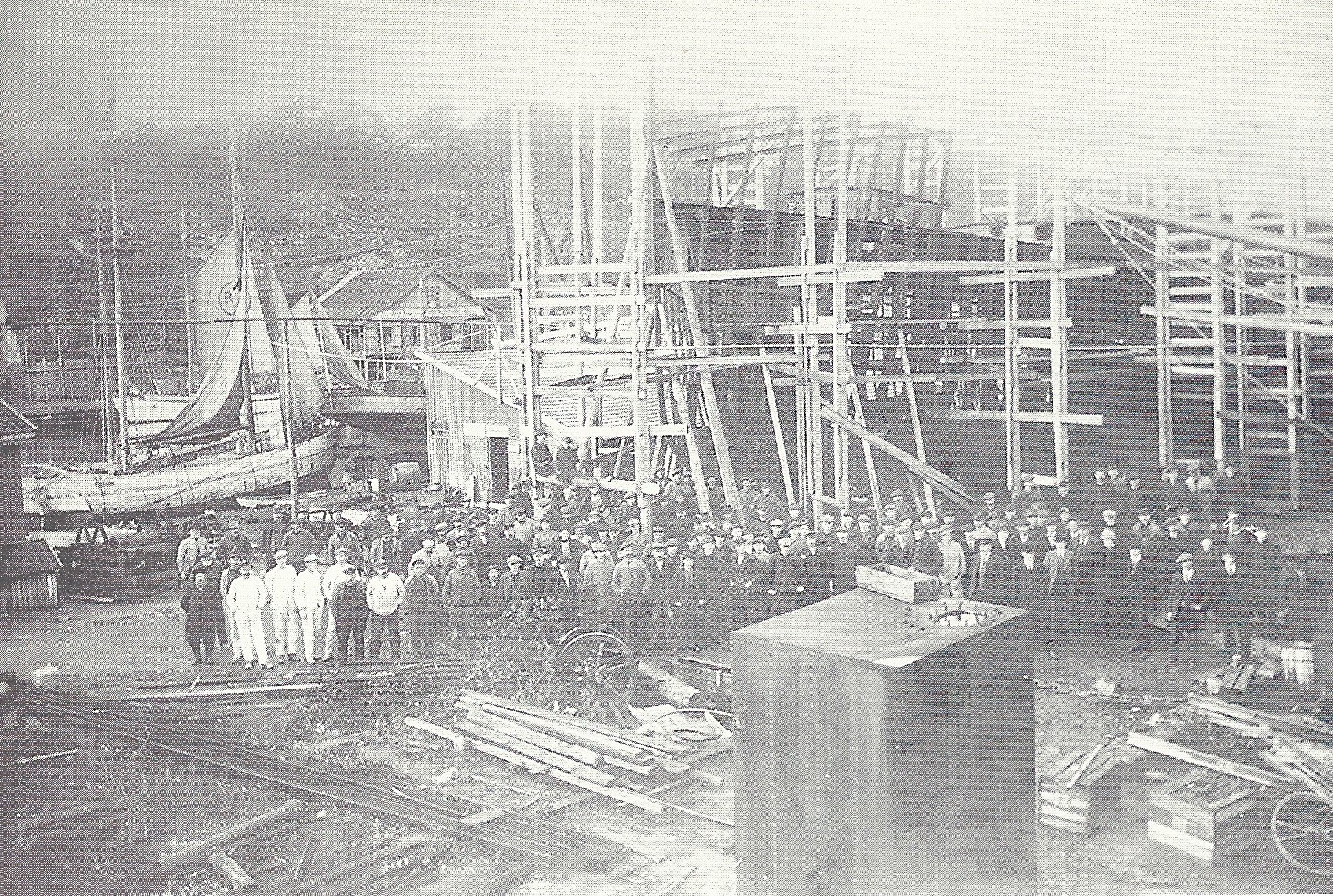
Old shipyard in Langesund

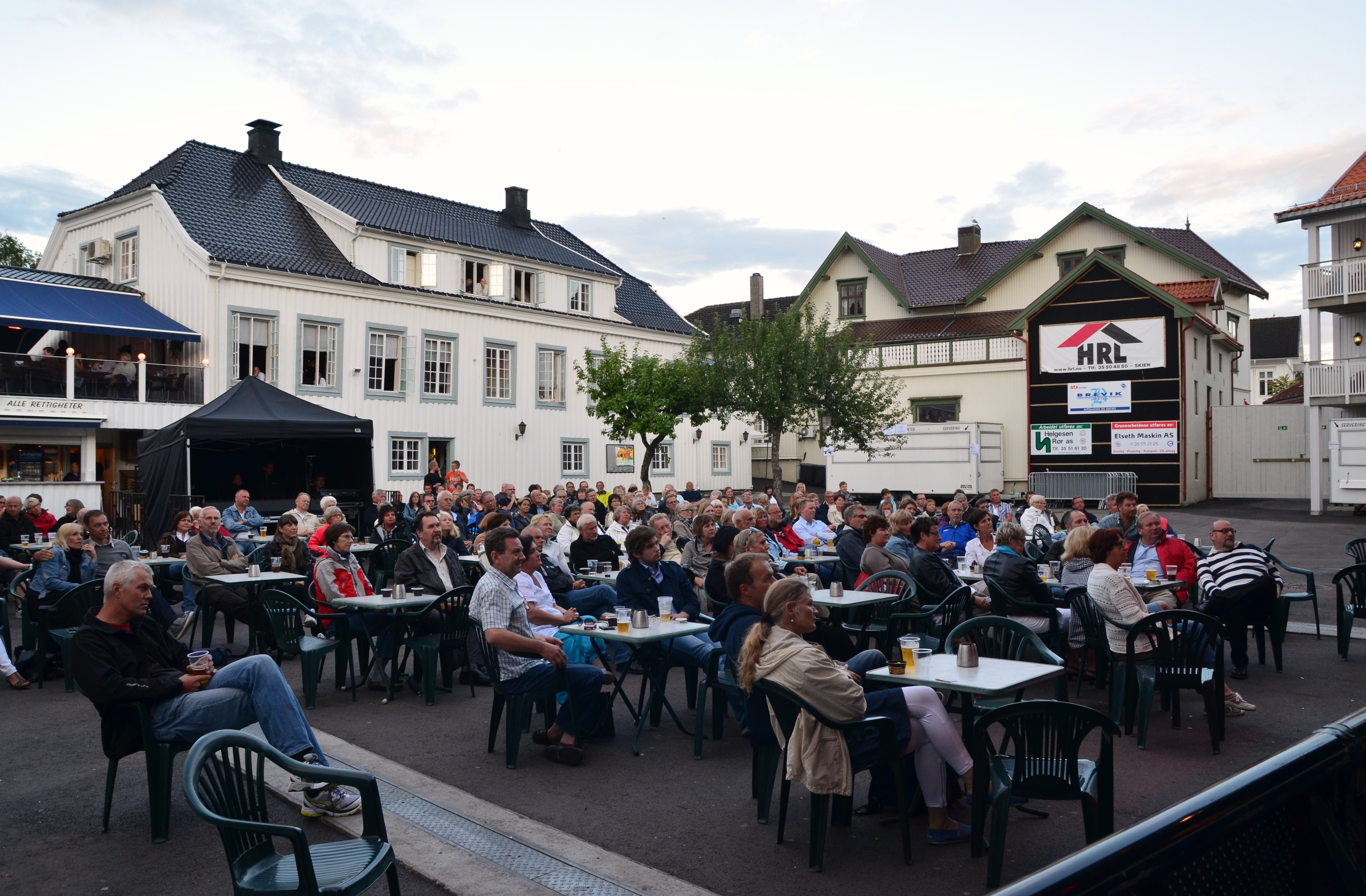
Wrightgaarden in Langesund

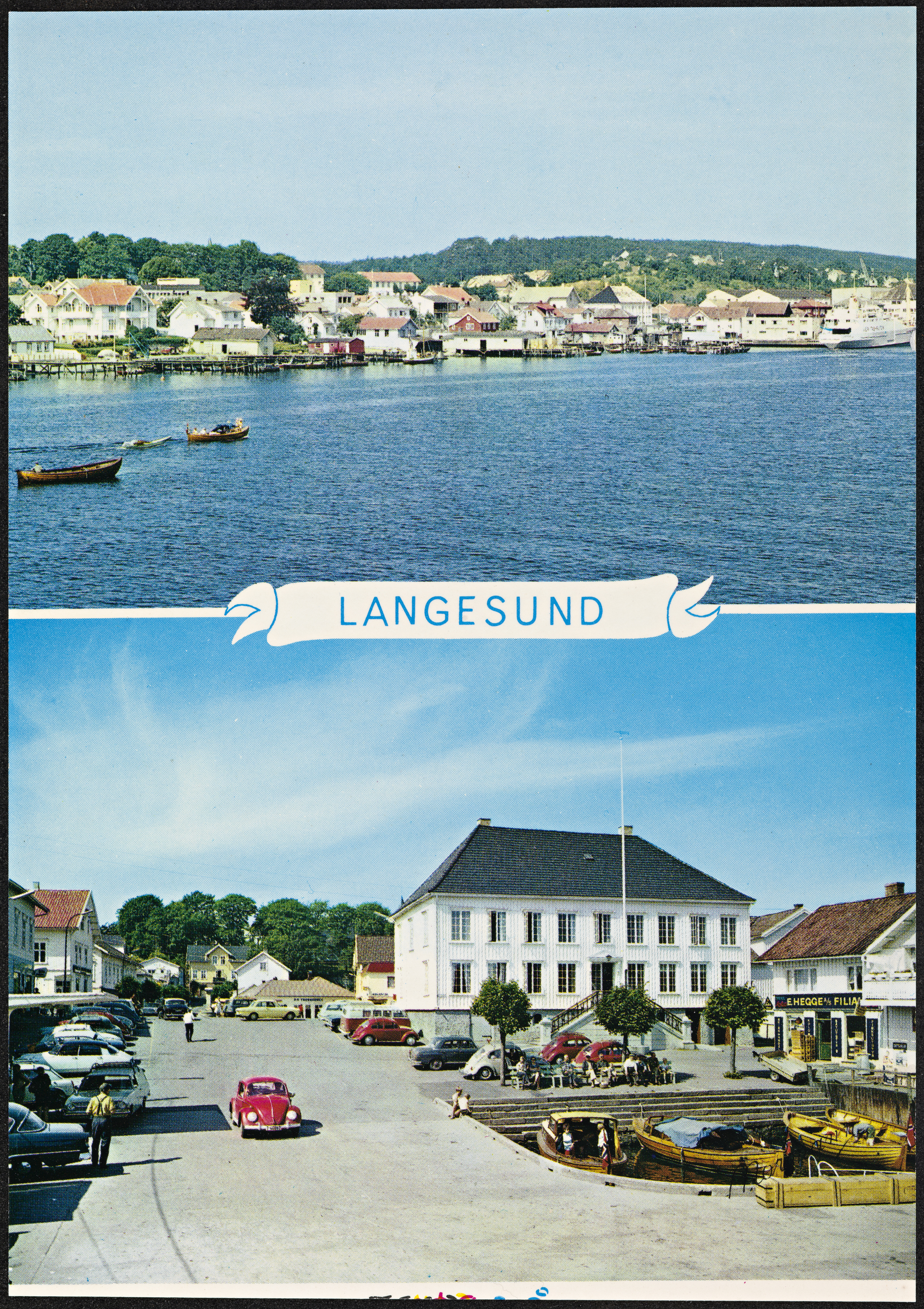
Postcards of Langesund (c. 1960s)

== See also ==
- List of towns and cities in Norway
- List of former municipalities of Norway
