= Lie point symmetry =

Lie point symmetry is a concept in advanced mathematics. Towards the end of the nineteenth century, Sophus Lie introduced the notion of Lie group in order to study the solutions of ordinary differential equations (ODEs). He showed the following main property: the order of an ordinary differential equation can be reduced by one if it is invariant under one-parameter Lie group of point transformations. This observation unified and extended the available integration techniques. Lie devoted the remainder of his mathematical career to developing these continuous groups that have now an impact on many areas of mathematically based sciences. The applications of Lie groups to differential systems were mainly established by Lie and Emmy Noether, and then advocated by Élie Cartan.

Roughly speaking, a Lie point symmetry of a system is a local group of transformations that maps every solution of the system to another solution of the same system. In other words, it maps the solution set of the system to itself. Elementary examples of Lie groups are translations, rotations and scalings.

The Lie symmetry theory is a well-known subject. In it are discussed continuous symmetries opposed to, for example, discrete symmetries. The literature for this theory can be found, among other places, in these notes.

== Overview ==
=== Types of symmetries ===
Lie groups and hence their infinitesimal generators can be naturally "extended" to act on the space of independent variables, state variables (dependent variables) and derivatives of the state variables up to any finite order. There are many other kinds of symmetries. For example, contact transformations let coefficients of the transformations infinitesimal generator depend also on first derivatives of the coordinates. Lie-Bäcklund transformations let them involve derivatives up to an arbitrary order. The possibility of the existence of such symmetries was recognized by Noether. For Lie point symmetries, the coefficients of the infinitesimal generators depend only on coordinates, denoted by $Z$.

=== Applications ===
Lie symmetries were introduced by Lie in order to solve ordinary differential equations. Another application of symmetry methods is to reduce systems of differential equations, finding equivalent systems of differential equations of simpler form. This is called reduction. In the literature, one can find the classical reduction process, and the moving frame-based reduction process. Also symmetry groups can be used for classifying different symmetry classes of solutions.

== Geometrical framework ==
=== Infinitesimal approach ===
Lie's fundamental theorems underline that Lie groups can be characterized by elements known as infinitesimal generators. These mathematical objects form a Lie algebra of infinitesimal generators. Deduced "infinitesimal symmetry conditions" (defining equations of the symmetry group) can be explicitly solved in order to find the closed form of symmetry groups, and thus the associated infinitesimal generators.

Let $Z=(z_1,\dots,z_n)$ be the set of coordinates on which a system is defined where $n$ is the cardinality of $Z$. An infinitesimal generator $\delta$ in the field $\mathbb{R}(Z)$ is a linear operator $\delta : \mathbb{R}(Z)\rightarrow \mathbb{R}(Z)$ that has $\mathbb{R}$ in its kernel and that satisfies the Leibniz rule:

$$\forall (f_1,f_2) \in \mathbb{R}(Z)^2, \delta f_1 f_2 = f_1 \delta f_2 + f_2 \delta f_1$$.

In the canonical basis of elementary derivations $\left\{\frac{\partial}{\partial z_1},\dots,\frac{\partial}{\partial z_n}\right \}$, it is written as:

$$\delta = \sum_{i=1}^{n} \xi_{z_i}(Z) \frac{\partial}{\partial z_i}$$

where $\xi_{z_i}$ is in $\mathbb{R}(Z)$ for all $i$ in $\left\{1,\dots,n\right\}$.

=== Lie groups and Lie algebras of infinitesimal generators ===
Lie algebras can be generated by a generating set of infinitesimal generators as defined above. To every Lie group, one can associate a Lie algebra. Roughly, a Lie algebra $\mathfrak{g}$ is an algebra constituted by a vector space equipped with Lie bracket as additional operation. The base field of a Lie algebra depends on the concept of invariant. Here only finite-dimensional Lie algebras are considered.

=== Continuous dynamical systems ===
A dynamical system (or flow) is a one-parameter group action. Let us denote by $\mathcal{D}$ such a dynamical system, more precisely, a (left-)action of a group $(G,+)$ on a manifold $M$:

$$\begin{array}{rccc}
\mathcal{D} : & G\times M & \rightarrow & M \\
& \nu \times Z & \rightarrow & \mathcal{D}(\nu,Z)
\end{array}$$

such that for all point $Z$ in $M$:

- $\mathcal{D}(e,Z)=Z$ where $e$ is the neutral element of $G$;
- for all $(\nu, \hat{\nu})$ in $G^2$, $\mathcal{D}(\nu,\mathcal{D}(\hat{\nu},Z))=\mathcal{D}(\nu+\hat{\nu},Z)$.

A continuous dynamical system is defined on a group $G$ that can be identified to $\mathbb{R}$ i.e. the group elements are continuous.

=== Invariants ===
An invariant, roughly speaking, is an element that does not change under a transformation. Group-invariant can be found by means of applications to partial differential equations (PDE).

== Definition of Lie point symmetries ==
In this paragraph, we consider precisely expanded Lie point symmetries i.e. we work in an expanded space meaning that the distinction between independent variable, state variables and parameters are avoided as much as possible.

A symmetry group of a system is a continuous dynamical system defined on a local Lie group $G$ acting on a manifold $M$. For the sake of clarity, we restrict ourselves to n-dimensional real manifolds $M=\mathbb{R}^n$ where $n$ is the number of system coordinates.

=== Lie point symmetries of algebraic systems ===
Let us define algebraic systems used in the forthcoming symmetry definition.

==== Algebraic systems ====
Let $F=(f_1,\dots,f_k)=(p_1/q_1,\dots,p_k/q_k)$ be a finite set of rational functions over the field $\mathbb{R}$ where $p_i$ and $q_i$ are polynomials in $\mathbb{R}[Z]$ i.e. in variables $Z=(z_1,\dots,z_n)$ with coefficients in $\mathbb{R}$. An algebraic system associated to $F$ is defined by the following equalities and inequalities:

$$\begin{array}{ccc}
\left\{
\begin{array}{l}
p_1(Z)= 0, \\
\vdots \\
p_k(Z)=0
\end{array}
\right.& \mbox{and} &
\left\{
\begin{array}{l}
q_1(Z) \neq 0, \\
\vdots \\
q_k(Z) \neq 0.
\end{array}
\right.
\end{array}$$

An algebraic system defined by $F=(f_1,\dots,f_k)$ is regular (a.k.a. smooth) if the system $F$ is of maximal rank $k$, meaning that the Jacobian matrix $(\partial f_i / \partial z_j)$ is of rank $k$ at every solution $Z$ of the associated semi-algebraic variety.

==== Definition of Lie point symmetries ====
The following theorem (see th. 2.8 in ch.2 of) gives necessary and sufficient conditions so that a local Lie group $G$ is a symmetry group of an algebraic system.

Theorem. Let $G$ be a connected local Lie group of a continuous dynamical system acting in the n-dimensional space $\mathbb{R}^n$. Let $F: \mathbb{R}^n \rightarrow \mathbb{R}^k$ with $k \leq n$ define a regular system of algebraic equations:

$$f_i(Z)=0 \quad \forall i \in \{1,\dots,k\}.$$

Then $G$ is a symmetry group of this algebraic system if, and only if,

$$\delta f_i(Z)=0 \quad \forall i\in \{1,\dots,k\} \mbox{ whenever } f_1(Z)=\dots=f_k(Z)=0$$

for every infinitesimal generator $\delta$ in the Lie algebra $\mathfrak{g}$ of $G$.

==== Example ====
Consider the algebraic system defined on a space of 6 variables, namely $Z=(P,Q,a,b,c,l)$ with:

$$\left \{
\begin{array}{l}
f_1(Z)=(1-cP)+bQ + 1, \\
f_2(Z)=aP - lQ +1.
\end{array}
\right .$$

The infinitesimal generator

$$\delta = a(a-1) \dfrac{\partial}{\partial a} + (l+b)\dfrac{\partial}{\partial b}+ (2ac-c)\dfrac{\partial}{\partial c}+(-aP+P)\dfrac{\partial}{\partial P}$$

is associated to one of the one-parameter symmetry groups. It acts on 4 variables, namely $a,b,c$ and $P$. One can easily verify that $\delta f_1 = f_1 -f_2$ and $\delta f_2 = 0$. Thus the relations $\delta f_1 = \delta f_2 = 0$ are satisfied for any $Z$ in $\mathbb{R}^6$ that vanishes the algebraic system.

=== Lie point symmetries of dynamical systems ===
Let us define systems of first-order ODEs used in the forthcoming symmetry definition.

==== Systems of ODEs and associated infinitesimal generators ====
Let $d\cdot / dt$ be a derivation w.r.t. the continuous independent variable $t$. We consider two sets $X=(x_1,\dots,x_k)$ and $\Theta = (\theta_1,\dots,\theta_l)$. The associated coordinate set is defined by $Z=(z_1,\dots,z_n)=(t,x_1,\dots,x_k,\theta_1,\dots,\theta_l)$ and its cardinal is $n=1+k+l$. With these notations, a system of first-order ODEs is a system where:

$$\left \{
\begin{array}{l}
\dfrac{d x_i}{dt} = f_i(Z) \mbox{ with } f_i \in \mathbb{R}(Z) \quad \forall i \in \{1,\dots,k\}, \\
\dfrac{d \theta_j}{dt} = 0 \quad \forall j \in \{1,\dots,l\}
\end{array}
\right .$$

and the set $F=(f_1,\dots,f_k)$ specifies the evolution of state variables of ODEs w.r.t. the independent variable. The elements of the set $X$ are called state variables, these of $\Theta$ parameters.

One can associate also a continuous dynamical system to a system of ODEs by resolving its equations.

An infinitesimal generator is a derivation that is closely related to systems of ODEs (more precisely to continuous dynamical systems). For the link between a system of ODEs, the associated vector field and the infinitesimal generator, see section 1.3 of. The infinitesimal generator $\delta$ associated to a system of ODEs, described as above, is defined with the same notations as follows:

$$\delta = \dfrac{\partial}{\partial t} + \sum_{i=1}^{k} f_i(Z) \dfrac{\partial}{\partial x_i}\cdot$$

==== Definition of Lie point symmetries ====
Here is a geometrical definition of such symmetries. Let $\mathcal{D}$ be a continuous dynamical system and $\delta_\mathcal{D}$ its infinitesimal generator. A continuous dynamical system $\mathcal{S}$ is a Lie point symmetry of $\mathcal{D}$ if, and only if, $\mathcal{S}$ sends every orbit of $\mathcal{D}$ to an orbit. Hence, the infinitesimal generator $\delta_\mathcal{S}$ satisfies the following relation based on Lie bracket:

$$[\delta_\mathcal{D}, \delta_\mathcal{S}] = \lambda \delta_\mathcal{D}$$

where $\lambda$ is any constant of $\delta_\mathcal{D}$ and $\delta_\mathcal{S}$ i.e. $\delta_\mathcal{D}\lambda = \delta_\mathcal{S} \lambda = 0$. These generators are linearly independent.

One does not need the explicit formulas of $\mathcal{D}$ in order to compute the infinitesimal generators of its symmetries.

==== Example ====
Consider Pierre François Verhulst's logistic growth model with linear predation, where the state variable $x$ represents a population. The parameter $a$ is the difference between the growth and predation rate and the parameter $b$ corresponds to the receptive capacity of the environment:

$$\dfrac{dx}{dt}= (a-bx)x, \dfrac{da}{dt}=\dfrac{db}{dt}=0.$$

The continuous dynamical system associated to this system of ODEs is:

$$\begin{array}{rccc}
\mathcal{D}: & (\mathbb{R},+) \times \mathbb{R}^4 & \rightarrow & \mathbb{R}^4 \\
& (\hat{t},(t,x,a,b)) & \rightarrow & \left(t+\hat{t}, \frac{axe^{a\hat{t}}}{a-(1-e^{a\hat{t}})bx}, a, b\right).
\end{array}$$

The independent variable $\hat{t}$ varies continuously; thus the associated group can be identified with $\mathbb{R}$.

The infinitesimal generator associated to this system of ODEs is:

$$\delta_\mathcal{D} = \dfrac{\partial}{\partial t} + ((a-bx)x)\dfrac{\partial}{\partial x}\cdot$$

The following infinitesimal generators belong to the 2-dimensional symmetry group of $\mathcal{D}$:

$$\delta_{\mathcal{S}_1} = -x \dfrac{\partial}{\partial x}+b\dfrac{\partial}{\partial b},
\quad
\delta_{\mathcal{S}_2} = t\dfrac{\partial}{\partial t}-x\dfrac{\partial}{\partial x}-a\dfrac{\partial}{\partial a}
\cdot$$

== Software ==
There exist many software packages in this area. For example, the package liesymm of Maple provides some Lie symmetry methods for PDEs. It manipulates integration of determining systems and also differential forms. Despite its success on small systems, its integration capabilities for solving determining systems automatically are limited by complexity issues. The DETools package uses the prolongation of vector fields for searching Lie symmetries of ODEs. Finding Lie symmetries for ODEs, in the general case, may be as complicated as solving the original system.
