= Schellenberger =

Schellenberger is a surname of German origin. Notable people with the surname include:

- Bernardin Schellenberger (born 1944), German theologian
- Dagmar Schellenberger (born 1958), German operatic soprano
- Gary Schellenberger (born 1943), Canadian politician
- Hansjörg Schellenberger (born 1948), German oboist and conductor
- Kenneth Schellenberger (born 1948), Canadian politician
- Raphaël Schellenberger (born 1990), French politician

== See also ==
- Shellenberger
- Schellenberg
- Shallenberger
