= Albert Cammermeyer =

Norwegian bookseller and publisher

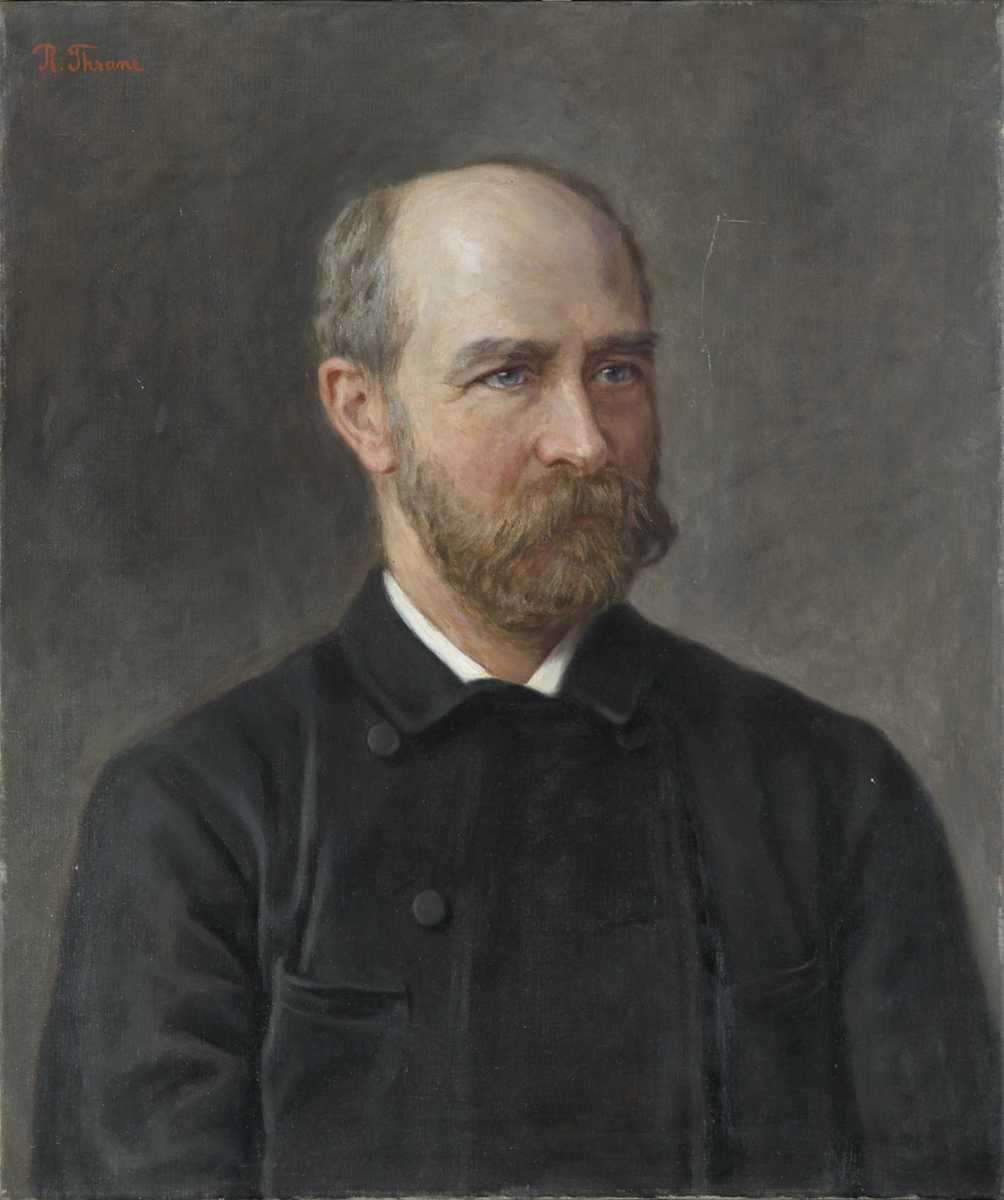
Fredrik Albert Cammermeyer Portrait by Ragnhild Thrane

Albert Cammermeyer (27 December 1838 – 18 February 1893) was a Norwegian bookseller and publisher. He was a pioneer in Norwegian publishing and founder of Alb. Cammermeyers bokhandel og forlag (now Cappelen Damm).

== Biography ==
Frederik Albert Cammermeyer was born in Innvik Municipality (now Stryn Municipality), in Sogn og Fjordane county, Norway. He started at the bookstore os Harald Lyche in Drammen (1854) and went to work for Jacob Dybwad in Christiania in 1862. He opened his own bookstore in 1867, later expanding into book publishing as well. In 1869, his enterprise became a supplier to the Parliamentary library. He chaired the Norwegian Booksellers Association from 1886 to 1891.

He succeeded Magnus Feilberg, who had been one of the founders of the Association in 1851. After he became ill, he handed over bookstores to three of his employees in 1888. The bookstore and publishing house were sold in separate transactions to three of Cammermeyer's associates between 1888 and 1890. The publishing house was taken over by Lars Swanström in 1890. In 1965, the bookstore Cammermeyer founded was merged into the Norwegian bookstore chain owned by Johan Grundt Tanum.

Today, the publishing enterprise founded by Albert Cammermeyer is a wholly owned subsidiary of the Norwegian publishing company Cappelen Damm, which was formed when the publishers JW Cappelen Publishing Co. and NW Damm & Søn AS in 2007.
