= Cocycle =

Closed cochain

In mathematics a cocycle is a closed cochain. Cocycles are used in algebraic topology to express obstructions (for example, to integrating a differential equation on a closed manifold). They are likewise used in group cohomology. In autonomous dynamical systems, cocycles are used to describe particular kinds of map, as in Oseledets theorem.

== Definition ==
=== Algebraic Topology ===
Let X be a CW complex and $C^n(X)$ be the singular cochains with coboundary map $d^n: C^{n-1}(X) \to C^n(X)$. Then elements of $\text{ker }d$ are cocycles. Elements of $\text{im } d$ are coboundaries. If $\varphi$ is a cocycle, then $d \circ \varphi = \varphi \circ \partial =0$, which means cocycles vanish on boundaries.

== See also ==
- Čech cohomology
- Cocycle condition
