= Lie coalgebra =

In mathematics a Lie coalgebra is the dual structure to a Lie algebra.

In finite dimensions, these are dual objects: the dual vector space to a Lie algebra naturally has the structure of a Lie coalgebra, and conversely.

== Definition ==
Let $E$ be a vector space over a field $\mathbb{k}$ equipped with a linear mapping $d\colon E \to E \wedge E$ from $E$ to the exterior product of $E$ with itself. It is possible to extend $d$ uniquely to a graded derivation (this means that, for any $a,b \in E$ which are homogeneous elements, $d(a \wedge b) = (da)\wedge b + (-1)^{\deg a} a \wedge(db)$) of degree 1 on the exterior algebra of $E$:

$$d\colon \bigwedge^\bullet E\rightarrow \bigwedge^{\bullet+1} E.$$

Then the pair $(E,d)$ is said to be a Lie coalgebra if $d^2=0$, i.e., if the graded components of the exterior algebra with derivation $(\bigwedge^* E, d)$ form a cochain complex:

$$E\ \xrightarrow{d}\ E\wedge E\ \xrightarrow{d}\ \bigwedge^3 E\xrightarrow{d}\ \cdots$$

=== Relation to de Rham complex ===
Just as the exterior algebra (and tensor algebra) of vector fields on a manifold form a Lie algebra (over the base field $\mathbb{k}$), the de Rham complex of differential forms on a manifold form a Lie coalgebra (over the base field $\mathbb{k}$). Further, there is a pairing between vector fields and differential forms.

However, the situation is subtler: the Lie bracket is not linear over the algebra of smooth functions $C^\infty(M)$ (the error is the Lie derivative), nor is the exterior derivative: $d(fg) = (df)g + f(dg) \neq f(dg)$ (it is a derivation, not linear over functions): they are not tensors. They are not linear over functions, but they behave in a consistent way, which is not captured simply by the notion of Lie algebra and Lie coalgebra.

Further, in the de Rham complex, the derivation is not only defined for $\Omega^1 \to \Omega^2$, but is also defined for $C^\infty(M) \to \Omega^1(M)$.

== The Lie algebra on the dual ==
A Lie algebra structure on a vector space is a map $[\cdot,\cdot]\colon \mathfrak{g}\times\mathfrak{g}\to\mathfrak{g}$ which is skew-symmetric, and satisfies the Jacobi identity. Equivalently, a map $[\cdot,\cdot]\colon \mathfrak{g} \wedge \mathfrak{g} \to \mathfrak{g}$ that satisfies the Jacobi identity.

Dually, a Lie coalgebra structure on a vector space E is a linear map $d\colon E \to E \otimes E$ which is antisymmetric (this means that it satisfies $\tau \circ d = -d$, where $\tau$ is the canonical flip $E \otimes E \to E \otimes E$) and satisfies the so-called cocycle condition (also known as the co-Leibniz rule)

$$\left(d\otimes \mathrm{id}\right)\circ d = \left(\mathrm{id}\otimes d\right)\circ d+\left(\mathrm{id} \otimes \tau\right)\circ\left(d\otimes \mathrm{id}\right)\circ d$$.

Due to the antisymmetry condition, the map $d\colon E \to E \otimes E$ can be also written as a map $d\colon E \to E \wedge E$.

The dual of the Lie bracket of a Lie algebra $\mathfrak g$ yields a map (the cocommutator)

$$[\cdot,\cdot]^*\colon \mathfrak{g}^* \to (\mathfrak{g} \wedge \mathfrak{g})^* \cong \mathfrak{g}^* \wedge \mathfrak{g}^*$$

where the isomorphism $\cong$ holds in finite dimension; dually for the dual of Lie comultiplication. In this context, the Jacobi identity corresponds to the cocycle condition.

More explicitly, let $E$ be a Lie coalgebra over a field of characteristic neither 2 nor 3. The dual space $E^*$ carries the structure of a bracket defined by

$\alpha([x, y]) = d\alpha(x \wedge y)$, for all $\alpha \in E$ and $x, y \in E^*$.

We show that this endows $E^*$ with a Lie bracket. It suffices to check the Jacobi identity. For any $x,y,z \in E^*$ and $\alpha \in E$,

$$\begin{align}
d^2\alpha (x\wedge y\wedge z) &= \frac{1}{3} d^2\alpha(x\wedge y\wedge z + y\wedge z\wedge x + z\wedge x\wedge y) \\
&=  \frac{1}{3} \left(d\alpha([x, y]\wedge z) + d\alpha([y, z]\wedge x) +d\alpha([z, x]\wedge y)\right),
\end{align}$$

where the latter step follows from the standard identification of the dual of a wedge product with the wedge product of the duals. Finally, this gives

$$d^2\alpha (x\wedge y\wedge z) = \frac{1}{3} \left(\alpha([[x, y], z]) + \alpha([[y, z], x])+\alpha([[z, x], y])\right).$$

Since $d^2=0$, it follows that

$\alpha([[x, y], z] + [[y, z], x] + [[z, x], y]) = 0$, for any $\alpha$, $x$, $y$, and $z$.

Thus, by the double-duality isomorphism (more precisely, by the double-duality monomorphism, since the vector space needs not be finite-dimensional), the Jacobi identity is satisfied.

In particular, note that this proof demonstrates that the cocycle condition $d^2=0$ is in a sense dual to the Jacobi identity.
