= Skavlan (surname) =

Skavlan is a surname. Notable people with the surname include:

- Aage Skavlan (1847–1920), Norwegian historian
- Einar Skavlan (1882–1954), Norwegian journalist, newspaper editor, theatre critic and theatre director
- Fredrik Skavlan (born 1966), Norwegian television host, journalist, and cartoonist
- Harald Skavlan (1854–1908), Norwegian railroad engineer
- Jenny Skavlan (born 1986), Norwegian model, actress, television presenter, and author
- Merete Skavlan (1920–2018), Norwegian actress, theatre instructor and director
- Olaf Skavlan (1838–1891), Norwegian literary historian and playwright
- Sigvald Skavlan (1839–1912), Norwegian priest, psalmist and educator
