= Solnør =

Historic farm in Møre og Romsdal, Norway

Coordinates: 62°29′16″N 06°43′49″E

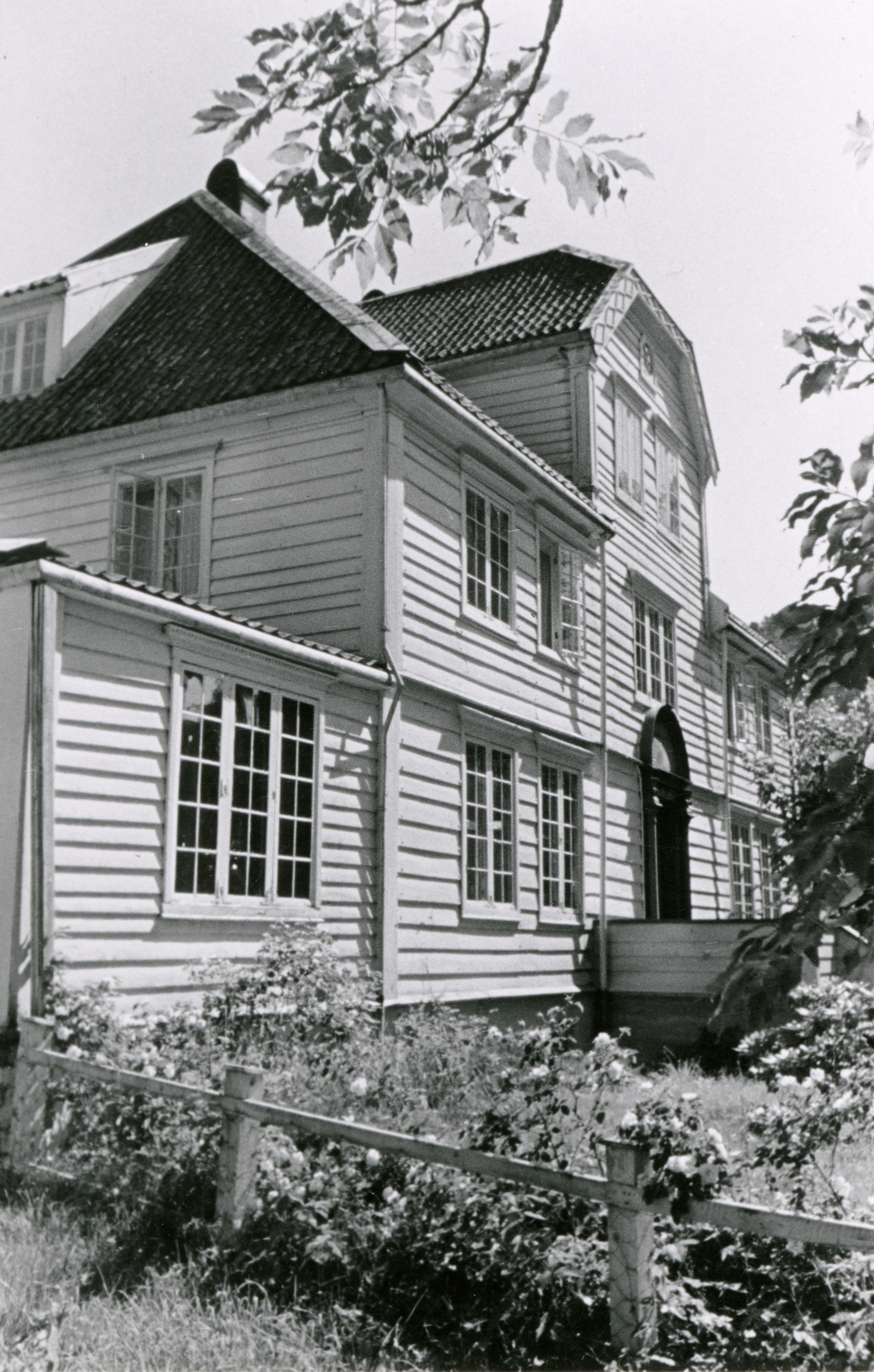
Farmhouse at Solnør.

Solnør is a Norwegian farm in Skodje Municipality in Møre og Romsdal county.

The farm has been known since the Middle Ages because it was a subordinate estate, known as Giskegods. The farmhouse was built by the officer Ludvig Daae (1792–1879) in 1825 and it received protected status in 1939. The house has a double-room layout with a central corridor, and the exterior has a classical symmetrical style with a large dormer and the main entrance in the middle of the facade. The door frame has a classical style with an arch over the top and columns.

The farm was purchased by Ludvig Daae in 1820, and it was taken over by his son, the politician Ludvig Daae; the two men were the uncle and cousin of Suzannah Ibsen. During his travels in Western Norway in the summer of 1862, Henrik Ibsen visited his wife's relatives at Solnør. The farm may have served as an inspiration for his play Rosmersholm (it may also have been inspired by the Molde farm in Molde Municipality and the parsonage farm in Herøy Municipality, where Suzannah grew up). Ibsen arrived at Solnør on July 16, 1862 and also became acquainted with the local historian Peder Fylling there. Ibsen copied or received a collection of local oral traditions from Fylling.

Magdalene Thoresen, Ibsens mother-in-law, was also at Solnør and met Peder Fylling. Thoresen used the lore that Fylling provided her with in her volume Billeder fra Vestkysten af Norge (Pictures from the West Coast of Norway, 1872).

Ludvig Daae hired the young Ivar Aasen as a private teacher for his children. It was during his time at Solnør that Ivar Aasen formulated his Nynorsk program in the essay "Om vort Skriftsprog" (Our Written Language). Aasen had previously taught at the home of Hans Conrad Thoresen, Ludvig Daee's brother-in-law and Ibsen's father-in-law. Aasen spent seven years at Solnør, and during that time he began studying the Sunnmøre dialect and also studied the plant life in the area.
