= Peder Fylling =

Peder Carolus Jonsen Fylling, also known as Per Fylling (September 26, 1818 – November 3, 1890), was a Norwegian folk material collector, book and antique collector, local historian, and author of cultural history books and articles.

Fylling was born at the Fylling farm in the parish of Skodje in Norway's Sunnmøre region, the son of John Fylling and Ragnhild Sorte. His father was interested in history and he passed along both his knowledge and this interest to his son. Fylling read books that he borrowed from the priests in the district and from the Daae family at the Solnør farm. Because of sickness, Fylling gave up his right to the farm in Skodje and dedicated himself to historical studies instead. He tirelessly traveled around the district, looking for old items, antiquities, folk poetry, old documents, and letters. Fylling sent his own manuscripts to the museum in Bergen, where he also sent old items and ancient artifacts that he found in the district.

In mid-June 1862, Henrik Ibsen arrived in Sunnmøre with a grant from the Collegium Academicum, the governing body at Royal Frederick University, to collect legends and folk tales. He stayed with Ludvig Daae at the Solnør farm, and it was probably Daae that who put Ibsen in touch with Peder Fylling. Ibsen's travel journal ends with his arrival at Sjøholt on July 17, 1862, after which he wrote the heading "Stories told by Peder Fylling" (Sagn fortalte af Peder Fylling). The material leaves no doubt that Ibsen obtained what he was looking for from Fylling. Fylling spent three days talking to Ibsen, who wrote down a series of legends and a few folk tales.

Ibsen published four of the legends in the magazine Illustreret Nyhedsblad in the fall of 1862. Magdalene Thoresen, Ibsen's mother-in-law, had also met Peder Fylling. Thoresen used the stories that she heard from Fylling in her volume Billeder fra Vestkysten af Norge (Pictures from the West Coast of Norway, 1872). The folk material collector Thrond Sjursen Haukenæs also visited Fylling at his home in Skodje. Haukenæs wrote the following about Fylling's work: "May many more appreciate Peder Fylling's activities, and may this often be carried out by men from the peasantry who ought to possess his investigative spirit for the benefit of the country and its people."

Fylling himself published the volume Folkesagn samlede paa Søndmør 1ste Del (Folk Material Gathered in Sunnmøre, Part 1) in 1874. The second part was published in 1877, and the last part in 1942, 52 years after his death. Fylling mostly wrote in a rigid Riksmål form that was far from his own dialect, and only once did he write in his local dialect. He also did not have much contact with the work of his contemporary Ivar Aasen, who lived with the Daae family at Solnør for seven years.

Fylling died at the Fylling farm.

== Bibliography ==
- Historisk-antikvariske Bemærkninger over Borgunds Præstegjeld paa Søndmøre (Historical and Antiquarian Observations on the Parish of Borgund in Sunnmøre). In Urda, vol. 3, 1847.
- Historisk-antikvariske Bemærkninger over Borgunds Præstegjeld paa Søndmøre, samt Gidskeætten (Historical and Antiquarian Observations on the Parish of Borgund in Sunnmøre, as well as the Giske Clan; Aalesund: T. Zernichows Bogtrykkeri, 1859)
- Folkesagn samlede paa Søndmøre (Folk Material Gathered in Sunnmøre). Part 1. (Aalesund, 1874)
- Historiske Optegnelser (Historical Records; Aalesund, 1875)
- Bidrag til en Søndmørsk Personalhistorie (A Personal History in Sunnmøre; Aalesund, 1875)
- Bidrag til Borgunds ældre Historie (Older History of Borgund; Aalesund, 1875)
- Bidrag til Veø ældre Historie (Older History of Veøy; Aalesund, 1875)
- Folkesagn samlede paa Søndmøre (Folk Material Gathered in Sunnmøre). Part 2. (Aalesund, 1877)
- Bidrag til en Søndmørsk Personalhistorie. (A Personal History in Sunnmøre; Aalesund, 1879)
- Afhandling om Giskeætten og Oldtidsminderne paa Giske. (The Giske Clan and Ancient Memories of Giske; Aalesund, 1883)
- Afhandling om Blindhiemsmændene og om Oldtidsminderne paa Blindhiem paa Vigerøen, sammen med Afhandling om Haramsøen (The Men of Blindheim and Ancient Memories of Blindheim on Vigra, together with Haramsøya). (Aalesund, 1884)
- Folkesagn (Folktales), with Knut Liestøl. (= Norsk Folkeminnelags skrifter 49). (Oslo, 1942)
- Folkesagn og Historiske Optegnelser (Folk Tales and Historical Records), a selection with Odd Vollan and Ivar Grøvik. (Ålesund: Sunnmøre Historielag, 1972)
- Historisk-antikvariske Bemærkninger over Borgunds Præstegjeld paa Søndmøre, samt Gidskeætten (Historical and Antiquarian Notes on the Parish of Borgund in Sunnmøre, as well as the Giske Clan; Oslo: Børsums Forlag & Antikvariat. 1963)
