= Elling Holst =

Norwegian mathematician, biographer and children's writer

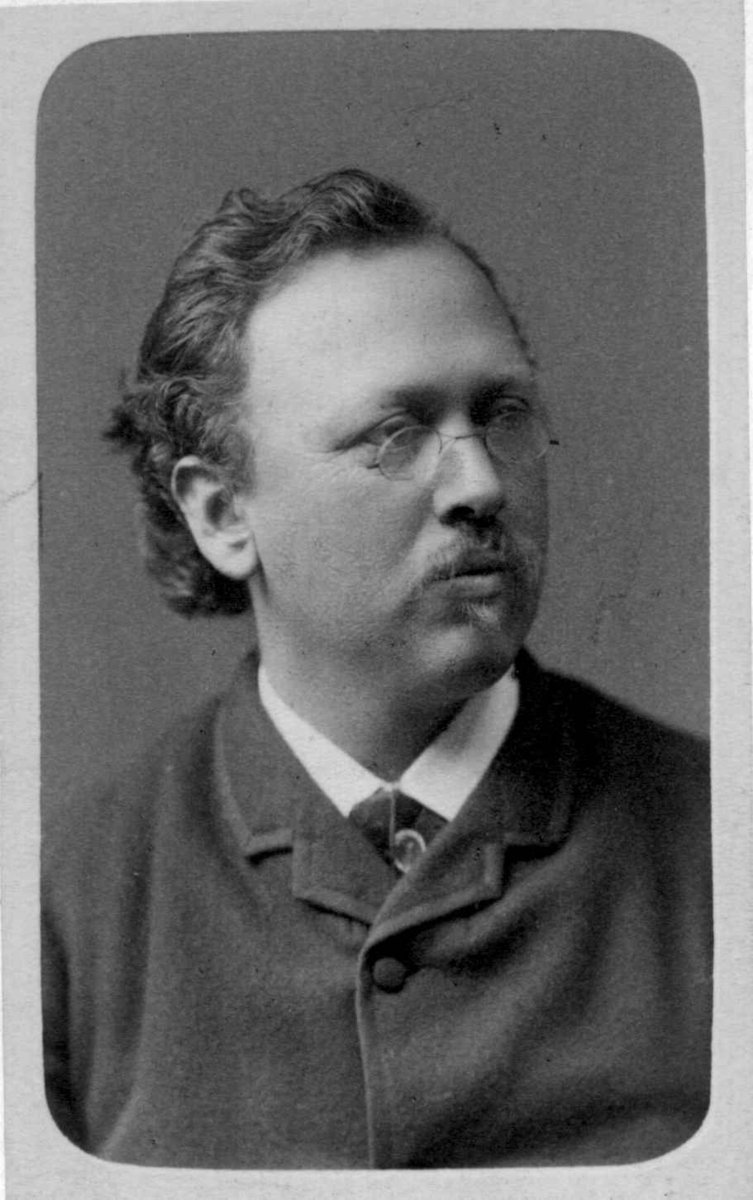
- Born: Elling Bolt Holst; 19 July 1849; Drammen, Norway
- Died: 2 September 1915 (aged 66); Bærum, Norway
- Education: University of Oslo
- Scientific career
- Fields: Mathematics
- Workplaces: University of Oslo
- Thesis: Et par syntetiske Metoder, især til Brug ved Studiet af metriske Egenskaber (1882)
- Doctoral advisor: Sophus Lie
- Doctoral students: Axel Thue

Elling Bolt Holst (19 July 1849 – 2 September 1915) was a Norwegian mathematician, biographer and children's writer.

== Early and personal life ==
Holst was born in Drammen, Norway. He was a son of bookseller Adolph Theodor Holst and Amalie Fredrikke Bergh. He was a grandson of merchant and politician, member of the Storting, Elling Mathias Holst (1785–1852).

Holst enrolled as a student at the University of Christiania (now University of Oslo), his doctoral advisor was Sophus Lie, and he graduated as cand.real. in 1874. He continued his studies in Germany, where Felix Klein was among his teachers. He was appointed teacher at Aars og Voss skole in Christiania (now Oslo). His thesis Et par syntetiske Methoder, især til Brug ved Studiet af metriske Egenskaber was finished in 1882.

== Career ==
Holst lectured in mathematics at the University of Oslo from 1894. Among his other mathematical works are his contribution from 1878, Om Poncelets betydning for geometrien, and several course books. He wrote biographies of several mathematicians, including Cato Maximilian Guldberg, Carl Anton Bjerknes, Sophus Lie and Niels Henrik Abel.

Norsk Billedbog for Børn

Holst is particularly known for his children's books Norsk Billedbog for Børn, three collections from 1888, 1890 and 1903 (with illustrations by Eivind Nielsen). The first of these books has been called Norway's first national picture book (although a picture abc had been published previously, in 1876). Holst started collecting traditional poems for children, several of which were first published in Norwegian writing in these books. These poems, such as "Ride, ride ranke", "Bake kake søte", "Kjerringa med staven", "Hoppe! sa gåsa" and "Du og jeg og vi to", have had a constant popularity over many years, and Norsk Billedbog for Børn has been reissued several times. Also contemporary poetry was included in the books, such as some poems by Henrik Wergeland, "Kom bukken til gutten" by Bjørnstjerne Bjørnson, and "Blaamand" by Aasmund Olavsson Vinje.

Among his other children's books are Julegodter for Børn from 1892, and A.B.C. for Skole og Hjem from 1893 (together with Anna Rogstad). He published the picture book Fra Sæteren in 1899, with illustrations by Lisbeth Bergh.

== Personal life ==
He was married twice, first to Inger Skavlan (1852–99), and was a brother-in-law of Olaf Skavlan, Sigvald Skavlan, Aage Skavlan and Harald Skavlan. After her death, he married Marie Michelet (1872–1960), sister of Simon Michelet, in 1900.

He was decorated Knight, First Class of the Order of St. Olav in 1902.
