= Nils Nordberg =

Norwegian writer (born 1942)

- Born: 26 March 1942 (age 84); Verdal Municipality, Norway
- Occupations: Crime fiction writer, anthology editor and audio play director

Nils Nordberg (born 26 March 1942, in Verdal Municipality) is a Norwegian crime writer, anthology editor and audio play director. He has worked for the Norwegian Broadcasting Corporation since 1969, and for Radioteatret since 1973. He is regarded among Norway's leading experts on crime fiction.

Cultural offices
| Preceded by Merete Skavlan | Director of Radioteatret; 1990–1991 | Succeeded by Nils Kristian Heyerdahl |
