= Aage Schavland =

Norwegian politician

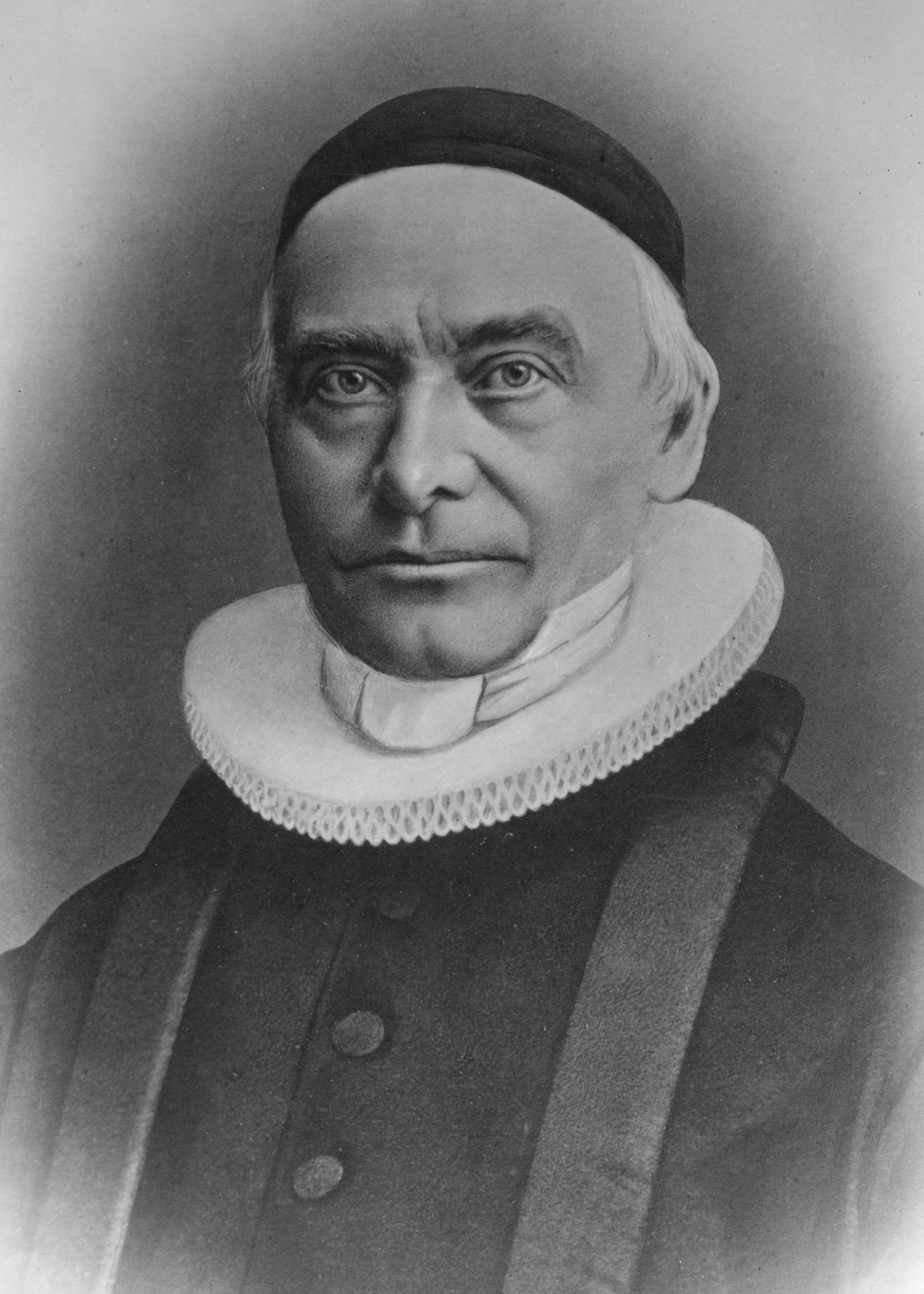
Aage Schavland

Aage Schavland (6 November 1806 – 20 March 1876) was a Norwegian priest and Member of Parliament.

Aage Schavland was born in what is now Strand Municipality in Rogaland county. He took his entrance examination in 1826 and was granted his Theology degree in 1829. In 1834, became vicar of the Stranda Church parish in Sunnmøre. From 1840 he was dean of the Nordre Sunnmøre prosti. From 1844 to 1861, he was vicar for the Herøy Church parish in Sunnmøre. From 1861 he was assistant pastor at Nidaros Cathedral in Trondheim.

Schavland was mayor of Herøy Municipality in Møre og Romsdal from 1846 to 1849 and again from 1854 to 1857. He was also mayor of Trondheim Municipality in 1865 and deputy mayor from 1867 to 1868. He was elected to the Storting for several periods. From 1848 to 1850, from 1851 to 1853, and from 1857 to 1858 he represented Romsdals Amt. From 1865 to 1867 and from 1868 to 1870 he represented Trondhjem og Levanger. Schavland served as mayor of Trondhjem in 1865.

Schavland was married to Gerhardine Pauline Bergh (1817–1884). They were the parents of eight children including Olaf Skavlan, Aage Skavlan, Sigvald Skavlan and Harald Skavlan, the in-laws of Ludvig Daae and grandparents of Einar Skavlan.

Political offices
Preceded by Fritz Lorck	Mayor of Trondheim; 1865	Succeeded by Ove Christian Roll
