= Ludvig Daae (politician) =

Norwegian jurist, landowner and politician

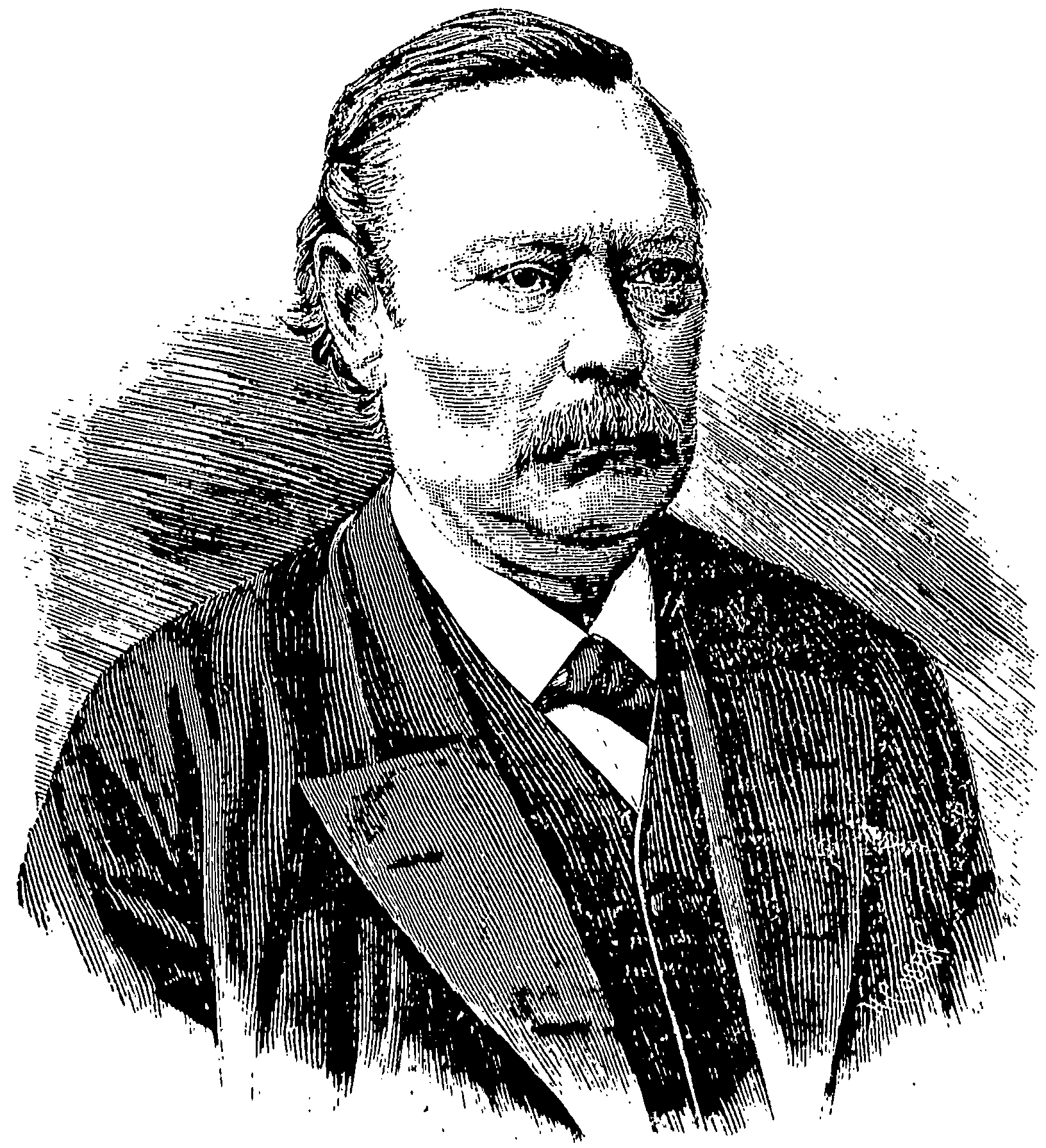
Ludvig Daae

Ludvig Daae (24 April 1829 – 1 May 1893) was a Norwegian jurist, landowner and politician for the Liberal Party. He was the Norwegian Minister of the Army from 1884 to 1885 on the cabinet of Prime Minister Johan Sverdrup.

== Background ==
Daae was born on the Solnør farm at Skodje in Romsdalen county, Norway. He was a son of captain Ludvig Daae (1792–1879) and Barbara Henrikke Wind (1800–1860), and grandson of the priest Johan Christopher Haar Daae. The Solnør estate had been purchased by his father in 1820. He was a brother of Henrik Wind Daae, and a second cousin of Ludvig Ludvigsen Daae and Iver Munthe Daae. In July 1858 he married Anna Christine Schavland (1836–1904), a daughter of dean and politician Aage Schavland. He was a brother-in-law of Olaf Skavlan, Sigvald Skavlan, Einar Skavlan, Sr., Aage Skavlan and Harald Skavlan.

== Career ==
He attended Heltberg Latin School (Heltbergs Studentfabrikk) in Christiania (now Oslo) graduating in 1846 and then studied law until 1850. In 1863, he took over operation the farm. At his father's death in 1879, he took over the rest of the family estate. He served as mayor of Skodje Municipality and conciliation commissioner. He was later founder of Skodje and Vatne Sparebank. In 1868, he was appointed sheriff in Sunnmøre and in 1876 he was the judge in Nordre Sunnmøre. He was elected to the Norwegian Parliament representing Romsdal from 1859 to 1860, 1862 to 1863, 1864, 1865-1866, 1868-1869 and 1871-1879. From 1886 to 1888 he was member of Parliament from Aalesund and Molde.

He died in 1893 at Kristiansand and was buried in Skodje.

== Selected works ==
His memoirs and diaries were later published as Politiske dagbøker og minner (5 volumes; 1934–1971).

Political offices
Preceded by Lars Christian Dahll	Norwegian Minister of the Army; 1884–1885	Succeeded by Johan Sverdrup
