= Stranda =

Stranda may also refer to:

== Places ==
- Stranda Municipality, a municipality in Møre og Romsdal county, Norway
- Stranda, Møre og Romsdal, a village within Stranda Municipality in Møre og Romsdal county, Norway
- Stranda Hundred, a hundred of Småland in Sweden
- Stranda Church, a church in Stranda Municipality in Møre og Romsdal county, Norway
- Stranda Church (Leksvik), a church in Indre Fosen Municipality in Trøndelag county, Norway

== Other ==
- Stranda IL, a sports club based in Stranda Municipality in Møre og Romsdal county, Norway
- Stranda Fjord Trail Race, a race based in Stranda Municipality in Møre og Romsdal county, Norway
