= Hans Conrad Thoresen =

Norwegian politician

Hans Conrad Thoresen (July 28, 1802 – June 11, 1858) was a Norwegian priest, a member of the Storting, and Henrik Ibsen's father-in-law.

Thoresen was born the son of a cooper in Tønsberg. He passed his theological exam in 1825 and served as a priest in Sunnmøre from 1826 to 1843. From 1828 onward he was also a provost in Herøy, where he was Ivar Aasen's first teacher. Among other things, Thoresen taught Aasen rhetoric using Jacob Rosted's work Forsøg til en Rethorik (Introduction to Rhetoric).

His first wife was Marie Dorothea Sophie Münster (1803–1827). Thoresen's second marriage was to Sara Margrethe Daae (April 6, 1806 – May 10, 1841), the daughter of the priest Johan Christopher Haar Daae. The two of them had five children, and their daughter Suzannah later married Henrik Ibsen. Sara Daae was also the aunt of the politician Ludvig Daae. Thoresen's third wife was the author Anna Magdalene Kragh (1819–1903). Magdalene accepted a position as a governess with Thoresen in 1842; in June 1843, she gave birth to a son, who was placed in foster care in Copenhagen, and she then married Thoresen in October 1843. According to Aagaat Daae, Magdalene Kragh came to Herøy in 1842. Magdalene became a stepmother to Thoresen's daughter Suzannah.

In July 1843 he was named parish priest at Holy Cross Church in Bergen and the family relocated to Bergen in 1844. (Note: According to Lampe (p. 218), the family moved in 1846.) From 1844 to 1861, the Thoreson house in Bergen served as a cultural center. In Bergen, people such as Bishop Jacob Neumann, the educators Lyder Sagen and Hans Holmboe, and Henrik Ibsen belonged to the Thoresens' circle of acquaintances. Henrik Ibsen was first invited to the Thoresen home early in 1856, and he married their daughter Suzannah two years later, only three days after her father's funeral.

Thoresen represented Romsdal county in the Storting from 1842 to 1844. According to Aagaat Daae, he represented Romsdal county in the Storting in 1848. He served on many settlement committees for Herøy.

Aage Schavland took over as parish priest in Herøy when Thoresen relocated to Bergen. Schavland's daughter Anne Kristine was married to Ludvig Daae, Suzannah Thoresen's cousin.

Thoresen died in Bergen while serving as the provost at Holy Cross Church.
