= Vossingen =

Vossingen may refer to:

- Vossingen, old name of the newspaper Søndre Bergenhus Amtstidende
- Vossingen, short-lived newspaper from 1900 to 1902
- Vossingen, old name of the newspaper Horda Tidend
