= Thrond Sjursen Haukenæs =

Norwegian folklore collector and author

Thrond Sjursen Haukenæs (March 4, 1840 – November 14, 1922) was a Norwegian folklore collector and an author, publisher, and distributor of his own works.

Haukenæs was born at the Haukanes farm on the Granvin Fjord between Granvin and Folkedal in Hordaland county. Haukenæs initially worked as a shepherd, and then spent several years fishing for herring and also traveling around as a book seller. He married Kristi Gjerdsdotter Aalvik (1849–1914) from Indre Ålvik in 1871 and then settled down as a trader in Granvin. He went into business with his friend Rikoll Eide. Haukenæs then became the manager of the Graven Consumer Association (Gravens Forbrugsforening), which developed to operate mail services, a coaching inn, and a hotel. The association experienced economic difficulties, and so Haukenæs took it over at book value and then continued it as a private operation.

== Folklore collector ==
After meeting Peter Christen Asbjørnsen during a collection expedition in Hardanger in the summer of 1870, Haukenæs also started gathering folk material in the district. In 1882 he published a request in several newspapers in Western Norway for people in Hardanger, Voss, and neighboring villages to send him manuscript collections with oral traditions.

In 1883, Haukenæs's business went bankrupt, and at the same time he lost his entire private library. This combination of material distress and poor prospects led Haukenæs to embark on a new endeavor that attracted him; namely to cultivate his new hobby of collecting and publishing folk material. Haukenæs was extremely productive, but did not trust his own writing skills, and so he sought help from the more experienced writer Jon Nilsson Skaar from Botnen at the head of Fykse Sound. He paid Skaar to help him write out and arrange the available material.

In 1890, Haukenæs visited the well-known folklore collector Peder Fylling at his home in Skodje Municipality. A travelogue from his trip was published in the newspaper Sunnmørsposten.

== Author and publisher ==
In a series of books, Haukenæs presented information about nature, folk life, and folk belief in Hardanger, Sunnhordland, and Voss. He also wrote an autobiography. The print runs were quite small; this, combined with some mishaps—such as some boxes of books that burned during a fire in Granvin in 1885 and a large shipment of books that went down with the steamer Ole Bull when the ship was wrecked outside Volda in 1888—has resulted in many of Haukenæs's titles being very rare and hard to obtain.

Haukenæs was successful as an author, and on May 17, 1899 he and his family were able to move into his attractive new home at the Solbakken farm at Eide in Granvin, named after Bjørnstjerne Bjørnson's 1857 peasant novel Synnøve Solbakken. By the time he turned 60 the next year, Haukenæs had been able to write no fewer than 30 books in 16 years.

== Bibliography ==
- "Om en Jernbane fra Voss til Ejde i Graven" (A Railway from Voss to Eide in Granvin, in Vossingen, 1872)
- "Telegraf fra Voss til Ejde i Graven" (A Telegraph from Voss to Eide in Granvin, in Vossingen, 1873)
- "Merkelige Kirker i Begen under Katolicismen" (Notable Churches in Bergen under Catholicism, in Hardangeren, 1875)
- "Ein Tur til Vøringsfossen" (A Tour to Vøring Falls, in Søndre Bergenhus Folkeblad, 1878)
- "Historiske Notiser og Bygdefortællinger fra Graven" (Historical Notes and Village Tales from Granvin, in Søndre Bergenhus Folkeblad, 1879)
- Natur, Folkeliv og Folketro i Hardanger, Voss og Søndhordland (Nature, Folk Life, and Folk Belief in Hardanger, Voss, and South Hordaland), I: Eidsfjord (Eidfjord Municipality; Bergen, 1884); II: Graven (Granvin; Bergen, 1885); III: Ulvik (Bergen, 1885); IV: Voss (Bergen, 1887); V: Vikør (Bergen, 1888); VI: Kvindeherred (Kvinnherad Municipality; Bergen 188?); VII: Ullensvang (Bergen, 1891); VIII: Strandebarm (Bergen 1894); IX: Hålandsdalen (Bergen 189?); X: Røldal (Bergen, 1891); XI: Gammelt og nyt fra Voss og Vossestranden (Old and New From Voss and Vossestrand; Bergen, 1896)
- Livsskildring eller fødebygd, slegt og selvbiografi. (Med forfatterens portræt) (A Life Portrayal or the Birthplace, Family, and Autobiography. With the Author's Portrait; Granvin, 1889)
- Reiseskildringer fra Norges natur og folkeliv (Travelogues from Norway's Nature and Folk Life), I: Sogn og Fjordane, Møre og Romsdal og Trøndelag (Granvin, 1890); II: Telemark (Granvin, 1892); III: Austlandet (Eastern Norway; Granvin, 1892); IV: Vestlandet (Western Norway; Granvin, 1893); V: Trøndelagen og Østlandet (Trøndelag and Eastern Norway; Granvin, 1893)
- Ullensvang-boka (A Book about Ullensvang; Granvin, 1891)
- Strandebarm, Hålandsdalen og Røldal (Strandebarm, Hålandsdal, and Røldal; Granvin, 1894)
- Lys og mørke.Skildringer fra det norske folkeliv (Light and Darkness: Descriptions of Norwegian Folk Life; Bergen, 1898)
- Midnatsolens rige. Skildringer af naturen, folkelivet og historien i Nordlands, Tromsøs og Finmarkens amter (The Kingdom of the Midnight Sun: Descriptions of Nature, Folk Life, and History in Nordland, Tromsø, and Finnmark Counties; Bergen, 1899)
- Norsk Eventyrskat (Treasury of Norwegian Adventures), Part 2 (Granvin, 1903)
- Granvins Saga (Granvin's Saga; Granvin, 1904)
- Reiseminder fra bygd og by (Travel Memories from Village and Town; Granvin, 1905)
- Bondeliv og bondeslegter fra ældre og nyere tider. I: Haukenæsslegtens saga (Peasant Life and Peasant Families from Old and New Times. I: The Story of the Haukenæs Family; Granvin, 1908)
- Granvins Saga II. Granvins Saga III. Av mit Liv og min Tid (Granvin's Saga II. Granvin's Saga III. From My Life and My Time; Bergen, 1915)
