= Nils Kristian Heyerdahl =

Norwegian historian

Nils Kristian Heyerdahl (born 11 April 1941) is a Norwegian historian of ideas, theatre director and non-fiction writer. He was theatre director of Radioteatret in the Norwegian Broadcasting Corporation from 1991 to 2011, and is President of the Norwegian Academy from 2011.

Cultural offices
Preceded by Merete Skavlan	Director of Radioteatret; 1991–2011	Succeeded by Yngvil Kiran
