= Eivind Nielsen =

Norwegian illustrator and painter (1864–1939)

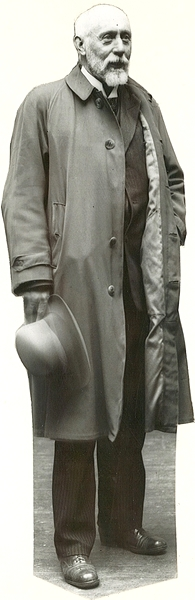
Eivind Nielsen, c.1930

Eivind Nielsen (18 June 1864 – 13 July 1939) was a Norwegian painter, illustrator and teacher.

He was born at Haugesund in Rogaland, Norway. He was the son of byfogd (bailiff) Martin Nielsen (1823–1899) and Caroline Emilie Petersen (1830–1898). Nielsen was a student of Hans Heyerdahl and started at the Knud Bergslien art school in Christiania (now Oslo) in 1880. He studied in Munich until 1883. From 1885 to 1888, he was a student at the Norwegian National Academy of Craft and Art Industry.

His breakthrough as illustrator was the children's book Norsk Billedbog for Børn (Kristiania : L.E. Tvedtes Forlag) by Elling Holst from 1888, which is regarded as the first colored picture book in Norway. The book became widely popular and has been reprinted numerous times (the 17th edition was issued in 1998). He also illustrated the sequels from 1890 and 1903. The main subjects were depicted naturalistically but kept separate by an ornamental framework, usually in the form of tree roots or other organic shapes. In total he illustrated 38 books.

He is also known for his ceiling decorations in the National Theatre. He was a teacher at the Norwegian National Academy of Craft and Art Industry from 1890 to 1934. In 1899, he received a state scholarship and went on study tours to Rome and Paris. He received the King's Medal of Merit in gold upon his retirement in 1934.

== Gallery ==
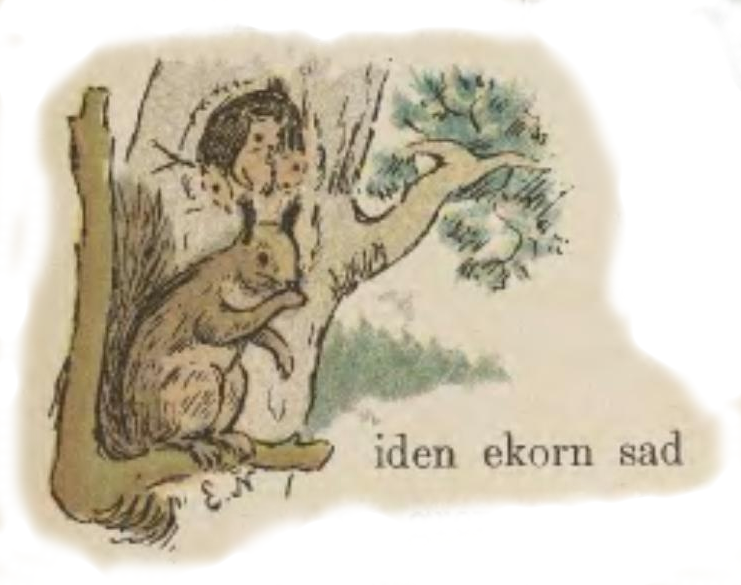
Little squirrel sitting (Norsk Billedbog for børn)

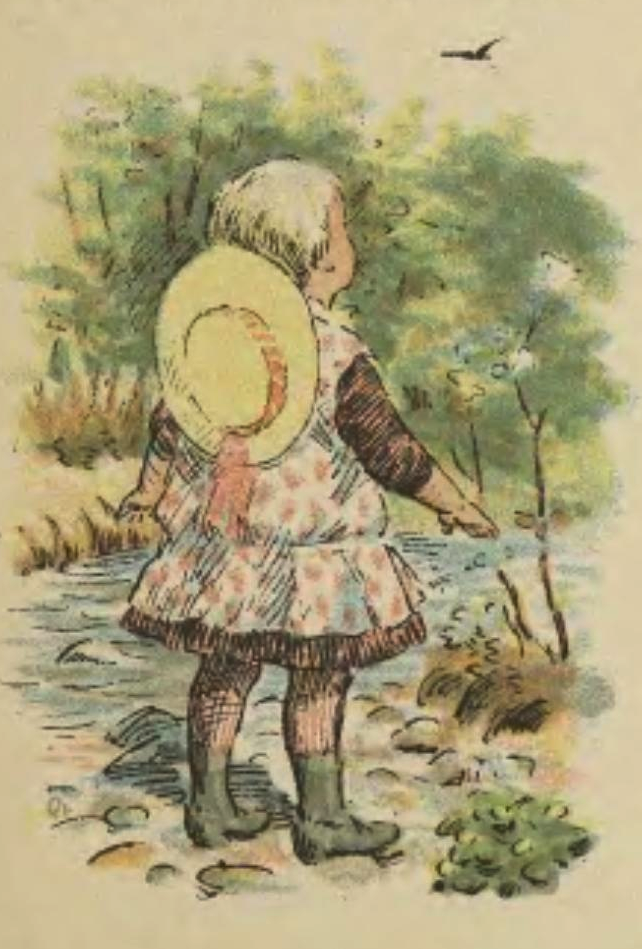
Bold did the bird fly
(Norsk Billedbog for børn)

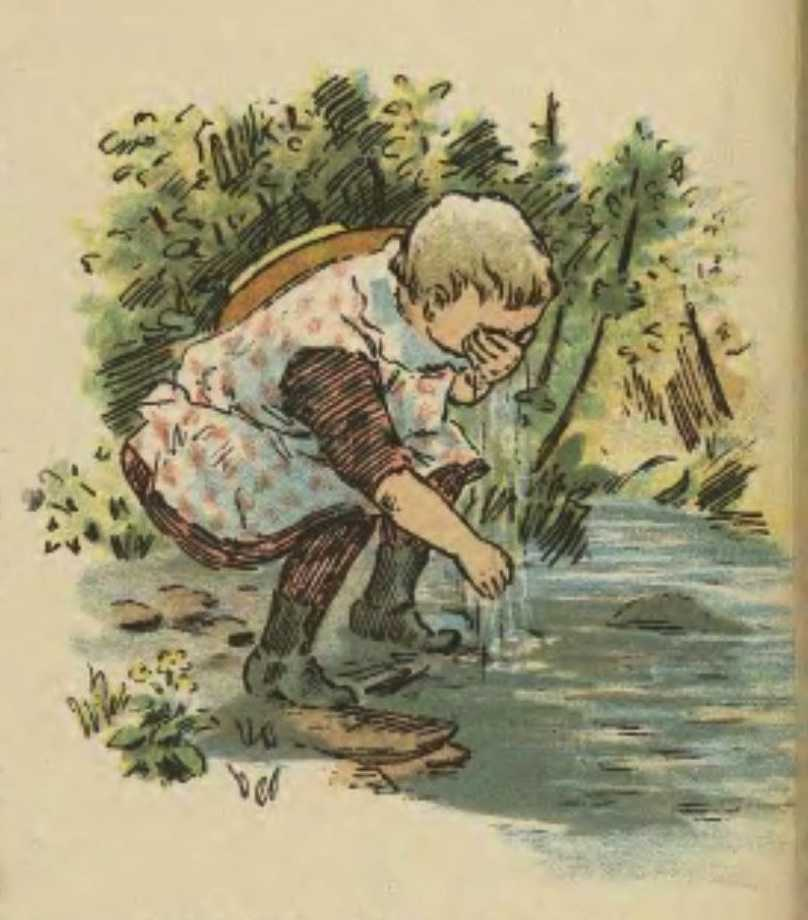
Dipping her hand down (Norsk Billedbog for børn)

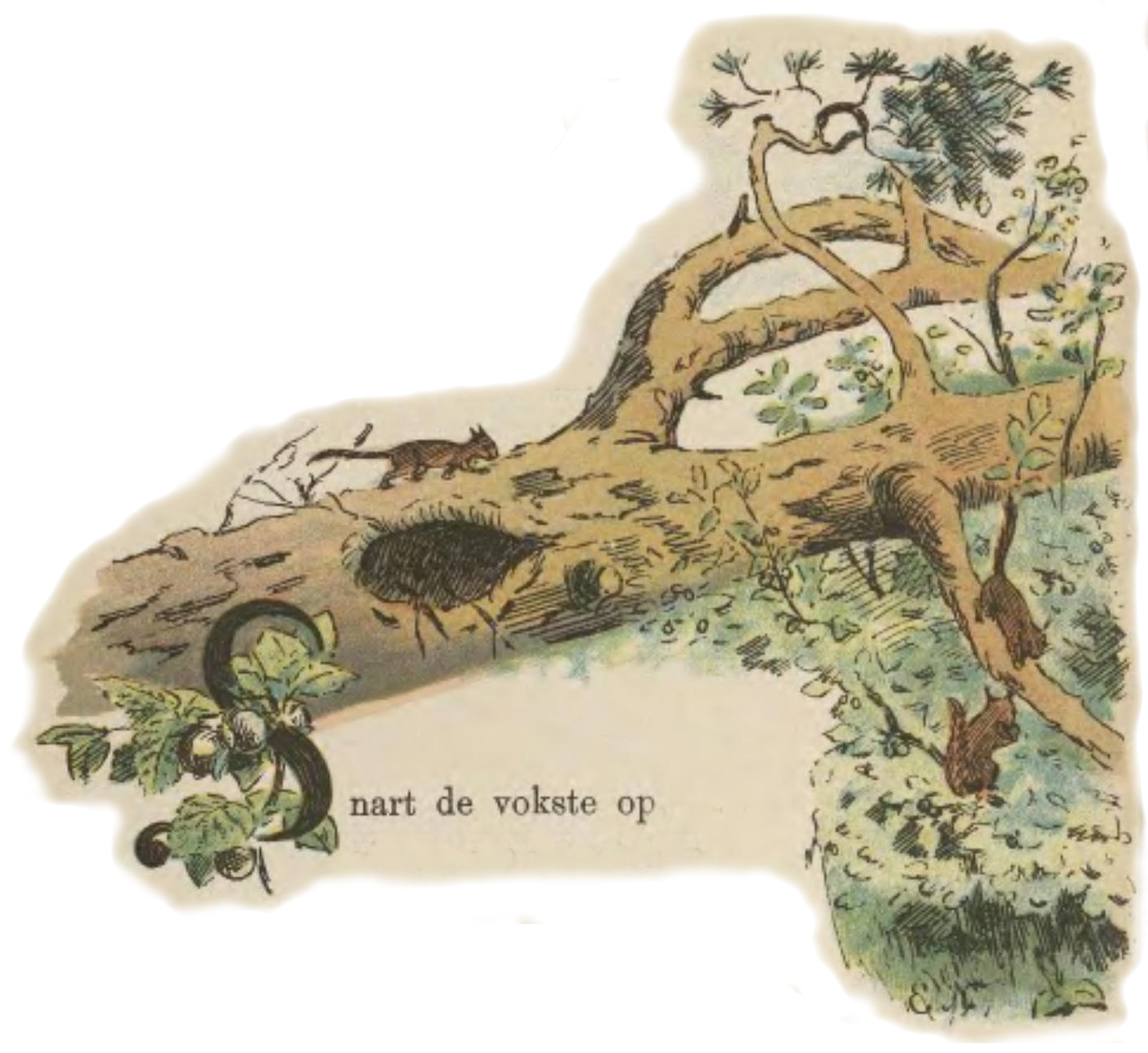
Squirrel in tree (Norsk Billedbog for børn)

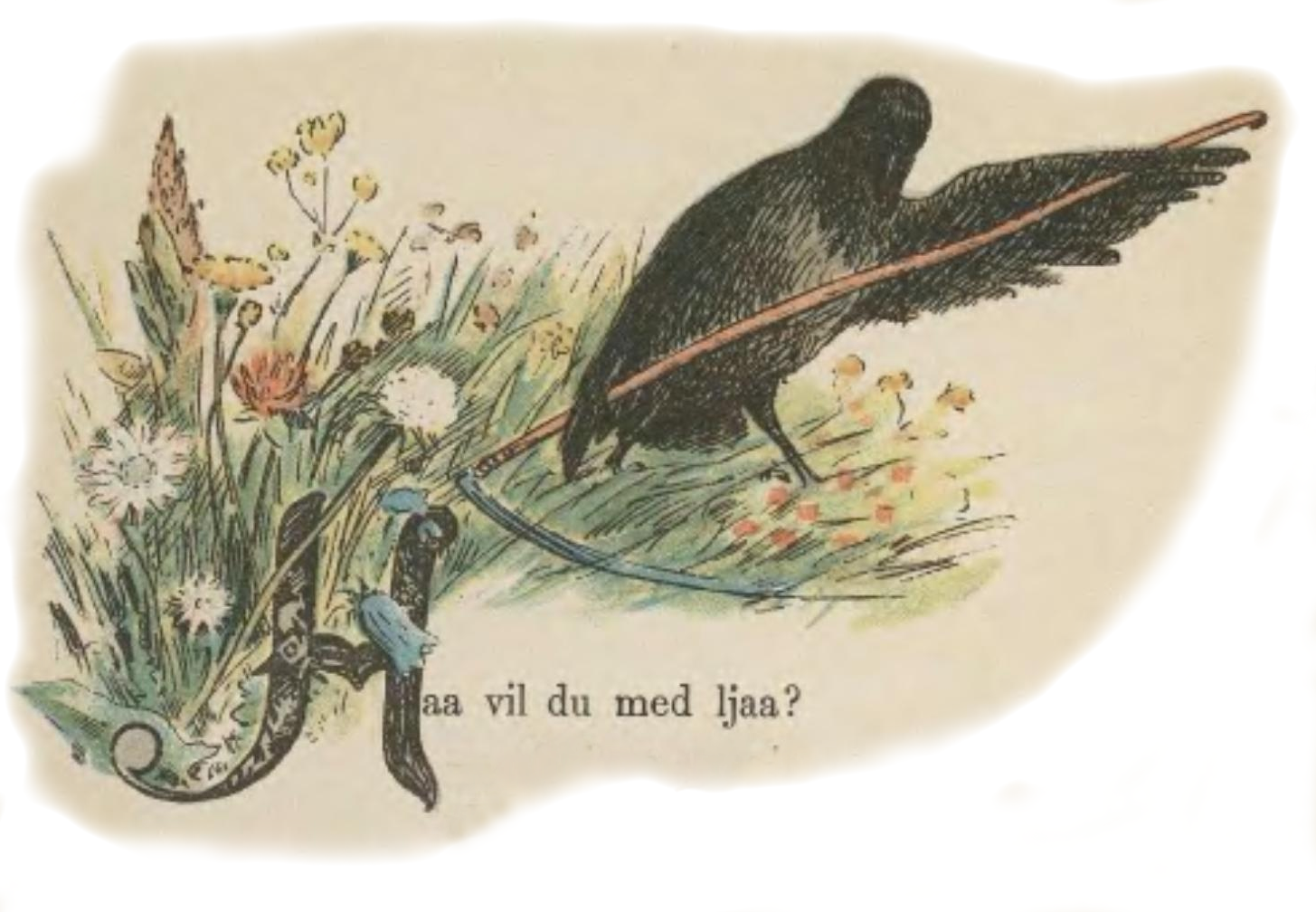
What do you want with a scythe
(Norsk Billedbog for børn)

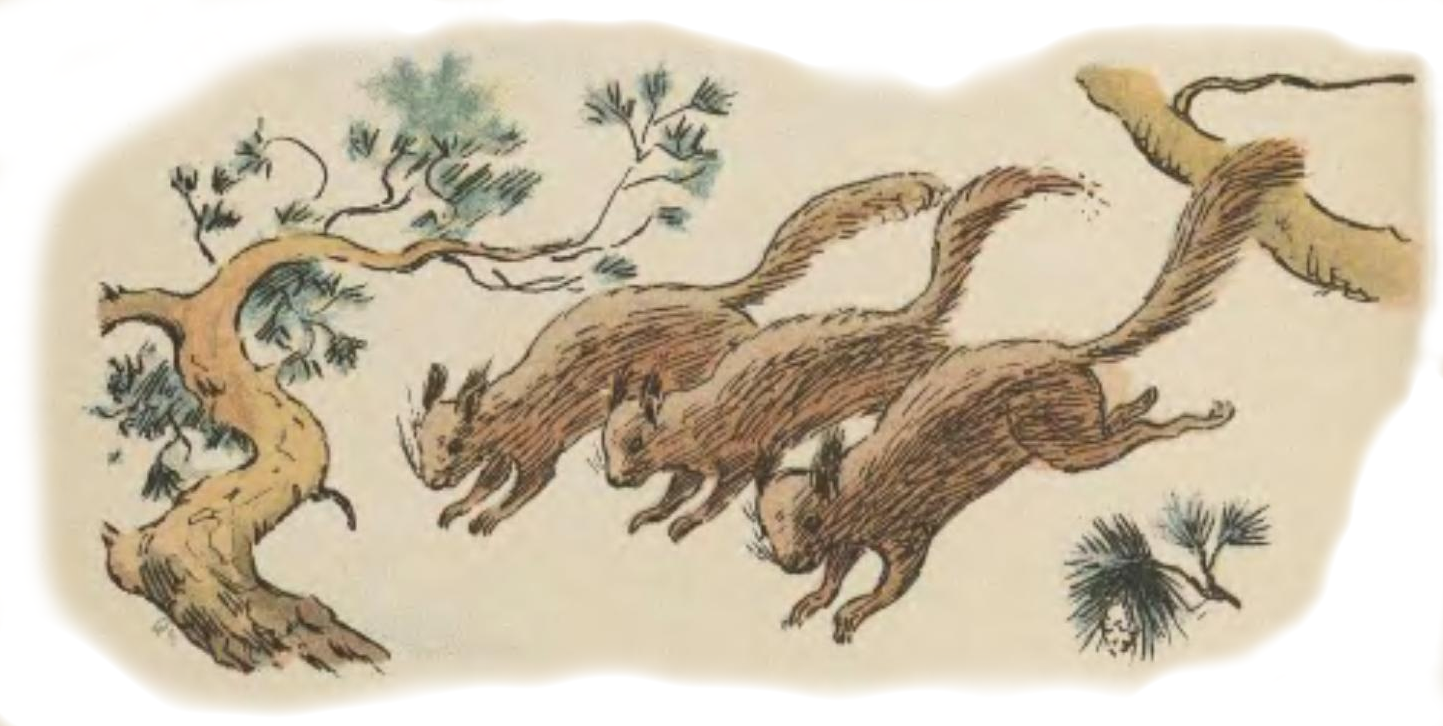
All three leaping
(Norsk Billedbog for børn)
