= Radioteatret =

Department of the Norwegian Broadcasting Corporation

Coordinates: 59°56′07″N 10°43′07″E

Radioteatret is a department of the Norwegian Broadcasting Corporation which produces audio plays for radio broadcasting. It was established in 1927.

In January 2021, Verdens Gang cited a report from NTB, saying that Radioteatret [now is] being decommissioned; furthermore "the theatre will get a new life as [a] podcast".

== Directors ==
Its first theatre director was Gunnar Neels-Hansson, who headed the theatre until 1950. Later directors have been Jens Gunderssen from 1950 to 1952, Hans Heiberg from 1952 to 1973, and Gerhard Knoop from 1973 to 1984. Merete Skavlan headed the theatre from 1984 to 1991, and Nils Kristian Heyerdahl from 1991.

== Early history ==
The private company Kringkastingsselskapet started broadcasting in Norway in 1925. When the state-owned Norwegian Broadcasting Corporation (NRK) was formed in 1933, most of the administration was transferred to NRK, including the music and theatre departments.

In 1925 and 1926, broadcast drama consisted mostly of pure reciting from the drama literature. The first proper audio play was a translation of the classic play Light and Shade by L. du Garde Peach, which was sent in March 1926. The first Norwegian proper audio play was Per Jespersen's sketch Hvem har telefonert? from March 1927, while the second was Luftreisen by Peter Lykke-Seest. In addition to specially written audio plays, also ordinary plays were adapted for radio. In 1927 reciter Gunnar Neels-Hansson was appointed as leader of the drama production, the first theatre director. Among the productions from 1927 were Ervingen by Ivar Aasen, Jeppe by Ludvig Holberg and Strindberg's Dødsdansen. The first productions were sent live. One of the challenges was the logistics when many actors had to share the same microphone. Another challenge was the sound effects, which were often improvised by the technicians. From 1934 special instruments were made for sound effects. The number of productions were about 20 per year in the late 1920s.
