= Horda Tidend =

Norwegian newspaper from Voss, Hordaland

Horda Tidend was a Norwegian newspaper, published in Voss Municipality in Hordaland county.

Vossingen (not to be confused with earlier newspapers by that name) was started on 1 September 1925. In April 1929 it changed its name to Horda Tidend and became the official organ of the Agrarian Party for Voss and Hardanger.

It survived competition from the Bergen-based organ Bondebladet, but later struggled. During the occupation of Norway by Nazi Germany it was stopped from August 1941, and did not return until April 1949, long after the end of war and occupation. Johs K. Ringheim was editor-in-chief from 1949 to 1981, but the newspaper then had five editors over the next eight years. The second-largest newspaper in Voss behind Hordaland, it tried to survive by becoming politically independent and leaving the broadsheet format. This did help to a degree, with the newspaper's circulation peaking with 2,413 copies in 1987, but Horda Tidend became defunct after its last issue on 6 January 1989.
