= Gerhard Knoop =

Norwegian actor, stage producer and theatre director

- Born: Gerhard Herman Knoop; 3 November 1920; Kristiania, Norway
- Died: 25 October 2009 (aged 88); Oslo, Norway
- Occupation(s): Actor, stage producer, theatre director

Gerhard Herman Knoop (3 November 1920 – 25 October 2009) was a Norwegian actor, stage producer, theatre director and film director. He is mostly known for directing the movies Minne om to mandager (1964), Dei rid mot havet (1960) and Avskjedsgaven (1961).

== Early and personal life ==
Knoop was born in Kristiania (present-day Oslo), the son of Herman Waldemar Knoop (1887–1961) and Ellen Caroline Sontum (1897–1962). He made his stage debut in a school revue while studying at the gymnasium. He took his examen artium (university entrance exam) in 1939. During World War II he was involved in resistance work, and had to flee to Sweden in 1942, where he joined the police troops. After the war, he studied at the University of Oslo and at the University of Denver. He married Eva Cecilie Julsrud in September 1948 in Denver.

== Theatre career ==
Knoop was employed at Rogaland Teater from 1949, first as actor and later as stage producer. Among his productions were adaptions of Arnold and Bach's farce Die spanische Fliege, and of Ibsen's play A Doll's House, and of Willner and Reichert's operetta Das Dreimäderlhaus. He worked as a free-lance producer from 1952, for Riksteatret, the National Theatre, Det Norske Teatret, Det Nye Teater, Fjernsynsteatret and Radioteatret. Among his productions were adaptions of Beckett's play Waiting for Godot, Chekhov's comedy Uncle Vanya and Ibsen's play Rosmersholm. He produced Ibsen's play Hedda Gabler for the Pitlochry Festival Theatre in Scotland in 1963. He has also produced Ibsen's plays Ghosts and The Wild Duck, Strindberg's Easter and Miss Julie, and Ionesco's The Chairs.

He headed the Norwegian National Academy of Theatre from 1964 to 1970. From 1973 to 1984 he was employed at the Norwegian Broadcasting Corporation as head of Radioteatret. He started the independent theatre group Intimteatret in 1991, together with Merete Skavlan. He died in Oslo on 25 October 2009.

Cultural offices
Preceded by Hans Heiberg	Director of Radioteatret; 1973–1984	Succeeded by Merete Skavlan
