= Språkåret 2013 =

2013 festival in Norway

Språkåret (The Language Year) in Norway was arranged with government support in 2013. That year was 200 years after Ivar Aasen was born. It was 100 years after Det Norske Teatret (The Norwegian Theatre) opened. Ivar Aasen's life work was the development of Nynorsk (New Norse), a language with grammar and vocabulary based upon the way ordinary Norwegians, primarily rural, spoke. After a few hundred years under Danish rule, many in the cities as well as everyone educated in Denmark, spoke and wrote Danish and Danish was taught in schools. Det Norske Teatret is a theatre in Oslo that primarily produces plays in Nynorsk.

These two jubilees were the main reasons for the decision to create a national year of celebration of languages. Språkåret 2013 was a stand-alone project, organised within the Nynorsk kultursentrum (Nynorsk culture center) and funded by the Norwegian Ministry of Culture.

== Valuable cultural expressions ==
The purpose of Språkåret 2013 was to embrace and celebrate the diversity of language that exists in Norway. One sought to put focus on the positive effects that arise out of living in a country with several languages. The two official written versions of Norwegian, Bokmål and Nynorsk, the language of the indigenous people in the north, Sámi, and the three recognised national minority languages; Kvensk, Romani, Romanes as well as Norwegian sign language, another official language. In addition there is huge variation in local dialects as well as the many languages spoken by immigrants. The year of 2013 was dedicated to celebrating, discussing, and trying to raise awareness of the valuable cultural expressions and identities that are connected to languages and dialects.

== Objectives for the year ==
- To create stronger linguistic self-esteem amongst people who have Nynorsk as their preferred language and moreover to heighten public acceptance of the country's language-divided culture.
- To increase pride in the linguistic culture of Nynorsk, also among the people who have Bokmål as their preferred language.
- To increase knowledge of and respect for the native language Sámi, minority languages, immigrant- languages and sign language.
- To put the language situation in Norway into international and comparative perspectives.
- To take an initiative to more contact among language-policy actors with common interests that cross linguistic borders and ethnicity.

In an interview in December 2013, the leader of the language year project, the author Inger Johanne Sæterbakk, said that the language year had lived a life of its own; many arrangements occurred without central steering. No one knows how many there were, but it was more than a thousand. Sæterbakk said that she saw that the use of dialects have an emotional element, while written language is used more as a tool. While she regretted that it wasn't possible to engage minority language groups more, she was very pleased with the activity-level all around the country.
