= Suzannah Ibsen =

Norwegian wife of playwright Henrik Ibsen

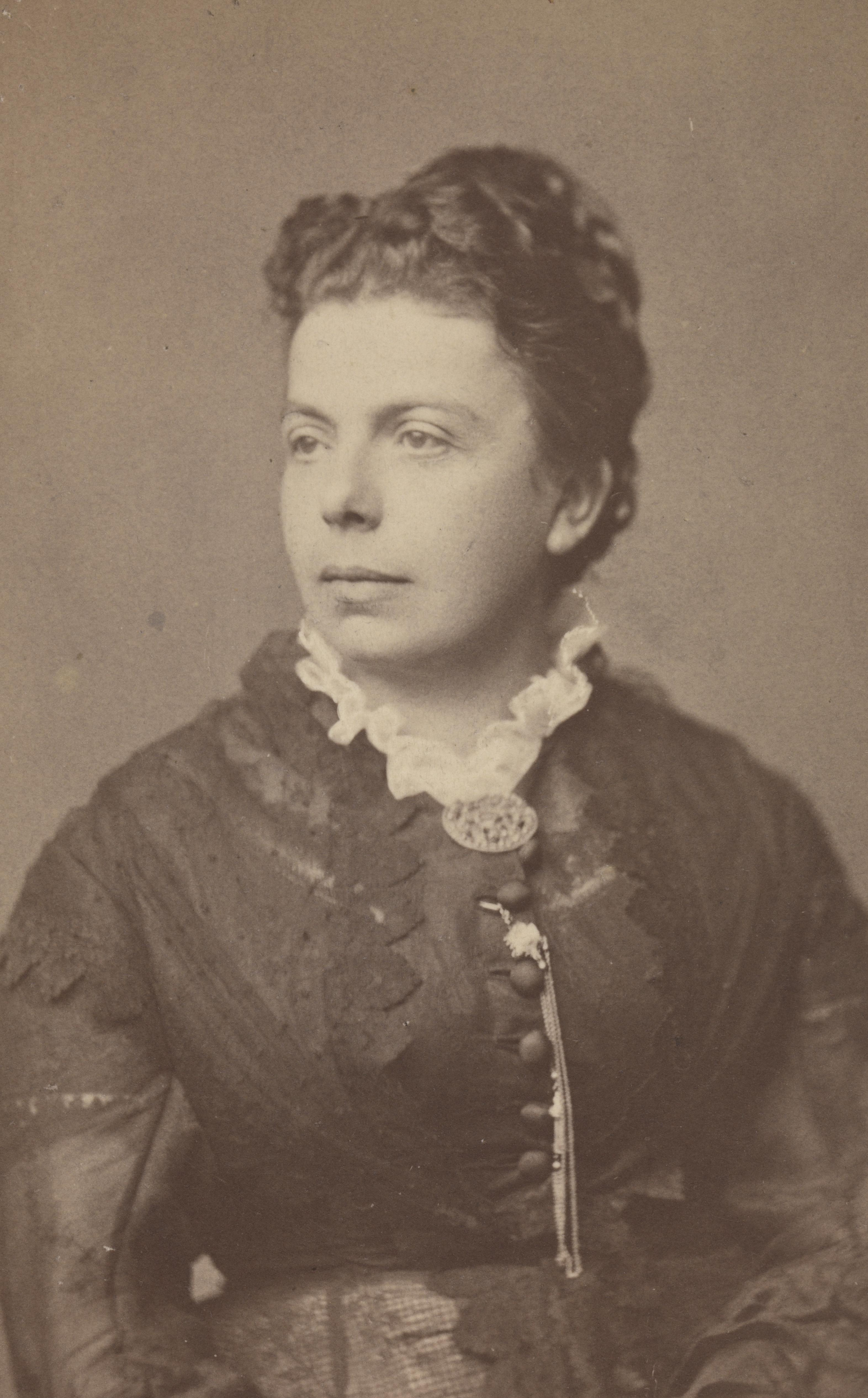
- Born: Suzannah Daae Thoresen; 26 June 1836; Herøy, Norway
- Died: 3 April 1914 (aged 77)
- Occupation: Wife of Henrik Ibsen
- Spouse: Henrik Ibsen (m. 1858; died 1906)
- Children: Sigurd Ibsen
- Father: Hans Conrad Thoresen

Suzannah Daae Ibsen (née Thoresen; 26 June 1836 – 3 April 1914) was a Norwegian woman who was the wife of playwright and poet Henrik Ibsen and mother of noted politician Sigurd Ibsen.

== Biography ==
Ibsen was born Suzannah Daae Thoresen in Herøy, Norway on 26 June 1836. Her parents were Hans Conrad Thoresen (1802–1858) and his second wife, Sara Margrethe Daae (1806–1841). After her mother's death in childbirth, her father married the family's Danish-born governess, Magdalene Kragh (1819–1903), who became a poet, novelist, short story writer and playwright. Her family subsequently moved to Bergen where her father was dean of the historic Holy Cross Church (Korskirken).

After the success of his first publicly successful drama The Feast at Solhaug, Ibsen was invited to Magdalene Thoresen’s literary salon. It was here he first met and fell in love with Suzannah. Henrik Ibsen was at this time the stage director at the Norwegian Theatre (Det Norske Theater) in Bergen. The two had been childhood friends and met each other for a second time at a ball where they did nothing but talk for the entire night instead of dance. Henrik later wrote a poem declaring his admiration for her, which appears to be about that night.

In 1858 Suzannah Ibsen translated Graf Waldemar (1847) by German dramatist Gustav Freytag into Norwegian. The play was first performed in September 1861.

Suzannah became engaged to Henrik Ibsen in January 1856 and they were married in June 1858. Their only child, Sigurd Ibsen, was born in December 1859. Sigurd, who too became an author and politician, married Bergliot Bjørnson, the daughter of Norwegian writer Bjørnstjerne Bjørnson. Suzannah and Bergliot's mother Karoline Bjornson had promised one another as girls that if one should have a son and the other a daughter, the two would marry. Although they made no arrangements for the promise to come true, when it became possible, their respective children did marry.

Suzannah raised her son Sigurd single-handedly, without the help of a nurse, in a way that she hoped would toughen him up. To her husband, she was a 'nanny' (as described by Bjornson) and encouraged him to write his plays even when he had lost hope as well as when he wished to divert his attention to painting. She apparently forced the pen into his hand at times, and she was the inspiration for many of Ibsen's famous characters, including Mrs Alving from Ghosts, Nora from A Doll's House, and Mother Åse from Peer Gynt. Suzannah was so like the characters she inspired in fact, that when Ibsen read Peer Gynt to his family and reached Mother Åse's lines, Sigurd cried out "But that's Mama!").

Her daughter-in-law Bergliot Ibsen wrote a book that was about her husband's famous family, titled De tre. Erindringer om Henrik Ibsen, Suzannah Ibsen, Sigurd Ibsen. Published in Norway during 1948, it was translated into English and published as The Three Ibsens in 1952.
