= Sigvald Skavlan =

Norwegian priest, psalmist and educator

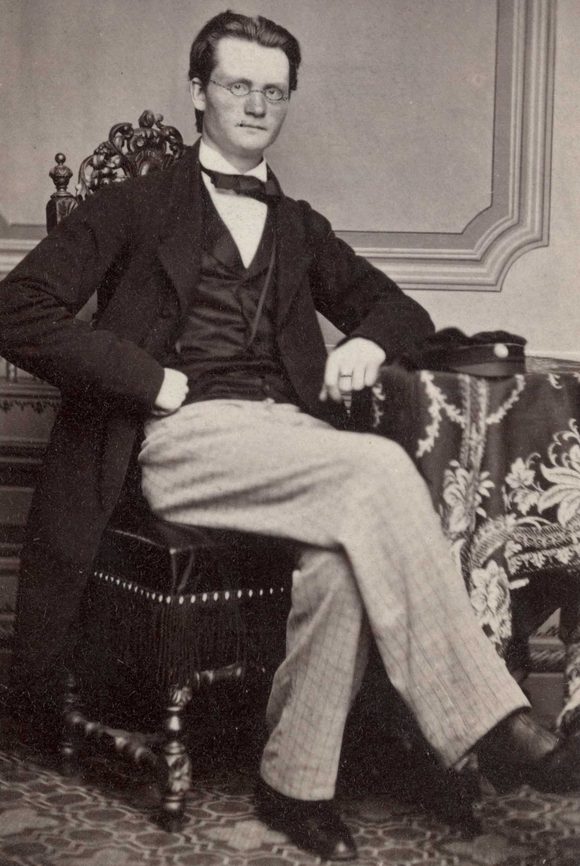
- Born: 27 December 1839; Stranda, Norway
- Died: 4 November 1912 (aged 72)
- Occupation(s): Priest and psalmist
- Father: Aage Schavland
- Relatives: Olaf Skavlan, Aage Skavlan and Harald Skavlan (brothers)

Sigvald Skavlan (27 December 1839 – 4 November 1912) was a Norwegian priest, psalmist and educator.

He was born at the Stranda Church vicarage in Stranda Municipality in Møre og Romsdal. He was the son of Aage Schavland (1806–1876) and Gerhardine Pauline Bergh (1817–1884). His father was a parish priest and later member of the Storting. After 1844, the family moved to Herøy Municipality. He was a brother of Olaf Skavlan, Aage Skavlan and Harald Skavlan, and uncle of Einar Skavlan.

Skavlan studied theology in Christiania (now Oslo) until 1864. He was one of the first three priests in Antwerp after the Norwegian Seaman's Mission was founded in 1865. He later lectured at Trondhjems Døvstummeinstitut, a school for the deaf in Trondheim, until he was appointed vicar in Askøy Municipality. In 1887 came to Vår Frue Church in Trondheim where he served until he retired.

He is probably best remembered for his cantatas and psalms. His psalm collection Stav og harpe was published posthumously in 1913. He was decorated Knight, First Class of the Order of St. Olav in 1897.
