= Ivar Aasen =

Norwegian philologist and lexicographer (1813–1896)

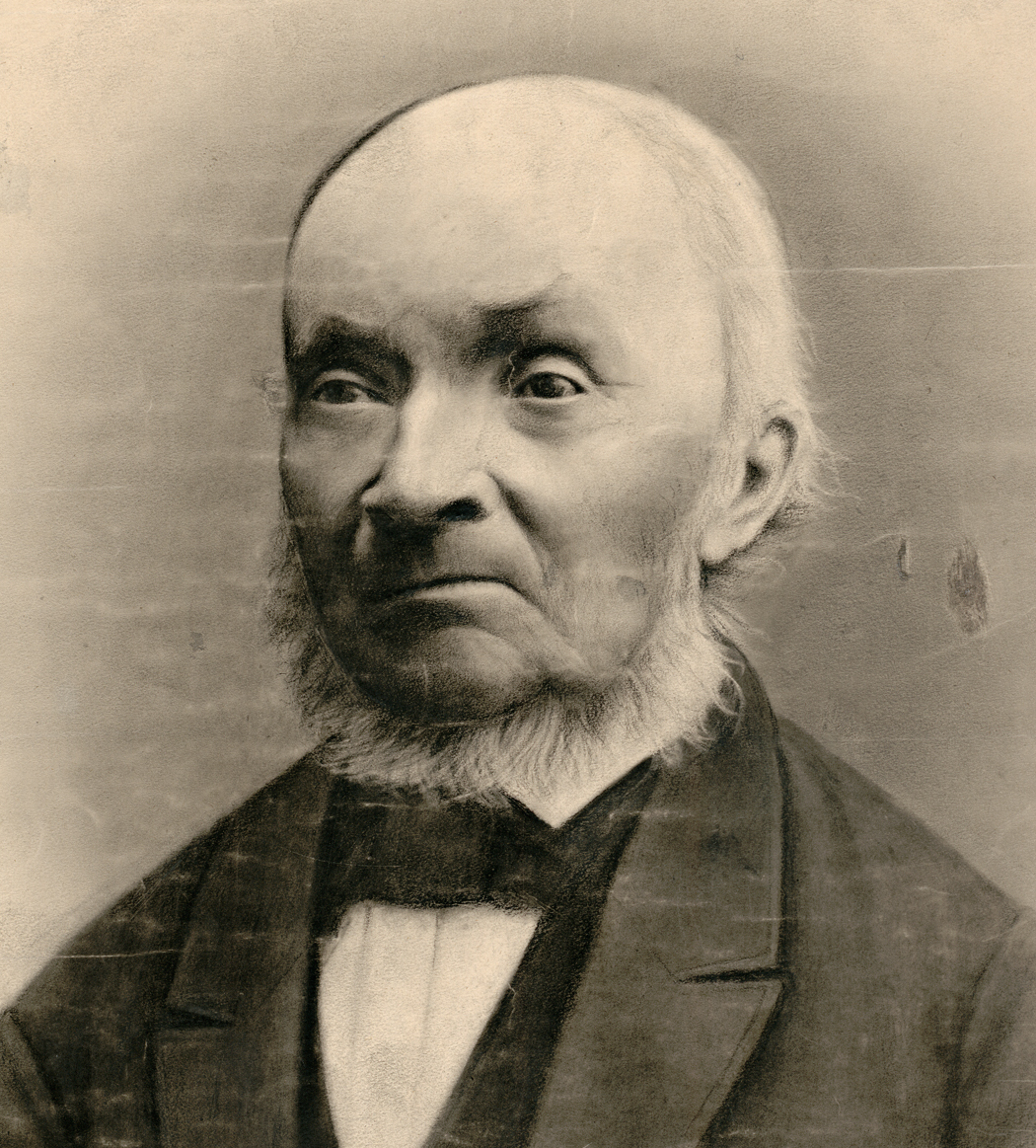
- Aasen in 1895
- Born: Iver Andreas Aasen; 5 August 1813; Ørsta, Norway
- Died: 23 September 1896 (aged 83); Christiania, Norway
- Occupations: Philologist, lexicographer, playwright, poet

Signature
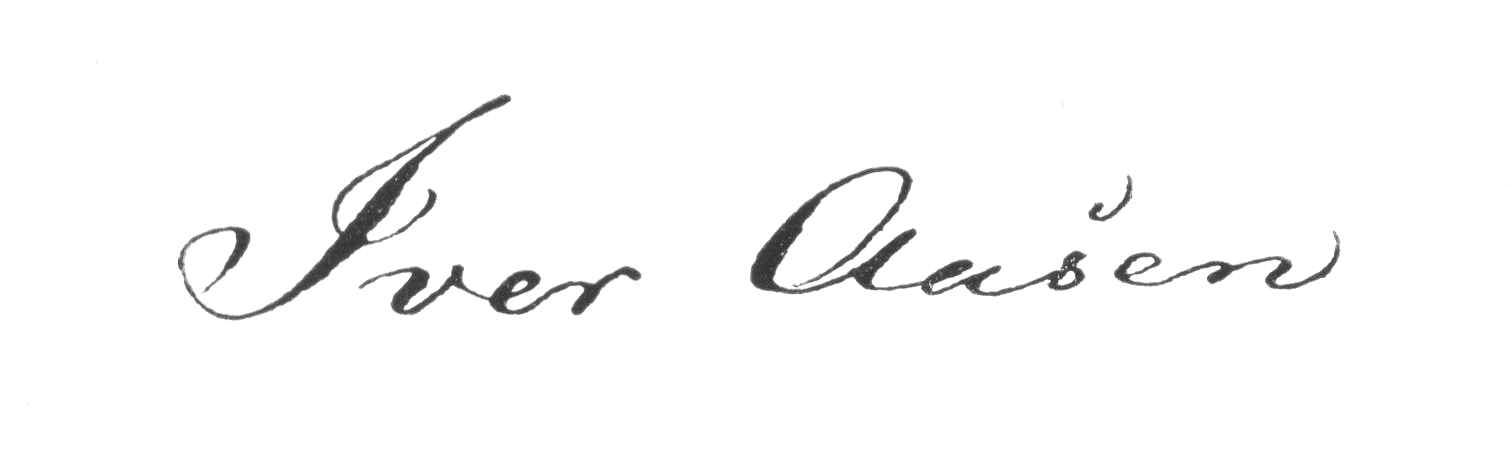

Ivar Andreas Aasen (Norwegian pronunciation: [ˈîːvɑr ˈòːsn̩]; 5 August 1813 – 23 September 1896) was a Norwegian philologist, lexicographer, playwright, and poet. He is best known for having assembled one of the two official written versions of the Norwegian language, Nynorsk, from various dialects.

Born into a family of farmers, Aasen showed an interest in reading from a young age. As a young adult, he received tutoring and learned several languages, before moving to Bergen in 1841. Once in Bergen, he was soon able to secure annual stipends for the purpose of travelling and performing research on the Norwegian dialects. In 1848 and 1850, respectively, he published a grammar and a dictionary of spoken Norwegian. After moving to Christiania (now Oslo) in 1847, Aasen continued his research and development of the language which he called Landsmål, publishing new versions of both the grammar and the dictionary. He also wrote poems and plays in the new language. He died in Christiania on 23 September 1896 and was buried with public honours.

Landsmål became a co-official language of Norway alongside Riksmål. After Aasen's death, Landsmål was renamed to Nynorsk and Riksmål became Bokmål. Today, Nynorsk is a minority language in Norway, though it enjoys an equal legal status to Bokmål.

== Background ==
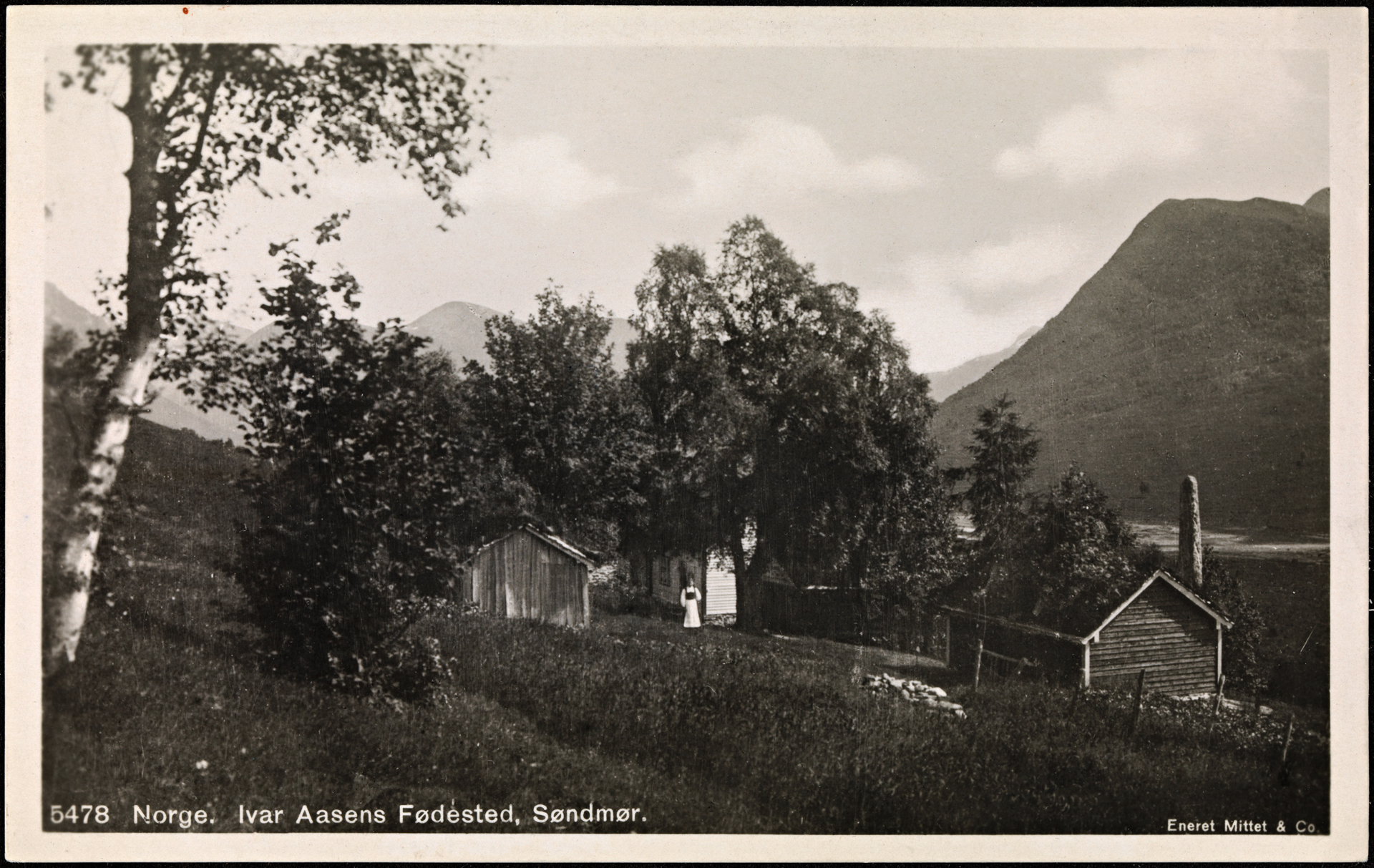
Aasen's birthplace

Iver Andreas Aasen was born on 5 August 1813 in Åsen (also spelled as Aasen at the time), inside the parish of Ørsten (now Ørsta Municipality) in Sunnmøre, on the west coast of Norway. His father, Ivar Jonsson, was a small-scale farmer who died in 1826. Iver mainly performed farmwork during his childhood, spending virtually all of his leisure time reading, and developing an interest in botany. When he was eighteen, he opened an elementary school in his native parish. In 1833, he was tutored by Hans Conrad Thoresen, the husband of the eminent writer Magdalene Thoresen, in the parish of Herø (now Herøy Municipality), where he learned basic Latin. Aasen gradually mastered several languages and began to scientifically study their structure.

== Career ==
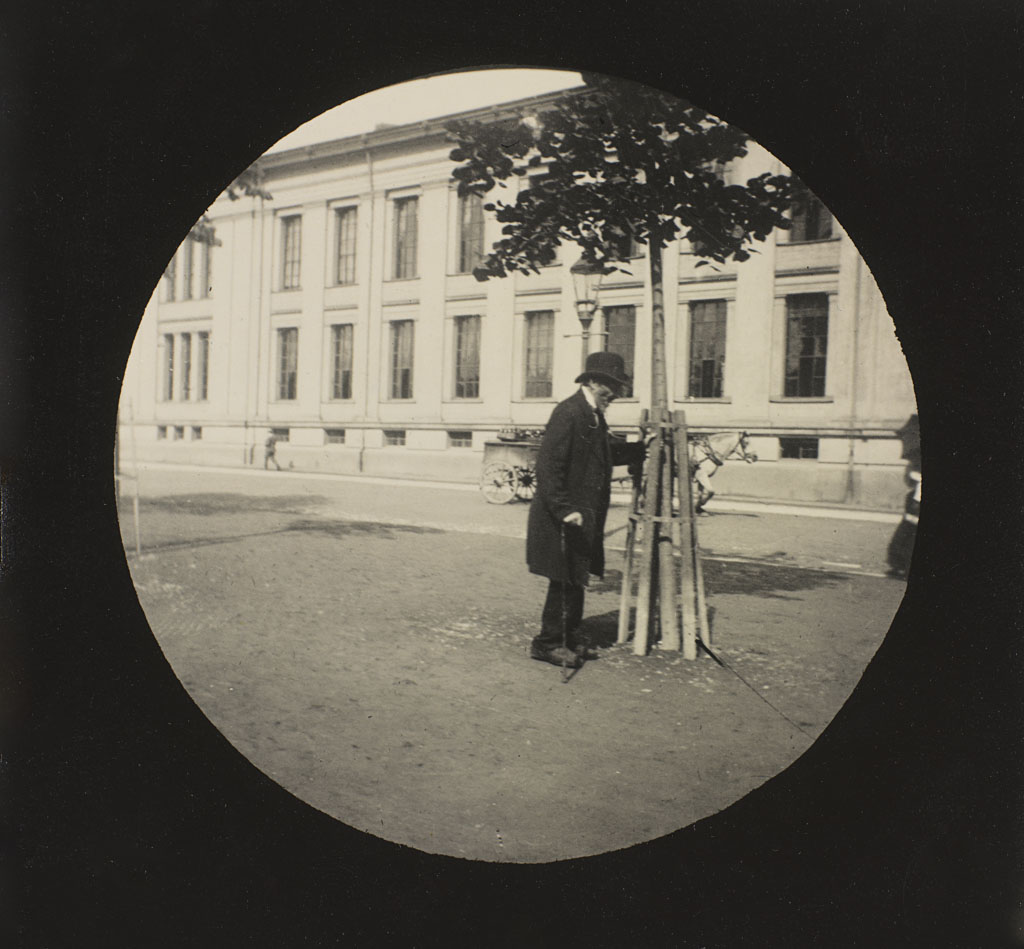
Aasen in Oslo, captured by Carl Størmer's spy camera

When Aasen travelled to Bergen in 1841, he met Bishop Jacob Neumann, who would publish excerpts of his work in the Bergens Stiftstidende ("Bergen Diocese Newspaper"). The rector of Trondheim, Fredrik M. Bugge, would eventually find Neumann's articles while visiting Bergen, and persuaded the Royal Norwegian Society of Sciences and Letters to provide financial support to cover his expenses as he travelled across Norway. The society agreed, providing him with a generous annual grant of 120-200 speciedaler. In 1842, Aasen began receiving an additional stipend enabling him to give his entire attention to his philological investigations.

Aasen's first monograph, a small collection of folk songs in the dialect of his native Sunnmøre, was published in 1843 to favorable reception. After researching every major dialect of the Norwegian language, Aasen published his Grammar of the Norwegian Dialects (Danish: Det Norske Folkesprogs Grammatik) in 1848, followed by the more well-known Dictionary of the Norwegian Dialects (Danish: Ordbog over det Norske Folkesprog) in 1850. The dictionary became the basis of his construction of a popular language or definite folke-maal (lit. 'people's language') for Norway.

By 1853, he had created the methods by which his new language would be used, which he called Landsmål. After certain modifications, including a policy aiming to merge Landsmål with Dano-Norwegian, Landsmål eventually evolved into Nynorsk (lit. 'New/Modern Norwegian').

Aasen composed poems and plays in Landsmål to demonstrate its usage. One of these dramas, The Heir (1855), became very popular throughout Norway, and would eventually inspire writers from Aasmund Vinje to Arne Garborg. In 1856, he published Norske Ordsprog, a treatise on Norwegian proverbs. He also wrote numerous essays, many of which were published in Vinje's newspaper Dølen.

Throughout most of his career, Aasen lived quietly in lodgings in Oslo (then Christiania), where he moved in 1847, surrounding himself with books and keeping a low public profile. His name came into political favour as his ideas about the language of the peasants became popular in the strands of agrarian populism. In 1864, Aasen published Danish: Norsk Grammatik, the definitive grammar of Nynorsk, and in 1873 he published the final version of his dictionary, now titled Norsk Ordbog 'Norwegian Dictionary'. He continued researching the Norwegian language until his death, but wrote little after this.

He died in Christiania on 23 September 1896 and was buried with public honours.

== Legacy ==
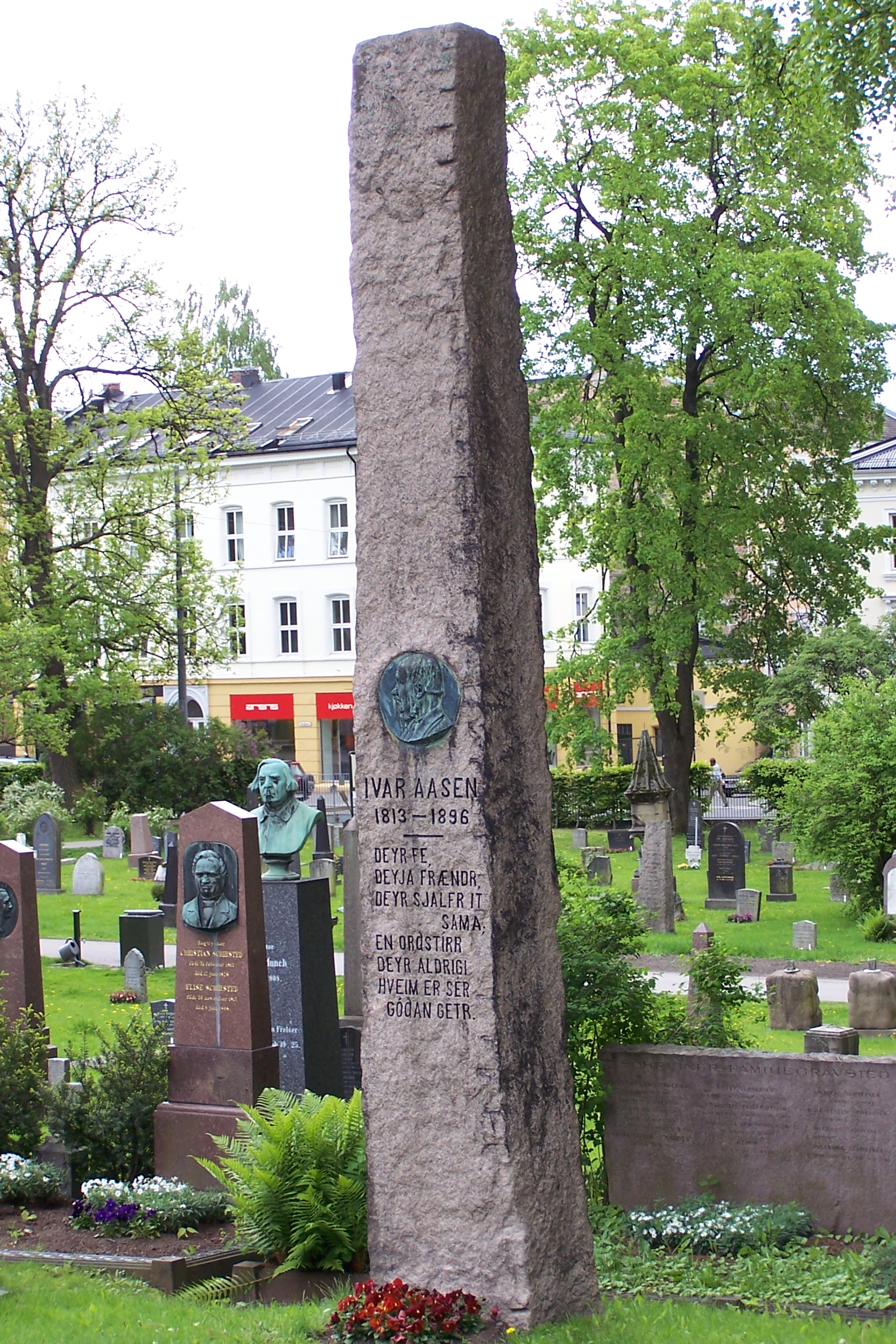
Tomb of Ivar Aasen at Vår Frelsers gravlund, Oslo

=== Nynorsk ===
Landsmål, standardised by Aasen, later evolved into Nynorsk (lit. 'New/Modern Norwegian'), emerging as the second of Norway's two official languages (the other being Bokmål, the Dano-Norwegian descendant of the Danish language used in Norway in Aasen's time). An unofficial variety of Norwegian closer to Aasen's language is still found in Høgnorsk (lit. 'High Norwegian'). Since the early 2000s, linguist Kenneth Katzner considered Nynorsk as on equal footing with Bokmål, as Bokmål tended to be used more in radio, television, and most newspapers, whereas Nynorsk was used equally as much in government work, and approximately in 17% of schools.

Nynorsk is both a written and spoken language.

=== Ivar Aasen-tunet ===
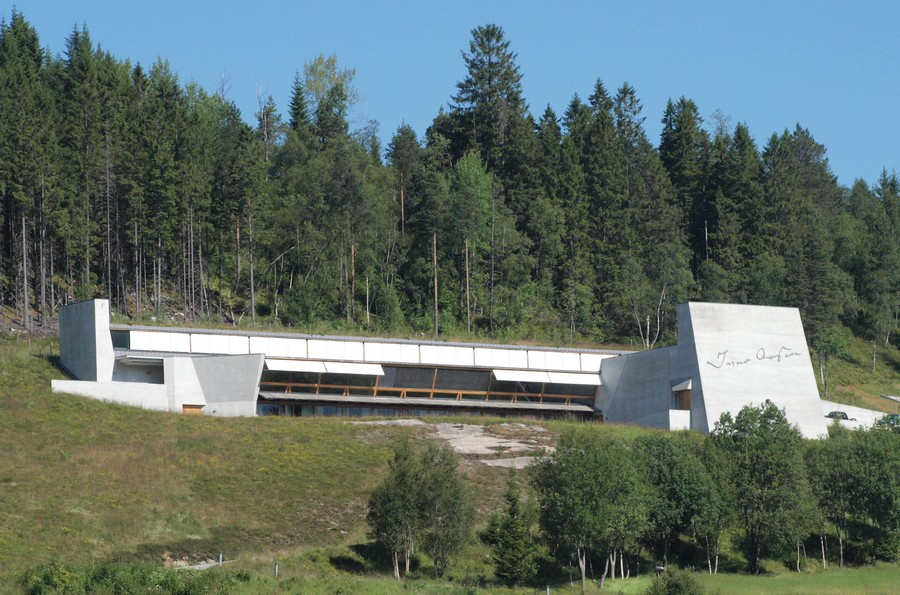
Ivar Aasen-tunet at Ørsta

Ivar Aasen-tunet, an institution devoted to the Nynorsk language, opened in June 2000. The building in Ørsta was designed by Norwegian architect Sverre Fehn. Their web page includes most of Aasen's texts, an "internet library" dedicated to other examples of Nynorsk literature, and articles about linguistic history in Norway.

=== The Language Year 2013 ===
Språkåret 2013 (The Language Year 2013) celebrated Ivar Aasen's 200th anniversary, as well as the 100th anniversary of Det Norske Teateret. The year's main focus was to celebrate linguistic diversity in Norway. In a poll released in connection with the celebration, 56% of Norwegians said they held positive views of Aasen, while 7% held negative views. On 5 August 2013, Bergens Tidende, which is normally published mainly in Bokmål, published an edition fully in Nynorsk in memory of Aasen.

=== Nynorsk Day and Nynorsk Week ===
Nynorskdagen (Nynorsk Day) falls on the 12th of May every year. It commemorates the day of Jamstillingsvedtaket, the law making Landsmål/Nynorsk an official language of Norway alongside Danish (later Bokmål). Noregs Mållag, the main organisation for Nynorsk, encourages people and organisations that typically do not use Nynorsk to write in the language on this day. Several companies, notably Vipps and Ruter, have released Nynorsk language support for their mobile apps on the 12th of May. In 2025, Noregs Mållag announced Nynorsk Day would be expanded into a Nynorsk Week from the 6 to the 12 of May.

== Select bibliography ==
Aasen published a wide range of material, some of which were released posthumously.

=== Prose ===
- Det norske Folkesprogs Grammatik [Grammar of the Norwegian People's Language]. Kristiania. 1848.
- Ordbog over det norske Folkesprog [Dictionary of the Norwegian People's Language]. Kristiania. 1850.
- Skrifter i samling. Trykt og utrykt [Collected works: Published and unpublished]. Kristiania. 1911–1912. 3 volumes.
- Koht, Halvdan, ed. (1917). Reise-Erindringer og Reise-Indberetninger 1842–1847 [Travel Memories and Travel Reports 1842–1847]. Trondhjem: Det kongelige norske videnskabers selskab.

=== Poetry ===
- Symra [Anemone]. Kristiania. 1863. – Poetry collection. Revised editions in 1867 and 1875.

=== Plays ===
- I marknaden 'In the Market', 1954
- Ervingen 'The Heir', 1955
