= Kenneth Katzner =

American linguist

- Born: 1930; Washington, DC, US
- Died: May 25, 2003 (aged 72); Washington, DC, US
- Employers: Central Intelligence Agency; United States Department of Defense

Kenneth Katzner (1930 − May 25, 2003) was an American linguist. An expert on the Russian language, Katzner worked as an analyst on Soviet affairs for the Central Intelligence Agency and the United States Department of Defense during the Cold War, and was an author of several notable works on the Russian language.

== Biography ==
Kenneth Katzner was born in Washington, D.C., and was raised in Forest Hills, New York. He studied Russian at Cornell University, from which he graduated in 1952. Having received intensive Russian language training at the Syracuse University Language Program, Katzner later served in the Air Force in England as a communications intelligence officer.

In the 1960s, Katzner was a writer and editor in New York City, contributing to Encyclopædia Britannica and The American Heritage Dictionary of the English Language.

An authority on the Russian language, Katzner worked as a Soviet expert in the Central Intelligence Agency during the 1970s, and for the United States Department of Defense in the 1980s and 1990s.

Katzner was the author of several works on linguistics and Russian affairs, and his books were used as reference guides by journalists. His English-Russian, Russian-English Dictionary, which Katzner had worked on for 18 years, sold in the hundreds of thousands and was pirated in the former Soviet Union. He continued working on new editions of this work up to the time of his death.

Katzner was an avid photographer and a skilled bridge player. His wife of 36 years was Betty Lenson Katzner of Washington. Katzner died of lung cancer at Sibley Memorial Hospital on May 25, 2003, at the age of 72. He was survived by his wife.
