= Olaf Skavlan =

Norwegian literary historian and playwright

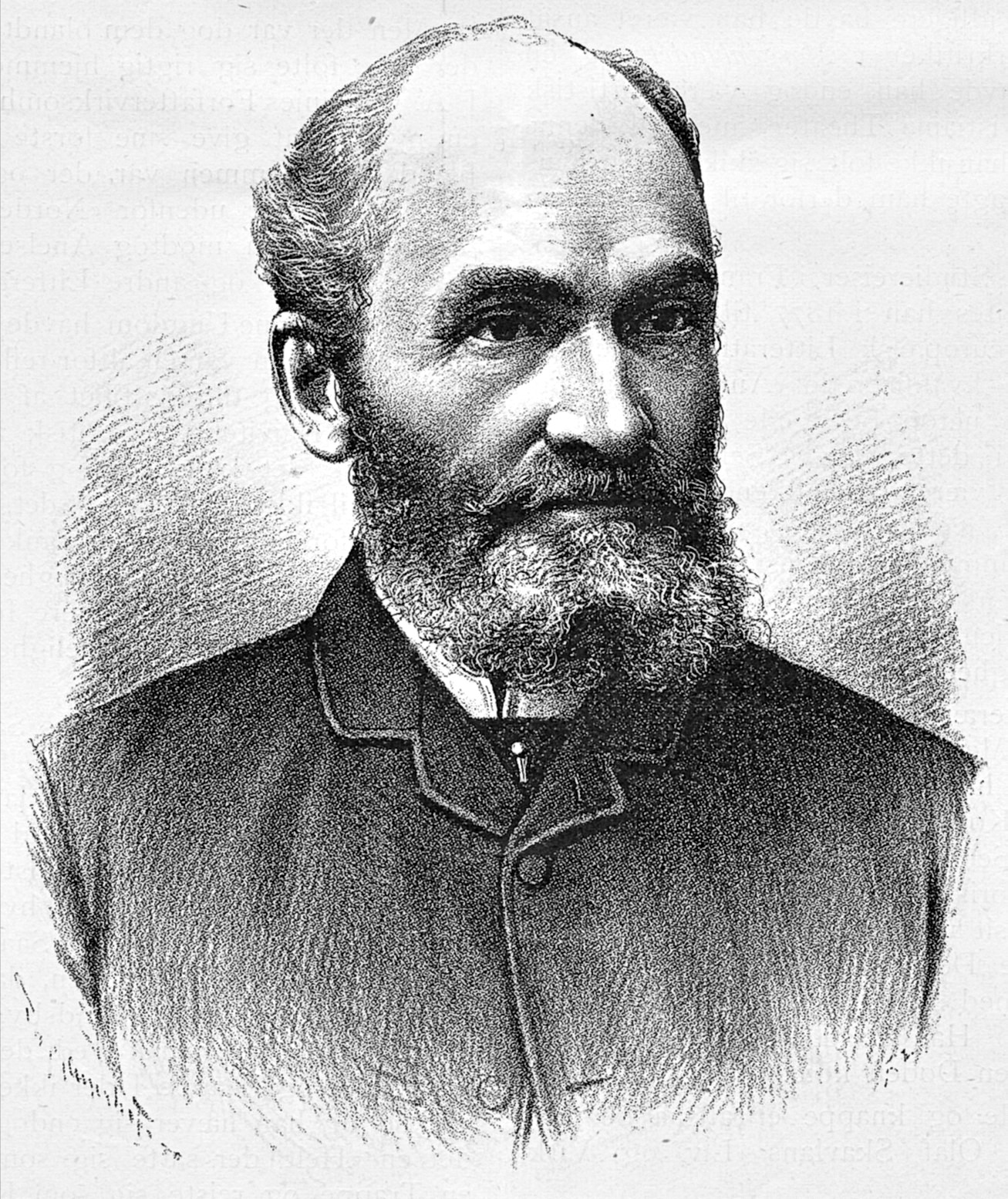
Olaf Skavlan. Engraving by an unknown artist in the Skilling-Magazin, 1 August 1891.

Olaf Skavlan (25 January 1838 – 30 May 1891) was a Norwegian literary historian and playwright.

== Personal life ==
Skavlan was born as Ole Skavlan in Stranda Municipality, a son of vicar and politician Aage Schavland (1806–1876) and his wife Gerhardine Pauline Bergh (1817–1884). He was a brother of Sigvald Skavlan, Einar Skavlan, Sr., Aage Skavlan and Harald Skavlan.

In August 1879, Skavlan married Dagmar Kielland (1855–1931) in Stavanger. Through this marriage he became a son-in-law of Jens Zetlitz Kielland, as well as a brother-in-law of Ludvig Daae, Elling Holst, Kitty Lange Kielland, Alexander Kielland, Jacob Kielland and Tycho Kielland.

Skavlan was the father of Einar Skavlan, father-in-law of Arnstein Arneberg, and grandfather of Merete Skavlan.

== Career ==
Skavlan debuted as a fiction writer as a student. In 1871, he earned a doctorate on the thesis Holberg som Komedieforfatter, about Ludvig Holberg as a comedy writer. In the periodical Nyt norsk Tidsskrift, he published a study of Henrik Wergeland's work Skabelsen, Mennesket og Messias. This contributed to an understanding of Wergeland as a liberal political figure, not following the politically conservative tradition that branded Wergelenad as an apolitical wordsmith. Skavlan was appointed as a professor at the Royal Frederick University in 1877. He also co-founded and edited the satirical magazine Vikingen, and between 1882 and 1887 published the periodical Nyt tidsskrift together with Ernst Sars. In 1884, he became a co-founder of the Norwegian Association for Women's Rights, and he was a member of its first board of directors.

Skavlan died in May 1891 in Kristiania.
