= Merete Skavlan =

Norwegian actress, theater instructor, and director (1920–2018)

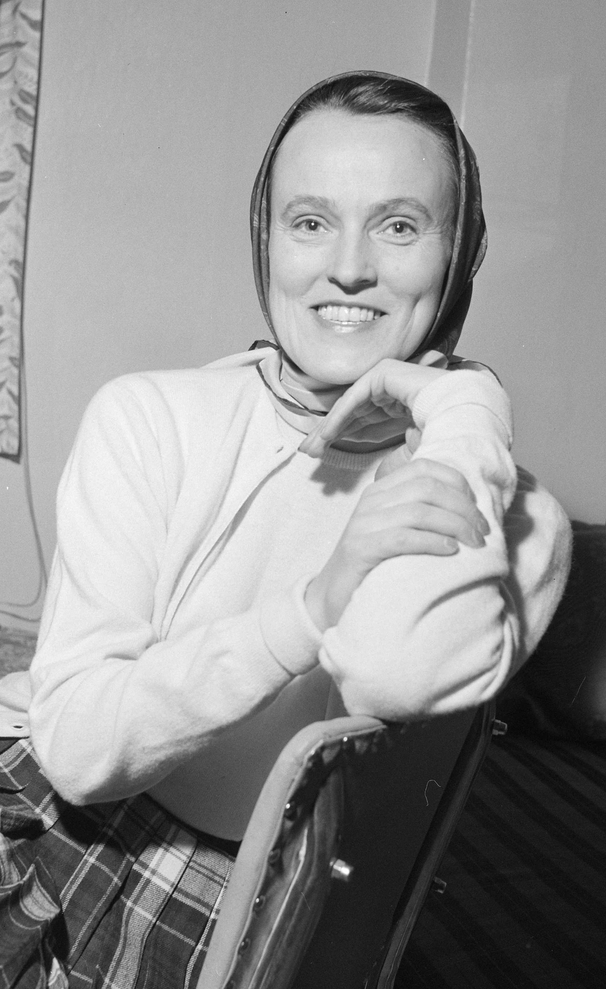
- Merete Skavlan in 1958
- Born: 25 July 1920; Kristiania, Norway
- Died: 2 November 2018 (aged 98); Oslo, Norway
- Occupations: Actress; Theatre director
- Partner: Per Sunderland.
- Parent: Einar Skavlan
- Relatives: Olaf Skavlan (grandfather).

Merete Skavlan (25 July 1920 – 2 November 2018) was a Norwegian actress, theater instructor and director.

She was born in Kristiania as a daughter of newspaper editor and theatre director Einar Skavlan and music educator Margrethe Bartholdy. She was a granddaughter of literary historian Olaf Skavlan.

She was involved in resistance work during World War II, and joined the unofficial "Stanislavskij Group" in 1943. The members of this group founded Studioteatret, and she made her debut at Studioteatret's first performance in 1945, in a translation of Wilder's play The Long Christmas Dinner. She continued to play for Studioteatret until 1950.

Her acting career continued at Det Nye Teater, where she played from 1950 to 1952, at Folketeatret from 1952 to 1959, and at Oslo Nye Teater from 1959 to 1967. During the 1960s she also played for Fjernsynsteatret, with roles such as Angustias in an adaptation of García Lorca's The House of Bernarda Alba, and as Missis Smith in Ionesco's The Bald Soprano.

She started working as a theatre instructor, and has participated on productions at Riksteatret, the National Theatre, Det Norske Teatret and Fjernsynsteatret. Her debut as producer was an adaptation for television of Baroness Emma Orczy's novel The Scarlet Pimpernel, for Fjernsynsteatret in 1968. Her debut as stage producer was an adaptation of Bill Naughton's play Spring and Port Wine, for Det Norske Teatret in 1969. She also lectured at the Norwegian National Academy of Theatre.

From 1984 to 1990 she was employed at the Norwegian Broadcasting Corporation as head of Radioteatret. She started the independent theatre group Intimteatret in 1991, together with Gerhard Knoop.

Skavlan was also a board member of Dagbladet from 1960 to 1974, and subsequently sat on the supervisory council. She died in November 2018 at the age of 98.

Cultural offices
Preceded by Gerhard Knoop	Director of Radioteatret; 1984–1990	Succeeded by Nils Nordberg
