= Søndre Bergenhus Amtstidende =

Norwegian newspaper

Søndre Bergenhus Amtstidende was a Norwegian newspaper, published in Voss Municipality in Hordaland county.

It had its roots in the newspaper Wossingen, published as far away as Leland, Illinois, in 1857 by the Norwegian emigrant Niels T. Bakkethun. It went defunct around New Year's of 1859. After fighting in the American Civil War, Bakkethun returned to Norway around 1870, and in late 1871 he started publishing Vossingen in Voss. It was an apolitical newspaper, but as Bakkethun returned to the US it was bought by liberal men. However, the fourth owner aligned the newspaper with what would become the Conservative Party. He also changed the name to Søndre Bergenhus Amtstidende on 11 January 1878. The conservative newspaper was out-competed by the liberal Vossebladet, and went defunct after its last issue on 31 December 1891.
