= Aage Skavlan =

Norwegian historian (1847–1920)

Aage Gerhard Skavlan (22 December 1847 – 24 February 1920) was a Norwegian historian.

He was born in Herøy Municipality as a son of dean Aage Schavland (1806–1876) and his wife Gerhardine Pauline Bergh (1817–1884). He was a great-grandnephew of vicar Jacob Schavland, nephew of vicar Gerhard B. Bergh and a brother of Sigvald Skavlan, Einar Skavlan, Sr., Olaf Skavlan and Harald Skavlan.

He graduated from Trondhjem Cathedral School in 1868 and took the cand.theol. degree in 1872. He spent his early career as a school teacher, but also researched history. He was given a royal scholarship in 1877 to conduct studies at the University of Copenhagen and Lund University, and in 1878 he published his first book Historiske Billeder fra den nyere Tid i Danmark, Norge og tildels Sverige. In 1881 he received a parliamentary grant to write a history on Norway in 1814; he released books on this topic in 1882, 1884, 1892 and 1899. He worked as archivist in Trondhjem from 1890 to 1891, and at the University Library of Oslo from 1899. After 1900 his research was hampered by illness. He did not marry, and died in February 1920 in Kristiania.
