= Stranda Church =

Church in Møre og Romsdal, Norway

- Stranda kyrkje
- Sløgstad kyrkje
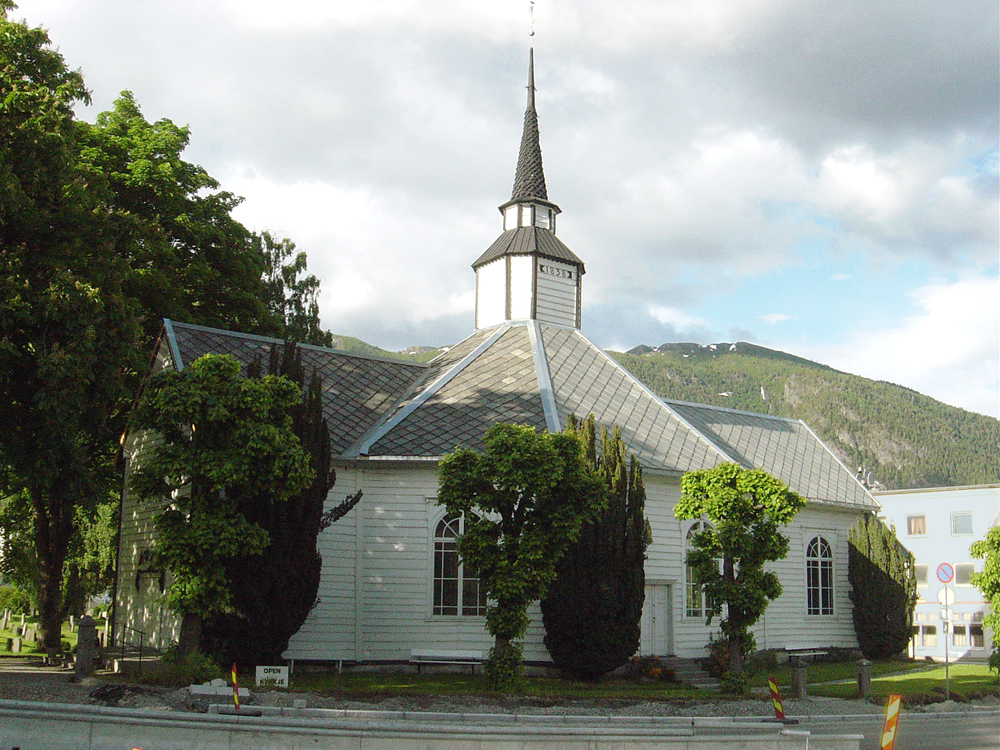
- View of the church
- Stranda Church
- 62°18′30″N 6°56′51″E
- Location: Stranda Municipality, Møre og Romsdal
- Country: Norway
- Denomination: Church of Norway
- Churchmanship: Evangelical Lutheran

History
- Status: Parish church
- Founded: 13th century
- Consecrated: 30 Sept 1838

Architecture
- Functional status: Active
- Architectural type: Octagonal
- Completed: 1838 (188 years ago)

Specifications
- Capacity: 260
- Materials: Wood

Administration
- Diocese: Møre bispedømme
- Deanery: Nordre Sunnmøre prosti
- Parish: Stranda
- Norwegian Cultural Heritage Site
- Type: Church
- Status: Automatically protected
- ID: 85597

Stranda Church or Sløgstad Church (Norwegian: Stranda kyrkje / Sløgstad kyrkje) is a parish church of the Church of Norway in Stranda Municipality in Møre og Romsdal county, Norway. It is located in the village of Stranda, along the western shore of the Storfjorden. It is the church for the Stranda parish which is part of the Nordre Sunnmøre prosti (deanery) in the Diocese of Møre. The white, wooden church was built in an octagonal style in 1838 by an unknown architect. The church seats about 260 people.

== History ==
The earliest existing historical records of the church date back to 1432 when it was mentioned in Aslak Bolt's cadastre, but the church was not new that year. The first church in Stranda was a wooden stave church, located on the same site as the present-day church. The church may have been first constructed in the 13th century. Originally, the church was built in a long church design, but at some point in the 1500s or 1600s, the church was enlarged by adding timber-framed transepts to the north and south of the nave to create a cruciform floor plan. In the 1720s, it was described as having a nave that measured 36 by 22 feet (11.0 m × 6.7 m), a choir that measured 20 by 22 feet (6.1 m × 6.7 m), and the cross-arms were each 20 by 22 feet (6.1 m × 6.7 m).

On 8 January 1731, there was a large rockslide on the nearly vertical Skafjellet mountain that is located across the Storfjorden from the church. This rockslide fell into the fjord and caused a small megatsunami to rush across the fjord. The wave destroyed the church which sat on the shore as well as many of the surrounding buildings. A new church was built that same year, but it was built about 150 metres (490 ft) to the northwest on higher ground. The new church was a timber-framed building with a cruciform design. The old cemetery that surrounded the old church was maintained and no new cemetery was built by the new church.

In 1814, this church served as an election church (Norwegian: valgkirke). Together with more than 300 other parish churches across Norway, it was a polling station for elections to the 1814 Norwegian Constituent Assembly which wrote the Constitution of Norway. This was Norway's first national elections. Each church parish was a constituency that elected people called "electors" who later met together in each county to elect the representatives for the assembly that was to meet at Eidsvoll Manor later that year.

In 1838, a new church was built on the site of the old church (closer to the fjord). It was a timber-framed building with an octagonal floor plan. The building had a choir extension in the east, a church porch in the west, and a small tower on the roof above the middle of the nave. The new church was built by the carpenter Knut S. Øye. The new church was consecrated on 30 September 1838. After this, the old church was torn down. The choir was expanded in 1927, and at the same time there was a sacristy added on the east side of the choir.

== Media gallery ==
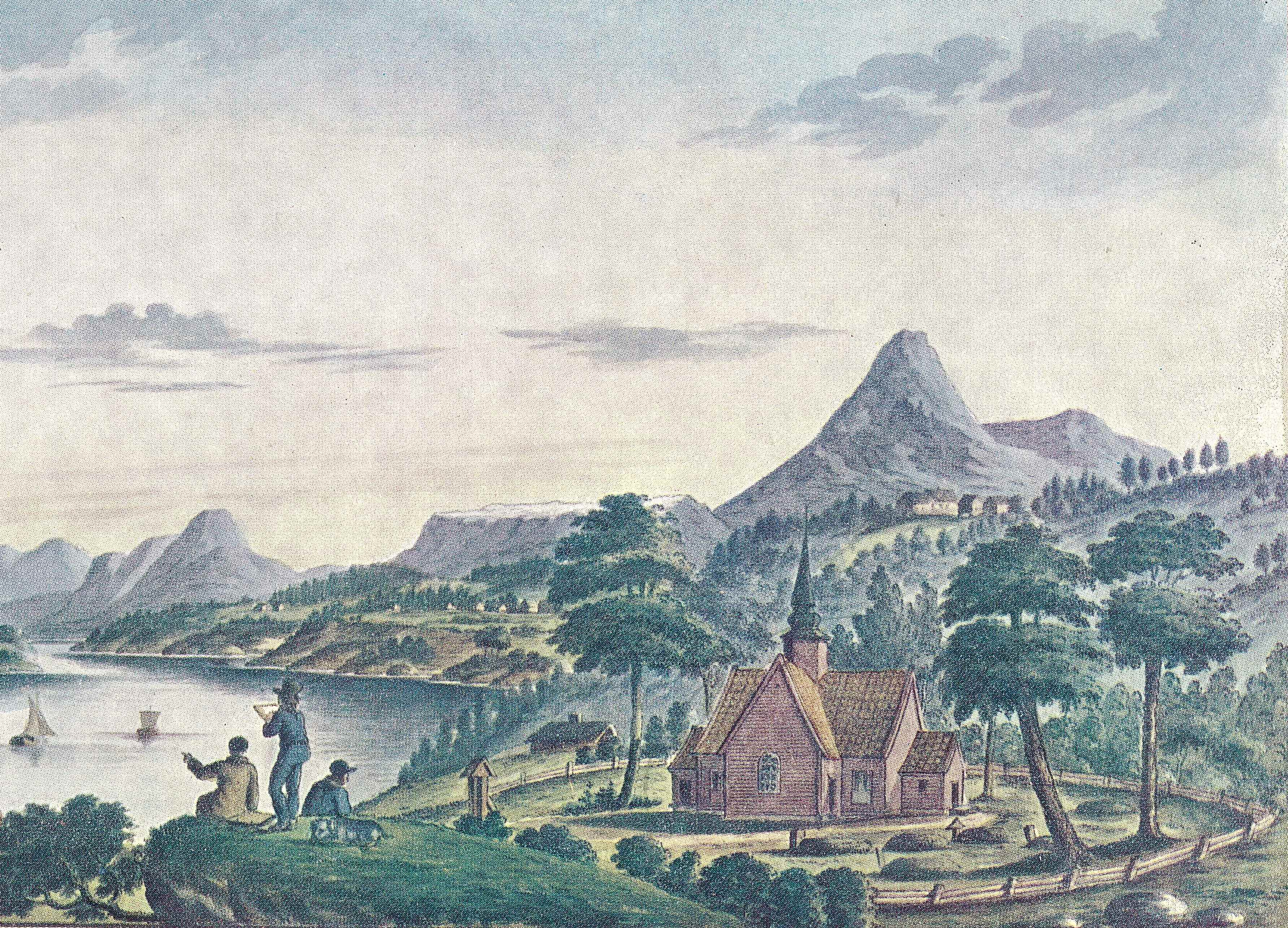
Painting of the old church (1731-1838)

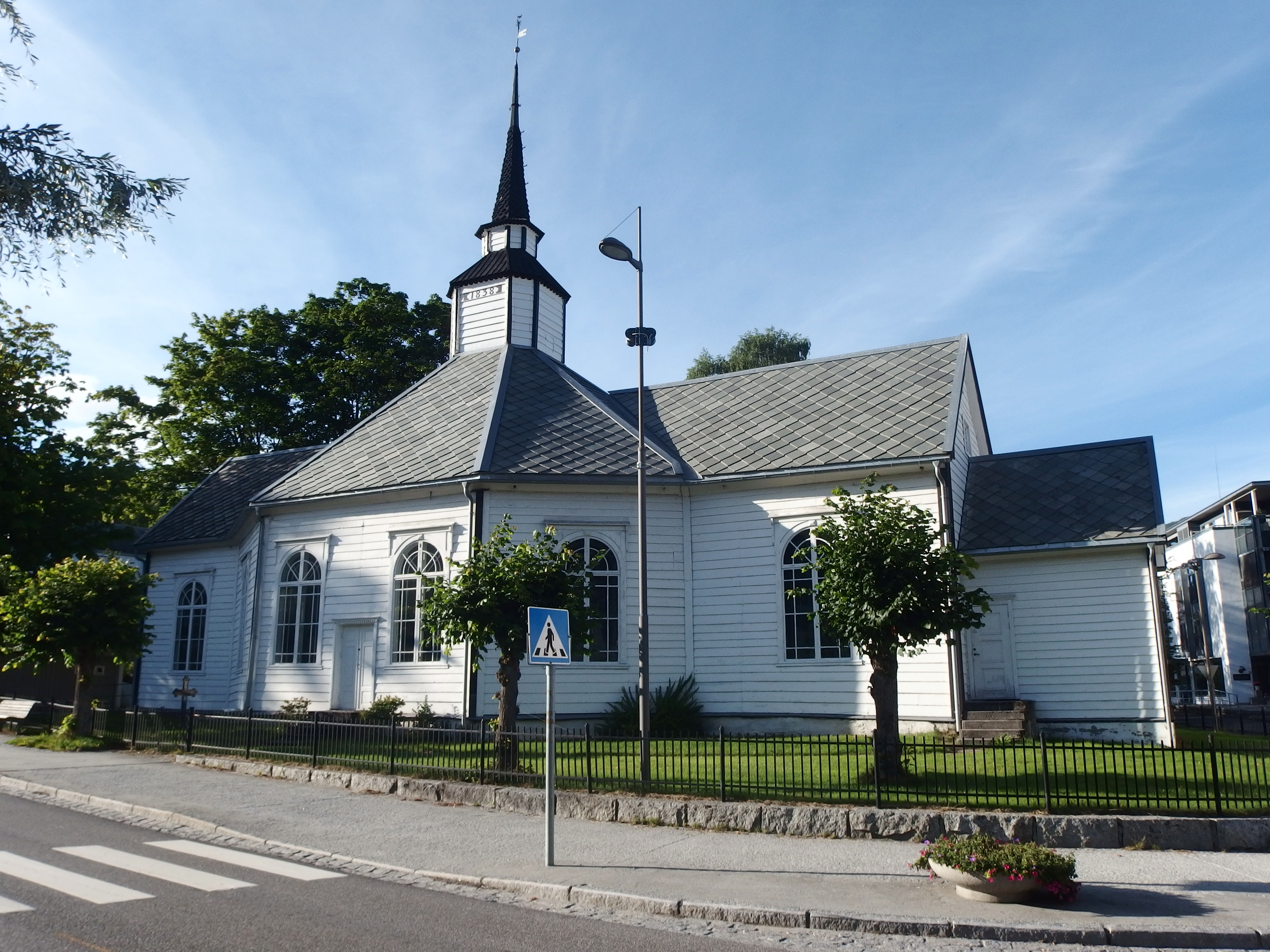

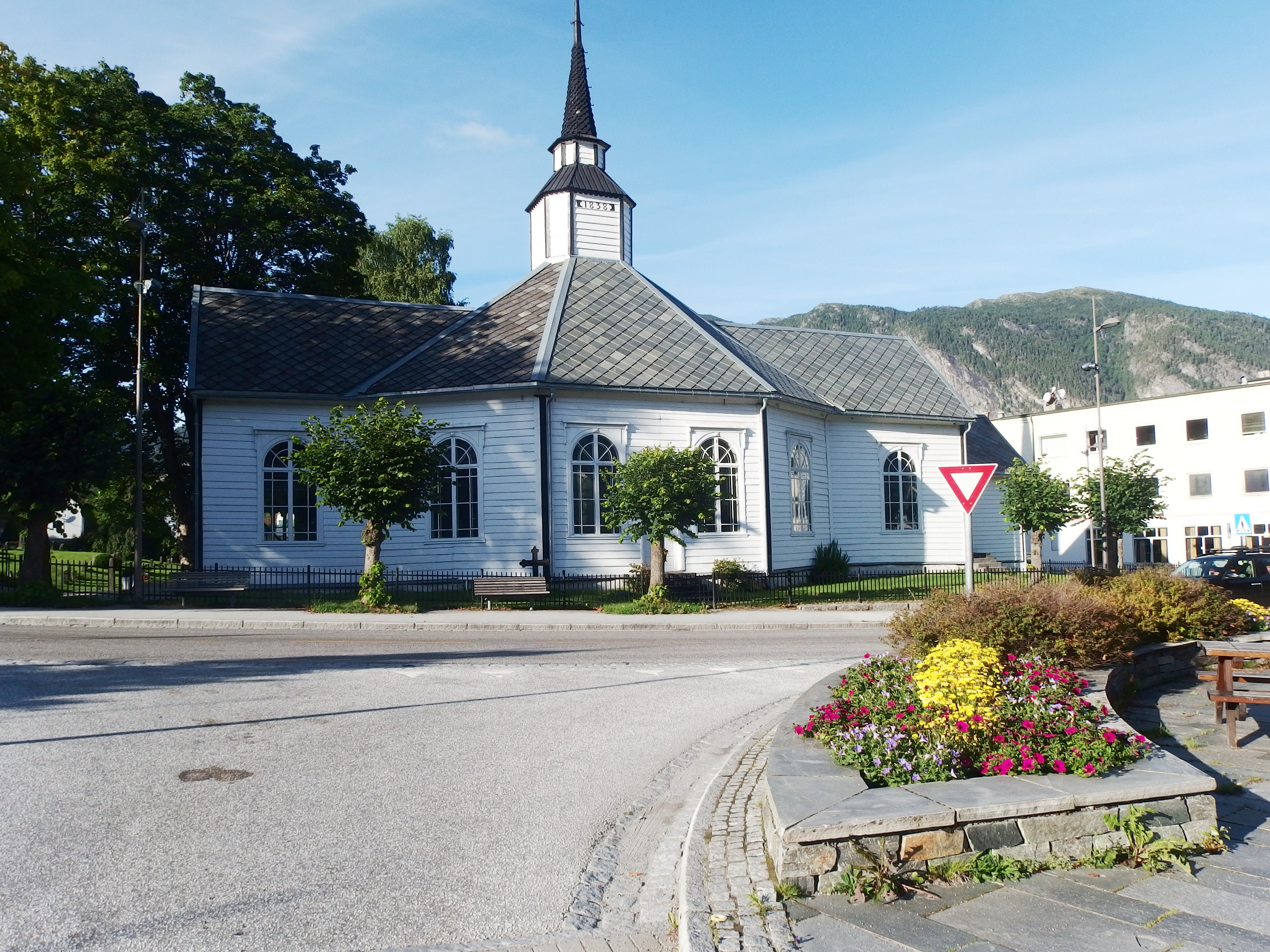

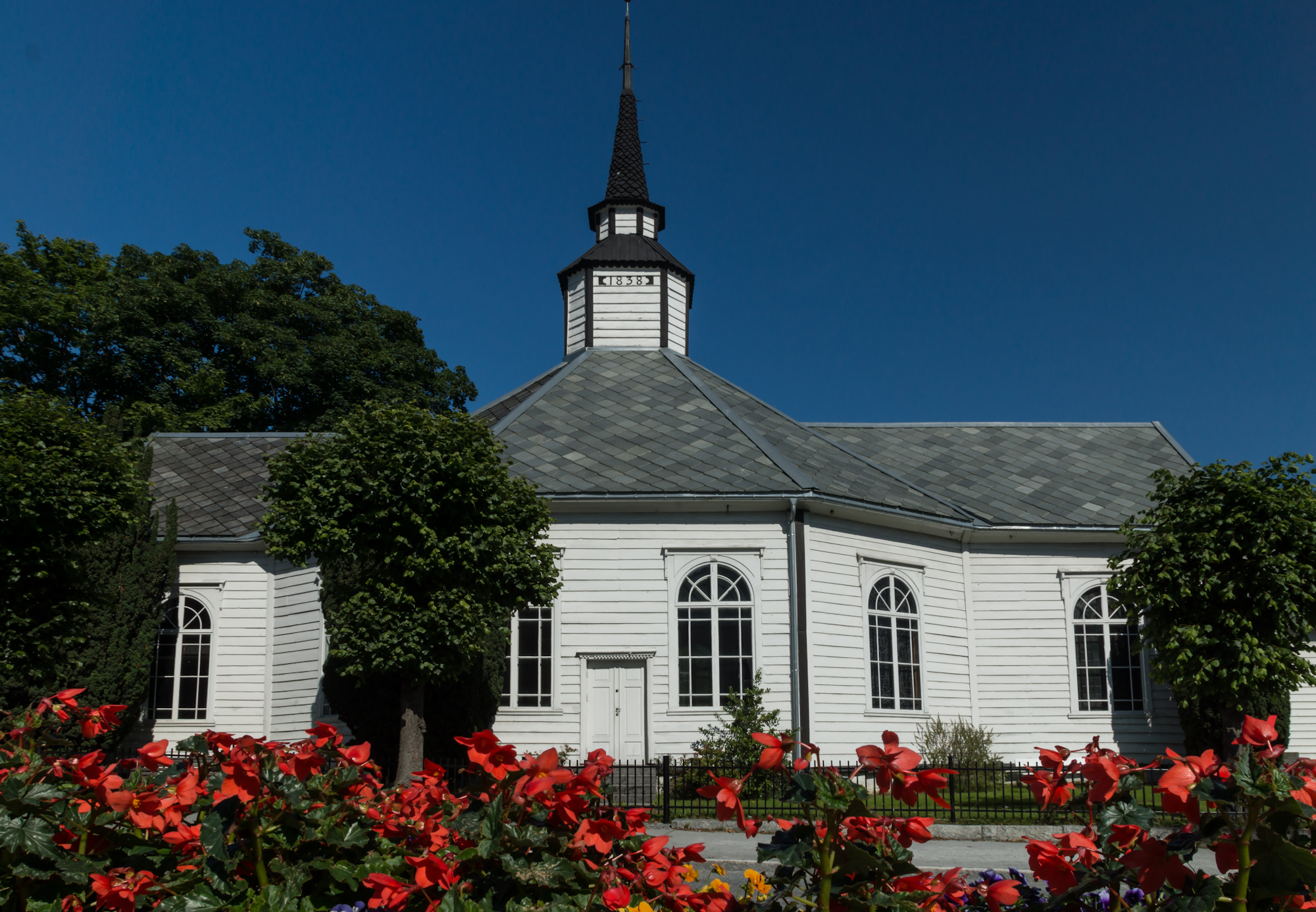

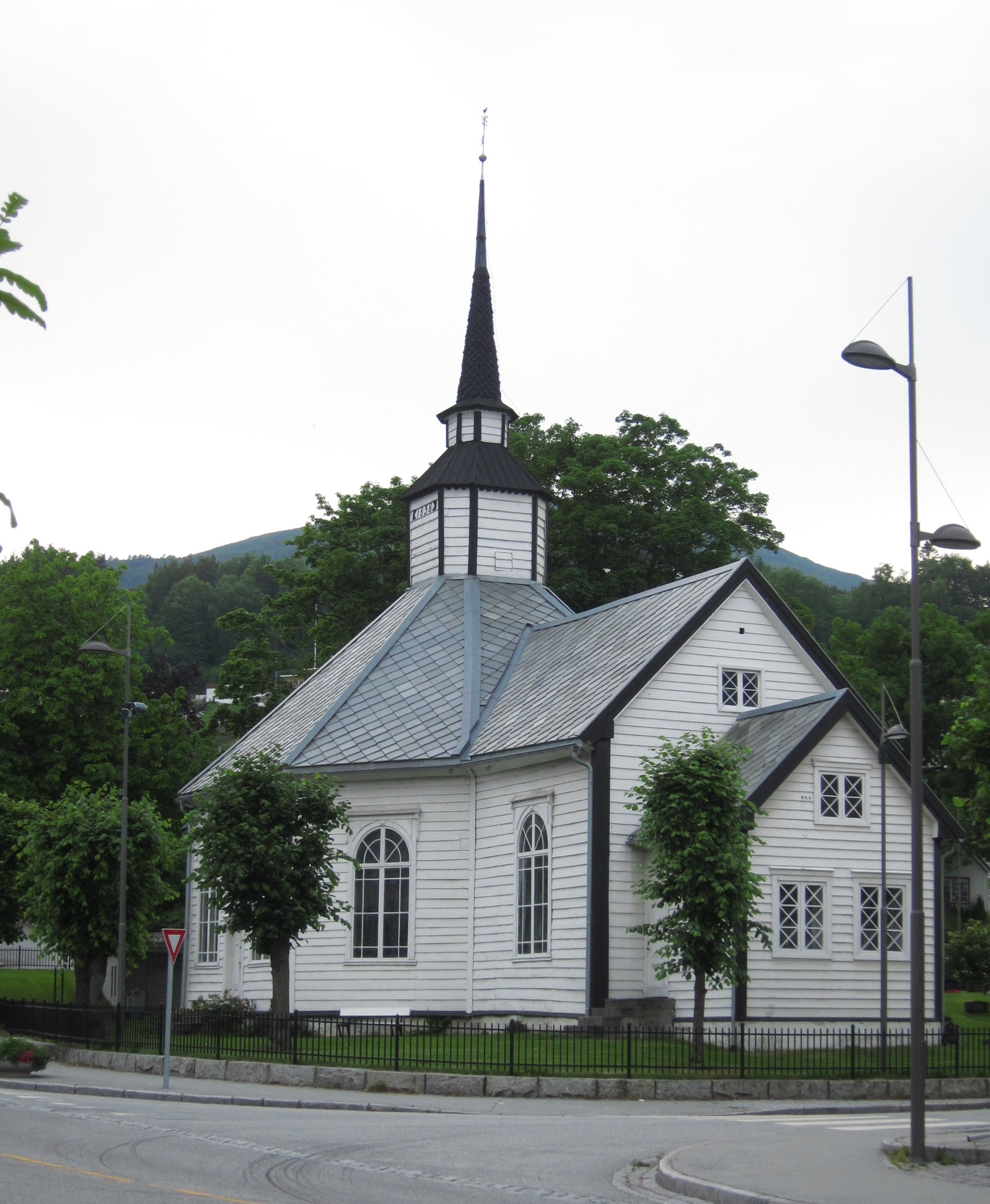

== See also ==
- List of churches in Møre
