= Magdalene Thoresen =

Danish-Norwegian poet and playwright (1819–1903)

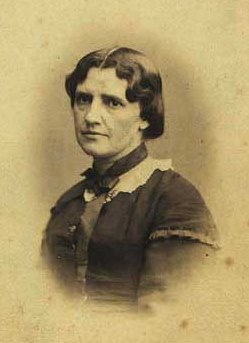
- Born: Anna Magdalene Kragh; 3 June 1819; Fredericia, Denmark
- Died: 28 March 1903 (aged 83); Copenhagen, Denmark
- Occupations: poet, novelist, short story writer and playwright

Anna Magdalene Thoresen, née Kragh (3 June 1819 – 28 March 1903) was a Danish-Norwegian poet, novelist, short story writer and playwright. She is said to have inspired a number of other writers to model characters after her. Her stepdaughter, Suzannah Ibsen, was married to Henrik Ibsen. A selection of her letters has been published as Breve fra Magdalene Thoresen 1855-1901 (Memoirer og Breve, 1919). After the death of her Norwegian husband, she moved back to Denmark.

== Personal life ==
She was born Anna Magdalene Kragh in Fredericia, Denmark, the daughter of skipper Thomas Nielsen Kragh and Anna Kristine Pedersen. She gave birth to an illegitimate child, who was put out to nurse. She then moved to Norway in 1842 and became governess for dean Hans Conrad Thoresen (1802–1858) who lived in Herøy Municipality in Sunnmøre. He was a widower and had five children, and she married him in 1843. From 1844 they lived in Bergen, where she played a central role in the cultural life. Her stepdaughter, Suzannah Ibsen, was married to Henrik Ibsen. She had four children with Hans Conrad Thoresen. After her husband's death in 1858, she travelled to Copenhagen in 1861, moved to Christiania in 1866, and lived in Copenhagen from 1870. She died in Copenhagen in 1903.

== Career ==
In Bergen the Thoresens' home became a meeting place for writers and actors. In 1850 Ole Bull established a theatre in Bergen, called Det Norske Theater. Thoresen wrote four plays that were staged anonymously at Det Norske Theater. Through the theatre she became acquainted with playwright Henrik Ibsen. She was a friend of Bjørnstjerne Bjørnson, who published her poetry collection Digte af en dame in 1860. Among her novels are Studenten, published in the collection Fortællinger in 1862, Signes Historie from 1864, Min Bedstemoders Fortælling from 1867, and Solen i Siljedalen from 1868. Among her successful plays are Et rigt Parti, which was first staged at the Royal Danish Theatre in 1870 and later in Stockholm and in Christiania, and Inden Døre from 1877. She published the travel book Billeder fra Vestkysten av Norge in 1872, and another travel book, Billeder fra Midnatsolens Land, in 1882.

== Influence ==
Thoresen's personality became a model for several female characters in Norwegian literature, including Ibsen's "Rebekka West" (from Rosmersholm) and "Ellida Wangel" (from The Lady from the Sea), and Bjørnson's "Maria Stuart" (from his 1864 play), the wild girl "Petra" from Fiskerjenten and "Leonarda" (from his 1879 play).
