= Einar Skavlan =

Norwegian journalist and theatre director

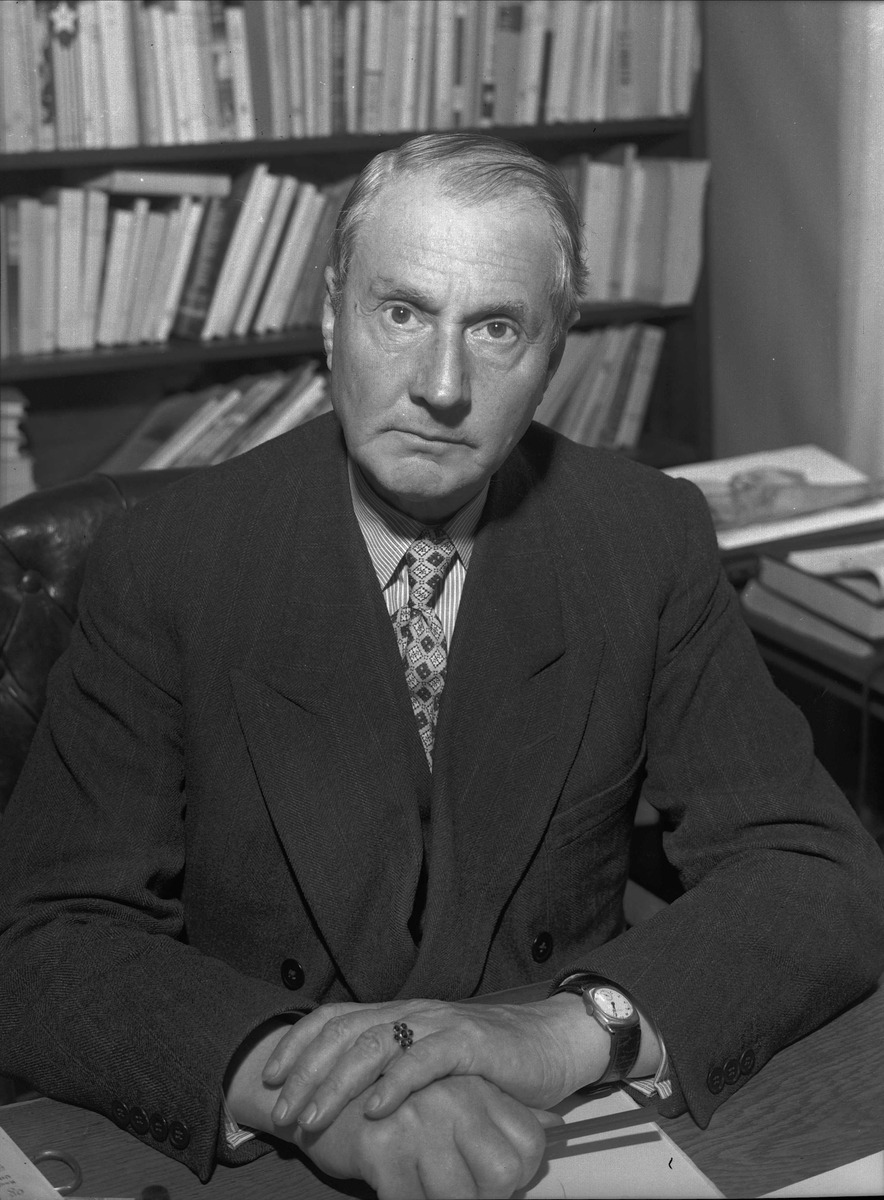
Einar Skavlan.

Einar Kielland Skavlan (30 July 1882 – 16 August 1954) was a Norwegian journalist, newspaper editor, theatre critic and theatre director.

== Biography ==
Skavlan was born in Frogn. His father, Olaf Skavlan, was writer, literary historian and professor. He was also father of actress and theatre director Merete Skavlan.

Skavlan was a journalist for Verdens Gang from 1907, and for Tidens Tegn from 1910. He was editor-in-chief for Dagbladet from 1915 to 1954, except for his period as director for the National Theatre from 1928 to 1930.

He was a member of the Norwegian Association for Women's Rights, where his father had been a member of the first board of directors.

From 1 April 1942 to 19 October 1943 while he was serving as the editor-in-chief of Dagbladet he was imprisoned in Grini concentration camp.

Cultural offices
| Preceded by Bjørn Bjørnson | Director of the National Theatre; 1928–1930 | Succeeded by Halfdan Christensen |
