= Harald Skavlan =

Norwegian railroad engineer

Harald Skavlan (19 June 1854 – 11 July 1908) was a Norwegian railroad engineer.

He was born in Herøy Municipality as a son of dean Aage Schavland (1806–1876) and his wife Gerhardine Pauline Bergh (1817–1884). He was a great-grandnephew of vicar Jacob Schavland, nephew of vicar Gerhard B. Bergh and a brother of Sigvald Skavlan, Einar Skavlan, Sr., Olaf Skavlan and Aage Skavlan.

He grew up in Trondhjem, and from 1870 to 1872 he took an engineer's education in Gothenburg. From 1876 to 1882 he worked as an engineering assistant on the Røros Line, and in the 1890s he participated in the construction of the Hamar–Otta Line and the Gjøvik Line. In 1898 he succeeded Thorbjørn Lekve as head engineer of the western part of the Bergen Line, which was under construction. The construction reached Krøderen before Skavlan's death. The opening of the entire Bergen Line took place in November 1909.

Skavlan advocated a type of countercyclical economy, stating that the state should take particular care of hiring railroad workers and building railroads in downturn periods, as to prevent unemployment. However, he also proposed to cut red tape in administration, and that technical specialists be given more leeway. He was also a proponent of railroad electrification. He died in July 1908 in Voss Municipality.
