= Dag Sjøberg =

- Born: 24 January 1961 (age 65)
- Education: University of Oslo; University of Glasgow
- Scientific career
- Fields: Computer science, software engineering

Dag I.K. Sjøberg (born 24 January 1961) is a Norwegian computer scientist, software engineer, and politician. He is a professor of software engineering at the Department of Informatics at the University of Oslo. From 2001 to 2008, he was Research Director at Simula Research Laboratory and headed the Department of Software Engineering.

== Life ==
Sjøberg took his master's degree in Computer Science (cand.scient.) at the University of Oslo in 1987, and a doctorate (PhD) in Computing Science at the University of Glasgow in 1993.

In 1999, Sjøberg established the research group Industrial System Development (ISU) at the Department of Informatics at the University of Oslo. In 2002 Sjøberg was awarded The Simula Researcher of the Year Award by Managing Director Aslak Tveito. Sjøberg has also been Deputy Chair of the Urban Development, Environment and Transport Committee for The Green Party in Nordstrand since 2016.

From 2019 to 2023, he will serve as deputy chair of the urban development, environment, and transportation committee.

== Publications ==
- D.I.K. Sjøberg, A. Johnsen and J. Solberg. Quantifying the Effect of Using Kanban versus Scrum: A Case Study. IEEE Software, 29(5):47-53, September/October 2012.
- D.I.K. Sjøberg. Confronting the Myth of Rapid Obsolescence in Computing Research, Contributed Article, Communications of the ACM 53(9):62-67, 2010.
- B.C.D. Anda, D.I.K. Sjøberg and A. Mockus. Variability and Reproducibility in Software Engineering: A Study of four Companies that Developed the same System, IEEE Transactions on Software Engineering 35(3):407-429, 2009.
- D.I.K. Sjøberg, T. Dybå and M. Jørgensen. The Future of Empirical Methods in Software Engineering Research, In: Future of Software Engineering (FOSE '07), side 358-378, IEEE-CS Press, 2007.
- E. Arisholm, H.E. Gallis, T. Dybå and D.I.K. Sjøberg. Evaluating Pair Programming with Respect to System Complexity and Programmer Expertise, IEEE Transactions on Software Engineering 33(2):65-86, 2007.
- D.I.K. Sjøberg, J.E. Hannay, O. Hansen, V.B. Kampenes, A. Karahasanovic, N.K. Liborg and A.C. Rekdal. A Survey of Controlled Experiments in Software Engineering, IEEE Transactions on Software Engineering 31(9):733-753, 2005.
