= Marie Rognes =

Norwegian mathematician

Marie Elisabeth Rognes (born 7 October 1982) is a Norwegian applied mathematician specializing in scientific computing and numerical methods for partial differential equations. She works at the Simula Research Laboratory, as one of their chief research scientists.

== Education and career ==
Rognes was a student in applied mathematics at the University of Oslo, earning a master's degree in 2005 and completing a Ph.D. in 2009. Her dissertation, Mixed finite element methods with applications to viscoelasticity and gels, was jointly supervised by Ragnar Winther and Hans Petter Langtangen.

After postdoctoral research at the University of Minnesota and the Simula Research Laboratory, she joined the University of Oslo as a lecturer in 2012, and in the same year became a senior researcher for Simula Research. She remained affiliated on a part-time basis with the University of Oslo until 2016, when she became a chief research scientist for Simula Research.

== Recognition ==
Rognes became one of 20 founding members of the Young Academy of Norway in 2015. In the same year she was part of a team that won the J. H. Wilkinson Prize for Numerical Software, given every four years at the International Congress on Industrial and Applied Mathematics. The award cited their work on dolfin-adjoint, a software package for adjoint and tangent linear equations.

In 2018 she was the winner of the Royal Norwegian Society of Sciences and Letters Prize for Young Researchers in the Natural Sciences.
