= Keno Fischer =

German computer scientist

- Born: Germany
- Education: Harvard
- Known for: Julia (programming language), and projects including Celeste, and exaflops project to remediate nuclear waste
- Awards: Individual: Forbes 2019 30 Under 30 – Enterprise Technology; For collaboration with others: 2017 HPC Innovation Excellence Award
- Scientific career
- Fields: Computer science, Mathematics
- Website: https://github.com/Keno

Keno Fischer is a German computer scientist known for being a core member implementing the Julia programming language in Windows. He is an alumnus of Harvard for both his BA and MA. He works at Julia Computing, which he co-founded with Julia co-creators, Alan Edelman, Jeff Bezanson, Stefan Karpinski, Viral B. Shah and Deepak Vinchhi. He received a B.A. in mathematics and physics from Harvard in 2016, and he completed a Master of Arts in Physics also from Harvard in 2016.

At the age of 25, Fischer was selected by Forbes for their 2019 30 Under 30 – Enterprise Technology list for his work with Julia Computing company.

Fischer, along with the rest of the Celeste team, was awarded the 2017 HPC Innovation Excellence Award for "the outstanding application of HPC for business and scientific achievements." The Celeste project, that ran on a top 6 supercomputer "created the first comprehensive catalog of visible objects in our universe by processing 178 terabytes of SDSS (Sloan Digital Sky Survey) data". "Collecting all known data about the visible universe into a meaningful model certainly is a big data problem."

Fischer is one of the computer exascale simulation researchers helping to remediate nuclear waste, in a collaboration including e.g. Brown University, Nvidia, Lawrence Berkeley National Laboratory with "a deep learning application [..] focused on the Hanford Site, established in 1943 as part of the Manhattan Project to produce plutonium for nuclear weapons and eventually home to the first full-scale plutonium production reactor in the world [..] When plutonium production ended in 1989, left behind were tens of millions of gallons of radioactive and chemical waste in large underground tanks and more than 100 square miles of contaminated groundwater [..] the team was able to achieve 1.2 exaflop peak and sustained performance – the first example of a large-scale GAN architecture applied to SPDEs." "They trained the GAN on the Summit supercomputer, which (as of the June 2019 Top500 list) remains the world’s fastest publicly-ranked supercomputer at 148.6 Linpack petaflops. The team achieved peak and sustained performance of 1.2 exaflops, scaling to 27,504 of Summit’s Nvidia V100 GPUs and 4,584 of its nodes. [..] This physics-informed GAN, trained by HPC, allowed the researchers to quantify their uncertainties about the subsurface flow in the site." The site is "one of the most contaminated sites in the western hemisphere".

Fischer is also the lead programmer of several projects using the Julia language, such as Cxx.jl and XLA.jl (to support Google's TPUs). He also works on supporting the Julia language on WebAssembly. In H1 2019, Mozilla, the maker of the Firefox web browser, sponsored "a member of the official Julia team" for the project "Bringing Julia to the Browser" as part of their research grants. Additionally, Fischer has worked on Mozilla's rr tool.

== See also ==
- Timeline of programming languages
- Julia programming language
