= Viral B. Shah =

Indian computer scientist

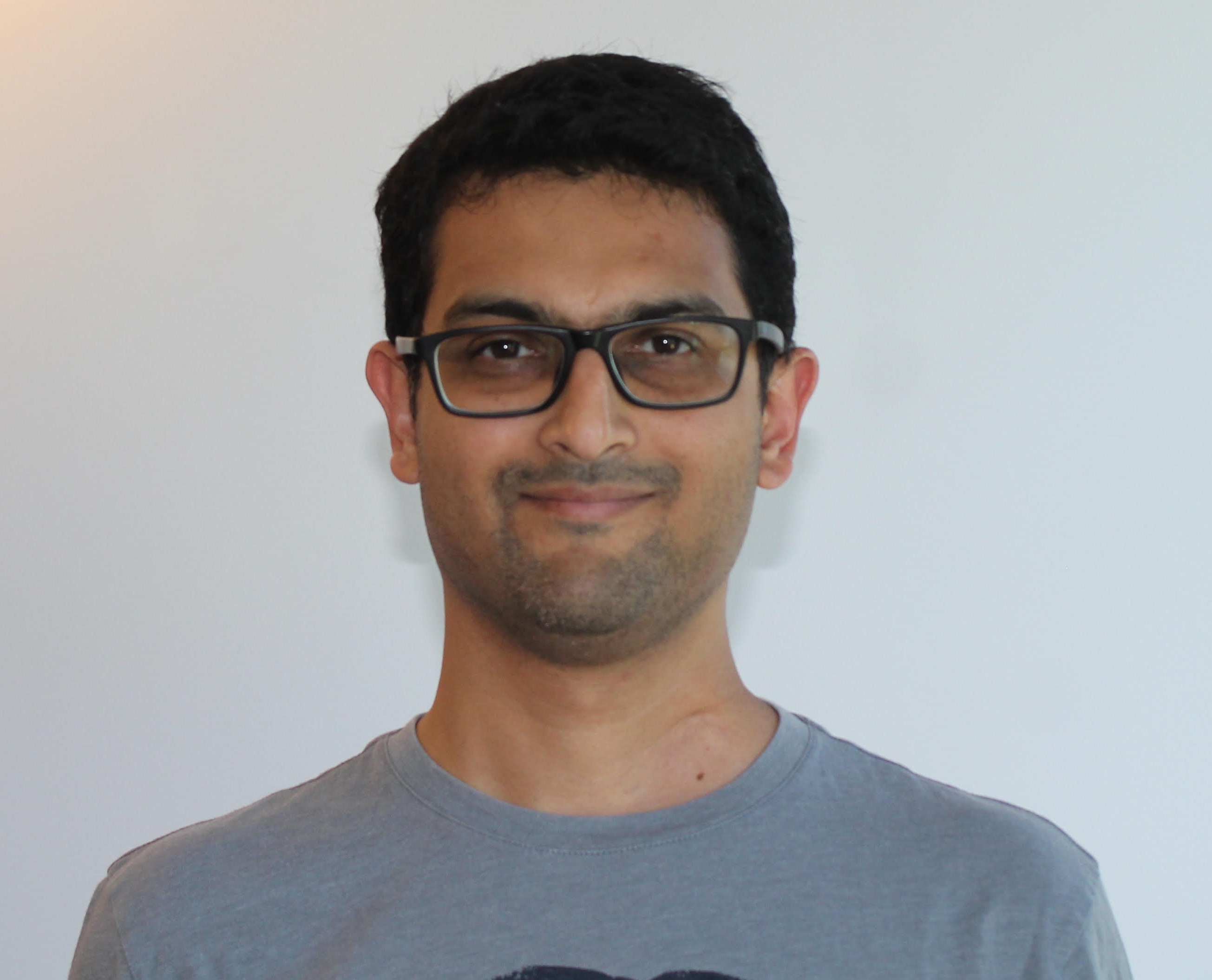
- Born: Mumbai, India
- Education: UC Santa Barbara; PVPP COE
- Known for: Julia (programming language); Circuitscape; Rebooting India
- Awards: J. H. Wilkinson Prize for Numerical Software (2019)
- Scientific career
- Fields: Computer science; Computational science
- Thesis: An Interactive System for Combinatorial Scientific Computing with an Emphasis on Programmer Productivity (2007)
- Doctoral advisor: John R. Gilbert
- Website: Viral B. Shah on X

Viral B Shah (Hindi: वीरल बी. शाह) is an Indian computer scientist, best known for being a co-creator of the Julia programming language. He was also actively involved in the initial design of the Aadhaar project in India which provides a 12-digit unique identity number to each Indian resident based on their biometric and demographic data. Based on his experiences implementing Aadhaar and other complex technology projects in government, he co-authored the book Rebooting India with Nandan Nilekani.

Shah is currently the CEO of JuliaHub (former company name Julia Computing), which he co-founded as Julia Computing with Julia co-creators, Jeff Bezanson, Alan Edelman, Stefan Karpinski as well as Keno Fischer and Deepak Vinchhi. In July 2021, Julia Computing raised $24 Million in Series A round led by Dorilton Ventures, with participation from Menlo Ventures, General Catalyst, and HighSage Ventures.

== Awards ==
- In 2013, Shah received The Spatial Ecology and Telemetry Working Group (SETWG) award for co-creating Circuitscape with Brad McRae.
- In 2019, Shah was awarded the J. H. Wilkinson Prize for Numerical Software with Jeff Bezanson and Stefan Karpinski for their work on the Julia programming language.
