= Tore Dybå =

Norwegian scientist and software engineer

Tore Dybå (born 31 July 1961) is a Norwegian scientist and software engineer in the fields of information systems and computer science. He has been a Chief Scientist at SINTEF ICT since 2003.

== Career ==
Dybå received his Master of Science in Electrical Engineering and Computer Science from the Norwegian Institute of Technology in 1987. In 2001 he received his Doctoral degree (PhD) in Computer and Information Science from the Norwegian University of Science and Technology.

He worked as a software engineer and consultant in Norway and Saudi Arabia from 1987 until 1994 when he moved to SINTEF. Dybå had an adjunct position at the Simula Research Laboratory from 2002 to 2009, and from 2010 until 2015 he was a Professor of Software Engineering at the Department of Informatics at the University of Oslo.

== Research ==
Dybå's research is related to organizational and socio-technical aspects of software development and how software development can be improved. He has been particularly concerned with combining rigorous research with topics of importance to the software industry, including software process improvement, agile software development and management, and empirical methods for software engineering.

== Awards ==
For the period 2001–2012, the Journal of Systems and Software ranked Dybå as the top scholar worldwide in agile software development. The ranking named Dybå as the most active researchers by total articles in the period as well as the most cited researcher by total number of citations and adjusted citations.

In 2014 Dybå, together with Barbara Kitchenham and Magne Jørgensen, received the Association for Computing Machinery's ACM SIGSOFT award for the most influential paper in the last ten years for the initial paper on evidence-based software engineering.

Dybå et al.’s article on evidence-based software engineering for practitioners was chosen by the editorial and advisory boards of IEEE Software as one of the magazine's 25th anniversary top picks of recommended reading.

== Selected works ==
- T. Dybå, T. Dingsøyr and N.B. Moe. Agile Project Management, in G. Ruhe and C. Wohlin (Eds.) Software Project Management in a Changing World, Berlin: Springer Verlag, pp. 277–300, 2014.
- T. Dybå and T. Dingsøyr. Empirical Studies of Agile Software Development: A Systematic Review, Information and Software Technology, 50(9–10): 833–859, 2008.
- D. I. K. Sjøberg, T. Dybå and M. Jørgensen. The Future of Empirical Methods in Software Engineering Research, Future of Software Engineering (FOSE 2007), IEEE-CS Press, pp. 358–378, 2007.
- E. Arisholm, H.E. Gallis, T. Dybå and D.I.K. Sjøberg. Evaluating Pair Programming with Respect to System Complexity and Programmer Expertise, IEEE Transactions on Software Engineering 33(2):65-86, 2007.
- T. Dybå. An Empirical Investigation of the Key Factors for Success in Software Process Improvement, IEEE Transactions on Software Engineering, 31(5): 410–424, 2005.
- T. Dybå, B. Kitchenham and M. Jørgensen. Evidence-based Software Engineering for Practitioners, IEEE Software, 22(1): 58–65, 2005.
- B. Kitchenham, T. Dybå and M. Jørgensen. Evidence-based Software Engineering, International Conference on Software Engineering (ICSE 2004), IEEE Computer Society, pp. 273–281, 2004.
- T. Dybå. Improvisation in Small Software Organizations, IEEE Software, 17(5): 82–87, 2000.
