= Sheffield Software Engineering Observatory =

The Sheffield Software Engineering Observatory (Observatory) was founded in 2005 by an EPSRC grant at the University of Sheffield. The Observatory is a multi-disciplinary collaboration between the Department of Computer Science and the Institute of Work Psychology at the University of Sheffield.

== Overview ==
Its aim is to understand the processes that makes for good software engineering practice, and how are these needs to combine human and technical factors.

The Software Engineering Observatory is an empirical software engineering research facility where researchers can use a variety of methodologies to study software developers working on real industrial projects. The software developers are students, both undergraduate and postgraduate and up to 20 group projects were undertaken each year. Thus, researchers can investigate how software developers work in teams, deal with industrial clients and handle the plethora of problems that arise in group projects with tight time-scales. A key feature is that the Observatory allows multiple teams to work on identical projects concurrently in competition with each other, which allows comparisons to be made of different software development processes. The Observatory enables researchers to gather data that are relevant to many of the key issues in contemporary software engineering, which will be of interest to both academics and practitioners. The implications of the results so far are that effective software managers must not just understand the technical aspects of the work that their staff are doing, but must also understand their staff as individuals and how they can best work together in teams.

== Research areas ==
The Observatory’s research agenda includes:

1. Assessing, through controlled experiments, the relative merits of software development methods and methodologies in terms of both the quality of output and the well-being of the developers.
2. Devising empirically-based models of the processes that developers are observed to use
3. Identifying the factors that make for good team-based software development, including leadership, the personality, skill, gender and ethnic mix of teams, and how task conflict can contribute, constructively, to enhanced performance.
4. Investigating the relative importance of (a) the methodology adopted by the team and degree of fidelity to it, (b) the individual’s participant’s motivation and knowledge, and (c) team processes in accounting for variability in the performance of the group.

The data from these experiments will be made available to bona-fide researchers in empirical software engineering.

== History ==
The Observatory was founded in 2005, however prior to that a number of PhD students designed experiments and collected data on the software engineering process. These were all based on the pioneering taught courses devised at the University of Sheffield

Date	Event
1985	The department of computer science at the University of Sheffield starts to focus resources on industrially orientated opportunities.
1985	The "Software Hut" project was initially introduced after reforms inspired by the then head of department Doug Lewin. In the first few years the projects were sourced in the department and the course having a more theoretical perspective than now, with later reforms seeking external clients.
1988	Maxi project established for the MSc program by Stan Price. This project was from the start led by a non-academic manager. As with the Software Hut the students work in teams to deliver a solution to an external client.
1998	The main project parts of the crossover project are introduced into two modules as part of the new Software Engineering degree programme.
1991	The first year Crossover project was established in its current form by Mike Holcombe. It was formed originally by combining elements from two other modules, though the modern form may not have been settled upon until 1993. This internal project teaches theory of software development alongside a practical project. It follows the form of a handover project.
1994 (est)	Peter Croll established the Software Hut in its current form with external clients, and a focus on learning through practice. Software Hut is run in the first semester of level 2 for 12 weeks. Marks are allocated 60% on the project and 40% on an exam. The project was envisaged as student numbers began to grow in computer science departments, such that it became difficult to find enough industrial placements or projects for individual students. This led to the idea of a group of students working with a single client and later to several groups competing to produce a solution. At this time it appears that a single client was sought to work with all the teams. It follows principles of having a competitive development environment that were previously discussed in the 1970s but without the handover requirement.
1995	Crossover project reorganized to fill a full half module.
1996	Andy Stratton works as a project officer on an FDTL grant to develop the Software Hut, and latter found the 4th year Genesys project.
1996 September	First group of undergraduate students reach the fourth year (the Software Engineering MEng having had its first intake three years previously in 1993), they were supposed to follow a module similar to the maxi project but this never actually occurred.
1997	Software Hut. The project experiences significant requirements creep, and only 2 of 12 teams deliver working software. It was probably our largest ever failure to deliver.
1997 September	Genesys founded as VICI. Genesys ran during the second year of the MEng with 6 students: Daniel Khan, Grant Bardsley, Daniel East, Paul Todd, Simon Cadd and Adam Howitt. The module was original called "Setting up and running your own IT Company". Initially there were actually three companies Training, Development, and Consultancy. Where each student at some point played the role of chairman and finance director. In later years this structure was dropped to form a single company consisting of several development teams.
1998	Software Hut revised. Software Hut is run in the second semester of level 2 for 12 weeks. This makes it harder to recruit clients who previously had been found three months before the start of the project, now Christmas gets in the way giving only 5 weeks lead time before the start of the project. In this year there were for the first time several clients working with the teams. Typically three clients would be found in each year, with 3-6 teams working with each client. This became essential as the number of students grew on the course. Following the previous years failures all the teams are expected to deliver a requirements document in week 6. This remained a component of the project until 2007. Students had the option of 100% mark for the project work, or 40% exam 60% project.
1998	Helen Parker works as project officer until 2000, taking over from Andy Stratton.
1998 September	Genesys named by two MSc students who completed projects over the summer period. One student was Paul Lyons, the other Tariq Hussain. Both produced dissertations entitled "Genesys Solutions: A Quality-Oriented Software Development and Consultancy Company"
1999	Software Hut revised. Marks were now allocated 100% for the project for all students.
2001	Initial work begins to build the proposal for the Observatory.
2001	Genesys. In this year there were for the first time non-development teams. These were “Research and Development” and “Systems admin”. Until this year these roles had been performed by members of the development teams in an ad hoc manner. The system admin role remains in Genesys but the R&D role was later dropped.
2002	Student numbers begin to decline on Computer Science courses nationally. This has an effect on the number of teams (which peaked at 18 in 1998) which begin to decline significantly.
2003	Genesys awarded IBM Eclipse (software) innovation grant. This IBM sponsored initiative led to the formation of an “Eclipse Team” which developed Eclipse plugins to support the company.
2003 March	Institute of Work Psychology at the University of Sheffield are invited to participate in the research into software engineering.
2004 March	Genesys awarded IBM Eclipse (software) innovation grant. This IBM sponsored initiative led to the formation of an “Eclipse Team” which developed Eclipse plugins to support the company.
2004 August	Francisco Macias completes his PhD with M. Holcombe. “Empirical Assessment of Extreme Programming”
2004 September	A marketing team is established in Genesys.
2005	Stephen Wood joins the Observatory team, working in the Institute of Work Psychology at the University of Sheffield.
2005 March	Genesys awarded second IBM Eclipse (software) innovation grant. The grant was used to employ Bhavnidhi Kalra as a project manager for 6 months.
2005 April	Sharifah Syed-Abdullah completes her PhD with M Holcombe: “Empirical Study on Extreme Programming”.
2005 September	EPSRC Grant awarded: £500K over three years to carry out research in the Observatory.
2005 September	Genesys. The research and development team was dropped and an “Enterprise Team” formed to try to build generic applications for resale. The students did not find this motivating and the team only existed in this year.
2006 March	George Michaelides, John Karn and Chris Thomson appointed as RAs.
2006 July	John Karn completes his PhD working with Tony Cowling: “Empirical Software Engineering: Developing Behaviour and Preferences”.
2006 September	Genesys, with no Eclipse (software) grant this year, the “Eclipse” team is dropped.
2006 October	Joint EPSRC-ESRC trial studentship awarded, to fund a new UK PhD student over three years in the Observatory.
2006 November	Phil McMinn appointed as lecturer in Enterprise computing, joins the Observatory staff in teaching Genesys. Steven Murphy appointed as Genesys business manager, to grow Genesys into a larger company.
2007	In this year the smallest group passed through Software Hut, there were 9 teams, and 40 students overall. For the first time in 10 years, with the XP process in use the students are not required to submit a requirements document.
2007 February	Chris Thomson completes his PhD with Mike Holcombe: “Defining and Describing Change Events in Software Development Projects”.
2007 September	Liang Huang completes a Masters Thesis with Mike Holcombe:"Analysis and quantification of test first programming".
2007 October	epiGenesys is registered as a limited company and spun out of the University. Students projects continue in Genesys which mostly takes projects under outsourcing agreements via epiGenesys. Steve Murphy is transferred to the company and Chris Murray is also employed. Future research may involve tapping into the data created by software development at epiGenesys as the University of Sheffield is the sole shareholder.
2007 October	Andrea Corbett née Smith is appointed as the EPSRC-ESRC PhD student, Mike Holcombe and Stephen Wood are join supervisors.
2008 May	Steve Murphy leaves epiGenesys.
2009 May	Chris Murray is appointed Managing Director of epiGenesys. The company continues to offer bespoke software development and now specialises in the delivery of information systems for the medical and health research sectors, but retains a passion for enterprise education through which it enhances the learning experience of more than 250 students each year.
