= J. H. Wilkinson Prize for Numerical Software =

James H. Wilkinson Prize for Numerical Software
- Description: Award honoring outstanding contributions in the field of numerical software
- Country: United States
- Presented by: Society for Industrial and Applied Mathematics (SIAM)
- Website: https://www.siam.org/Prizes-Recognition/Major-Prizes-Lectures/Detail/james-h-wilkinson-prize-for-numerical-software

The James H. Wilkinson Prize for Numerical Software is awarded every four years to honor outstanding contributions in the field of numerical software. The award is named to commemorate the outstanding contributions of James H. Wilkinson in the same field.

== History and administration ==
The prize was established by Argonne National Laboratory (ANL), the National Physical Laboratory (NPL), and the Numerical Algorithms Group (NAG). They sponsored the award every four years at the International Congress on Industrial and Applied Mathematics (ICIAM) beginning with the 1991 award. By agreement in 2015 among ANL, NPL, NAG, and SIAM, the prize will be administered by the Society for Industrial and Applied Mathematics (SIAM) starting with the 2019 award.

== Eligibility and selection criteria ==
Candidates must have worked in the field for at most 12 years after receiving their PhD as of January 1 of the award year. Breaks in continuity are allowed, and the prize committee may make exceptions. The award is given on the basis of:

- Clarity of the software implementation and documentation.
- Clarity of the paper accompanying the entry.
- Portability, reliability, efficiency and usability of the software implementation.
- Depth of analysis of the algorithm and the software.
- Importance of application addressed by the software.
- Quality of the test software

== Winners ==
=== 1991 ===
The first prize in 1991 was awarded to Linda Petzold for DASSL, a differential algebraic equation solver. This code is available in the public domain.

=== 1995 ===
The 1995 prize was awarded to Chris Bischof and Alan Carle for ADIFOR 2.0, an automatic differentiation tool for Fortran 77 programs. The code is available for educational and non-profit research.

=== 1999 ===
The 1999 prize was awarded to Matteo Frigo and Steven G. Johnson for FFTW, a C library for computing the discrete Fourier transform.

=== 2003 ===
The 2003 prize was awarded to Jonathan Shewchuk for Triangle, a two-dimensional mesh generator and Delaunay Triangulator. It is freely available.

=== 2007 ===
The 2007 prize was awarded to Wolfgang Bangerth, Guido Kanschat, and Ralf Hartmann for deal.II, a software library for computational solution of partial differential equations using adaptive finite elements. It is freely available.

=== 2011 ===
Andreas Waechter (IBM T. J. Watson Research Center) and Carl Laird (Texas A&M University) were awarded the 2011 prize for IPOPT, an object-oriented library for solving large-scale continuous optimization problems. It is freely available.

=== 2015 ===
The 2015 prize was awarded to Patrick Farrell (University of Oxford), Simon Funke (Simula Research Laboratory), David Ham (Imperial College London), and Marie Rognes (Simula Research Laboratory) for the development of dolfin-adjoint, a package which automatically derives and solves adjoint and tangent linear equations from high-level mathematical specifications of finite element discretisations of partial differential equations.

=== 2019 ===
The 2019 prize was awarded to Jeff Bezanson, Stefan Karpinski, and Viral B. Shah for their development of the Julia programming language.

=== 2023 ===
The 2023 prize was awarded to Field Van Zee and Devin Matthews for the development of BLIS, a portable open-source software framework for instantiating high-performance BLAS-like dense linear algebra libraries on modern CPUs.

== See also ==
- List of computer science awards
- List of mathematics awards
