= Stefan Karpinski =

American computer scientist

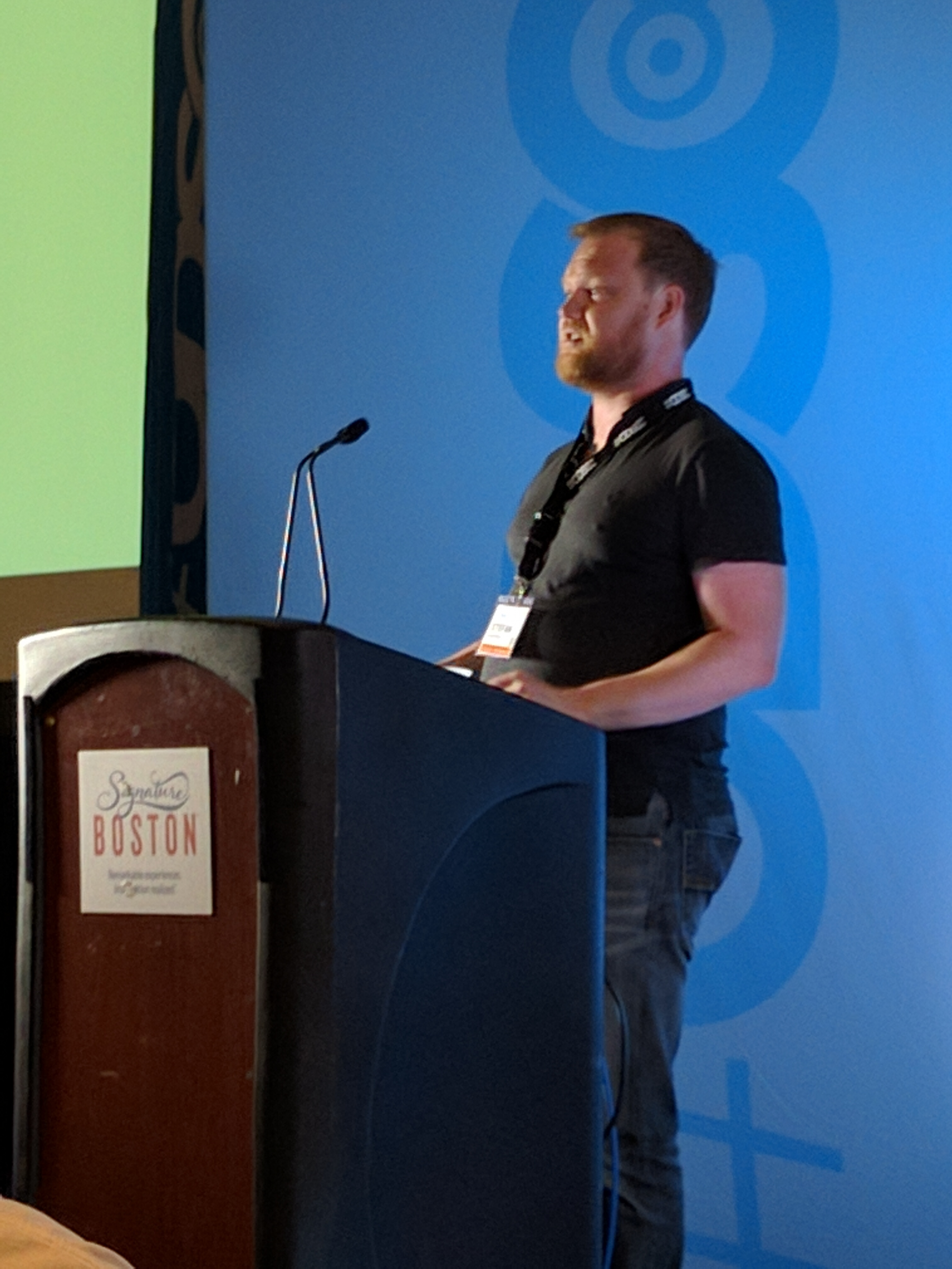
- Karpinski in 2016
- Education: Harvard University (AB); University of California, Santa Barbara (PhD)
- Known for: Julia (programming language)
- Scientific career
- Fields: Computer science, Mathematics
- Workplaces: NYU
- Website: http://karpinski.org/

Stefan Karpinski is an American computer scientist known for being a co-creator of the Julia programming language. He is an alumnus of Harvard and works at Julia Computing, which he co-founded with Julia co-creators, Alan Edelman, Jeff Bezanson, Viral B. Shah as well as Keno Fischer and Deepak Vinchhi.

He received a B.A. in mathematics from Harvard in 2000, and has completed much of the work on a PhD in computer science from UCSB with research on modeling local area network traffic. He is one of the four main authors of core academic papers on Julia. He speaks regularly on Julia at industry events on scientific computing, programming languages, and data science.

In 2006, Karpinski participated in the Subway Challenge, holding for some time the Guinness World Record for the fastest transit stopping at all New York City Subway stations.

== Awards ==
In 2019, Stefan Karpinski was awarded the J. H. Wilkinson Prize for Numerical Software with Jeff Bezanson and Viral B. Shah for their work on the Julia programming language.

== See also ==
- Timeline of programming languages
- Julia programming language
- Jeff Bezanson
- Alan Edelman
- Keno Fischer
- Viral B. Shah
