= Per-Olof Persson =

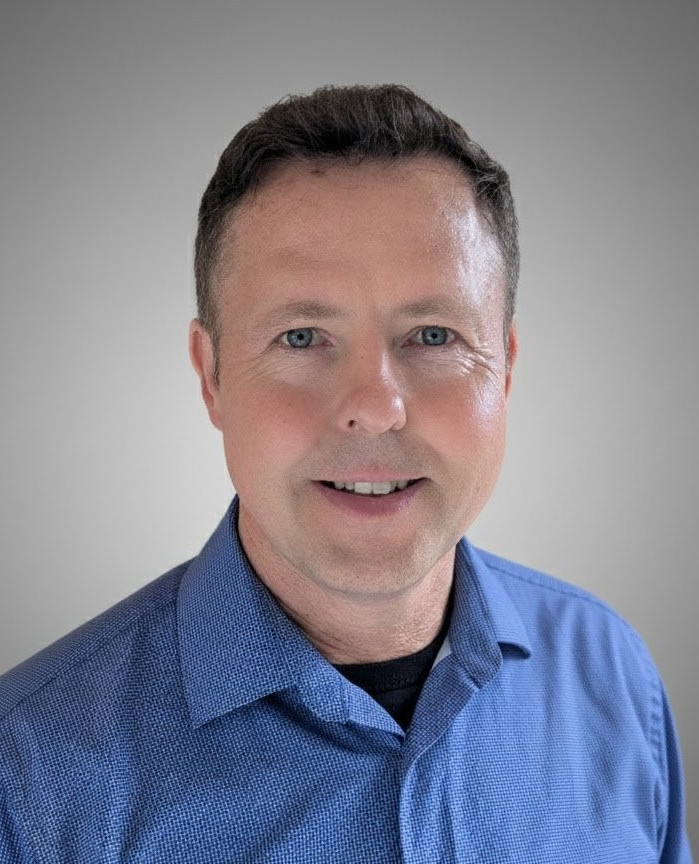
- Education: Lund Institute of Technology; Massachusetts Institute of Technology
- Known for: DistMesh algorithm
- Scientific career
- Fields: Applied mathematics Computational mathematics Numerical analysis Computational fluid dynamics Mesh generation
- Workplaces: University of California, Berkeley; Berkeley Lab; Massachusetts Institute of Technology; COMSOL
- Thesis: Mesh Generation for Implicit Geometries (2005)
- Doctoral advisor: Alan Edelman, Gilbert Strang
- Website: persson.berkeley.edu

Per-Olof Persson is a Swedish-American professor of applied mathematics at University of California, Berkeley, and a mathematician faculty senior scientist at the Lawrence Berkeley National Laboratory. His research focuses include numerical methods for partial differential equations, high-order accurate methods, and unstructured mesh generation.

== Education and career ==
Persson holds a Master of Science in engineering physics from Lund University and completed his Ph.D. in applied mathematics at the Massachusetts Institute of Technology (MIT) in 2005.

Following his doctorate, he served as a postdoctoral associate, an instructor of applied mathematics, and a visiting assistant professor of aeronautics and astronautics at MIT.

Prior to his academic career, he spent several years developing commercial numerical software for the finite element package COMSOL Multiphysics

In 2010, Persson was one of 38 people that were awarded $14 Million for the Air Force Young Investigators Research Program for submitting research proposals that "show exceptional ability and promise for conducting basic research."

In February 2011, Persson was awarded with the Sloan Research Fellowship for $50,000 to pursue further research at UC Berkeley.

== Research and publications ==
=== Research ===
Persson's research focuses on computational fluid and solid mechanics, with an emphasis on high-order discontinuous Galerkin (DG) methods and unstructured mesh generation. In the area of mesh generation, building upon the development of the DistMesh algorithm, his work extends to space-time and curved meshes. More recently, Persson has introduced machine learning approaches to the field, developing frameworks that utilize deep reinforcement learning and self-play to optimize unstructured triangular and quadrilateral meshes by minimizing irregular nodes.

Persson has developed numerical discretization schemes designed to improve computational scaling at high polynomial degrees, including the Compact DG scheme, the sparse Line-DG method, and half-closed DG methods. To address high computational costs associated with high-order methods, his research includes the development of efficient parallel solvers that utilize static condensation, optimally ordered incomplete factorizations by the Minimum Discarded Fill (MDF) method, and Kronecker-SVD preconditioning techniques.

Persson has also contributed to the development of fully discrete adjoint methods for PDE-constrained optimization, with practical applications such as optimal designs for flapping flight. In collaboration with Matthew Zahr, he developed high-order implicit shock tracking (HOIST) techniques. This approach uses full-space optimization solvers to align curved meshes with flow discontinuities, allowing for the capture of shocks while maintaining high-order convergence. Additionally, his applied research includes implicit-explicit (IMEX) schemes for partitioned fluid-structure interactions and Wall-Resolved Large Eddy Simulation for turbulent flows.

=== Select publications ===
- Narayanan, A.; Pan, Y.; Persson, P.-O. (2024). "Learning topological operations on meshes with application to block decomposition of polygons". Computer-Aided Design. 175: 103744.
- Zahr, M.; Shi, A.; Persson, P.-O. (2020). "Implicit shock tracking using an optimization-based high-order discontinuous Galerkin method". Journal of Computational Physics. 410: 109385.
- Wang, Z. J.; et al. (2013). "High-Order CFD Methods: Current Status and Perspective". International Journal for Numerical Methods in Fluids. 72 (8): 811–845.
- Peraire, J.; Persson, P.-O. (2008). "The Compact Discontinuous Galerkin (CDG) Method for Elliptic Problems". SIAM Journal on Scientific Computing. 30 (4): 1806–1824.
- Persson, P.-O.; Peraire, J. (2006). "Sub-Cell Shock Capturing for Discontinuous Galerkin Methods". Proceedings of the 44th AIAA Aerospace Sciences Meeting and Exhibit. AIAA-2006-112.
- Persson, P.-O.; Strang, G. (2004). "A Simple Mesh Generator in MATLAB". SIAM Review. 46 (2): 329–345.

=== Software ===
- DistMesh: An algorithm for generation of unstructured triangular and tetrahedral meshes.
