= Per Runeson =

- Known for: Empirical methods in software engineering, case study research, software testing
- Scientific career
- Fields: Software engineering, Empirical software engineering, Software testing
- Workplaces: Lund University

Per Runeson is a Swedish computer scientist and Professor of Software Engineering at Lund University, where he leads the Software Engineering Research Group (SERG). His research on empirical methods in software engineering, particularly case study research and software testing, is among the most cited in the field; an independent bibliometric study ranked him fourth among systems and software engineering scholars worldwide for 2003–2007.

== Research ==
Runeson's research focuses on rigorous empirical approaches to studying software development phenomena. Key contributions include:

- Case study methodology – Runeson is the principal author of Case Study Research in Software Engineering: Guidelines and Examples (Wiley, 2012), the standard reference on conducting and reporting case studies in software engineering; the book describes research design, data collection, and analysis strategies adapted from social science to software engineering contexts
- Experimentation – co-author of Experimentation in Software Engineering (Springer, 2012, with Wohlin et al.), a companion volume covering controlled experiments, quasi-experiments, and surveys
- Software testing – research on test-case prioritisation, test selection, and the role of testing in agile and continuous integration environments
- Open science – advocating for open data and open source artefacts in empirical software engineering research

His work has been cited more than 34,000 times according to Google Scholar, reflecting the broad adoption of his methodological frameworks.
