= Marc G. Genton =

Swiss professor

- Born: September 1969 (age 56); Geneva, Switzerland
- Education: Swiss Federal Institute of Technology in Lausanne
- Occupation: Academic / Scientist
- Awards: ACM Gordon Bell in Climate Modeling Award (2024); Don Owen Award (2024); Barnett Award (2023); Georges Matheron Lectureship Award (2020); ISI Service Award (2019); Frank Wilcoxon Prize (2016); El-Shaarawi Award for Excellence from TIES (2010); Distinguished Achievement Award from ENVR-ASA (2010)
- Scientific career
- Fields: Statistical analysis Uncertainty quantification Spatio-temporal data analysis Data Science
- Workplaces: KAUST; Texas A&M University; University of Geneva; North Carolina State University; Massachusetts Institute of Technology
- Doctoral advisors: Stephan Morgenthaler
- Doctoral students: Yanyuan Ma; Amanda Hering; Ying Sun; Jian Cao; Mary Salvana
- Website: stsds.kaust.edu.sa; marcgenton.github.io

Marc G. Genton, (born September 1969 in Geneva, Switzerland) is currently a Distinguished Professor of Statistics with the King Abdullah University of Science and Technology, (KAUST), Thuwal, Saudi Arabia. He is known as a specialist in Spatio-Temporal Statistics, Data Science and their applications in geophysics, climate science, and marine science. The International Association for Mathematical Geosciences awarded him the Georges Matheron Lectureship in 2020. He is a Fellow of the American Statistical Association (2007), Elected member to the International Statistical Institute (2008), Fellow member of the Royal Statistical Society (2009), Fellow of the Institute of Mathematical Statistics (2010), and Fellow of the American Association for the Advancement of Science (2012).

== Education ==
- Ph.D., Statistics, École Polytechnique Fédérale de Lausanne, 1996
- M.Sc., Applied Mathematics Teaching, École Polytechnique Fédérale de Lausanne, 1994
- B.Sc., Engineer in Applied Mathematics, École Polytechnique Fédérale de Lausanne 1992

== See also ==
- International Association for Mathematical Geosciences
