= Linda Petzold =

American mathematician

Linda Ruth Petzold
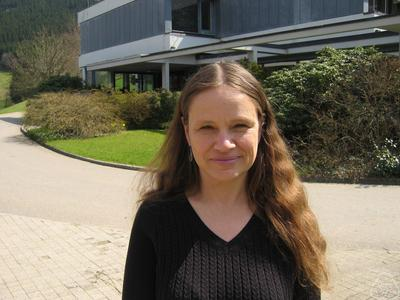
- Linda Petzold at MFO, 2006
- Born: 1954 (age 71–72)
- Education: University of Illinois at Urbana-Champaign
- Awards: J. H. Wilkinson Prize for Numerical Software (1991), ACM Fellow (2011), SIAM/ACM Prize in Computational Science and Engineering (2013)
- Scientific career
- Fields: Computer science, Mechanical engineering
- Workplaces: University of California, Santa Barbara
- Thesis: An Efficient Numerical Method for Highly Oscillatory Ordinary Differential Equations (1978)
- Doctoral advisor: Charles William Gear

Linda Ruth Petzold (born 1954) is a professor of computer science and mechanical engineering at the University of California, Santa Barbara, where she is also listed as affiliated faculty in the department of mathematics. Her research concerns differential algebraic equations and the computer simulation of large real-world social and biological networks.

== Education ==
Petzold did both her undergraduate and graduate studies at the University of Illinois at Urbana–Champaign, earning a bachelor's degree in mathematics and computer science in 1974 and a doctorate in computer science in 1978 under the supervision of C. William Gear.

== Recognition ==
Petzold was the first winner of the J. H. Wilkinson Prize for Numerical Software, for her work on DASSL, a system for the numerical solution of differential algebraic equations. She was also the inaugural Kovalesky Lecturer in 2003, and in 2013 she won the SIAM/ACM Prize in Computational Science and Engineering.

She was elected a member of the National Academy of Engineering in 2004 "for advances in the numerical solution of differential/algebraic equations and their incorporation into widely distributed software." She became a Fellow of the Society for Industrial and Applied Mathematics in 2009 and of the Association for Computing Machinery in 2013; She is also a fellow of the American Society of Mechanical Engineers and of the American Association for the Advancement of Science. She was elected to the National Academy of Sciences in 2021.

In January 2015 she was given an honorary doctorate by Uppsala University.
