= Jonathan Shewchuk =

Canadian computer scientist

- Born: Cranbrook, British Columbia, Canada
- Education: Simon Fraser University (BSc); Carnegie Mellon University (MS, PhD)
- Known for: Triangle mesh-generation software Robust geometric predicates An Introduction to the Conjugate Gradient Method Without the Agonizing Pain
- Awards: J. H. Wilkinson Prize for Numerical Software (2003); Sloan Research Fellowship (2004); Computational Geometry Test-of-Time Award (2012)
- Scientific career
- Fields: Computer science, computational geometry, scientific computing
- Workplaces: University of California, Berkeley
- Thesis: Delaunay Refinement Mesh Generation (1997)
- Doctoral advisor: Gary Miller and David O'Hallaron
- Website: people.eecs.berkeley.edu/~jrs/

Jonathan Richard Shewchuk is a Canadian computer scientist and professor in the Department of Electrical Engineering and Computer Sciences at the University of California, Berkeley. His research includes scientific computing, computational geometry, mesh generation, numerical robustness, surface reconstruction, numerical methods, machine learning theory, and physically based animation.

Shewchuk widely known for creating Triangle, a widely used two-dimensional mesh-generation program that received the 2003 J. H. Wilkinson Prize for Numerical Software. He is also the author of the widely-read 1994 tutorial An Introduction to the Conjugate Gradient Method Without the Agonizing Pain, an intuitive exposition of the conjugate gradient method; the ACM Digital Library listed more than 3,600 citations to it in September 2026.

== Early life and education ==
Shewchuk, born in Cranbrook, British Columbia, earned a Bachelor of Science in physics and computing science from Simon Fraser University in 1990. He subsequently earned an MS and a PhD in computer science from Carnegie Mellon University, completing his doctorate in 1997 under the supervision of Gary Miller and David O'Hallaron.

His dissertation, Delaunay Refinement Mesh Generation, was done at Carnegie Mellon School of Computer Science where it won the Doctoral Dissertation Award for the best thesis of 1997. During his graduate work, he participated in Carnegie Mellon's Quake Project, a multidisciplinary effort to develop large-scale finite-element earthquake simulations. The project received the Allen Newell Award for Research Excellence in 1998.

Shewchuk joined the Berkeley faculty in 1998.

He appears in online course videos of CS 61B: Data Structures class in University of California, Berkeley.
