= Diffpack =

- Initial release: 1991
- Written in: C++, Python, Perl
- Operating system: Linux, Unix, Mac OS X, Windows
- Type: Scientific simulation software
- License: proprietary (until 1997 public domain software)
- Website: www.diffpack.de

Diffpack is a programming environment for developing simulation software for scientific and engineering applications. Diffpack has its main focus on the numerical modeling and solution of partial differential equations, in particular by the finite element method and the finite difference method (finite volume method is also supported to some extent).

== Features ==
The Diffpack software consists of a family of C++ libraries for general tasks related to numerical solution of partial differential equations, plus a set of Perl and Python scripts that ease the development of simulation programs and problem solving environments for scientific or engineering research. The package was one of the first to explore object-oriented programming and the C++ language for advanced, high-performance computing.

== History ==
Diffpack has been actively developed since 1991, with main contributions from University of Oslo and the research institutes SINTEF and Simula Research Laboratory. The initiators and main contributors to Diffpack in the 1990s were Hans Petter Langtangen and Are Magnus Bruaset. Version 1.0 of the software was released in the public domain in 1995, with a new version in 1997.

The Norwegian company Numerical Objects AS took over the rights of Diffpack 1997 and commercialized the product. In 2003, the German company inuTech GmbH purchased Diffpack and is now the principal maintainer and developer of the software.

== Adoption ==
Past and present Diffpack customers include AREVA NP, Air Force Research Laboratory, Robert Bosch GmbH, Cambridge University, Canon, CEA, CalCom, DaimlerChrysler, Furukawa, Harvard University, Intel, Mitsubishi, NASA, Nestle, Nippon Steel, Shell, Siemens, Stanford University, Statoil, Veritas, VAI GmbH, and Xerox. Diffpack applications have been built in diverse areas, such as oil and gas, mechanical engineering, telecommunication, medicine and finance. The customer activities span from simple prototype applications to projects involving several man-years of simulator development.

== See also ==
- List of finite element software packages
- List of numerical analysis software
