= Yanyuan Ma =

Chinese-American statistician

Yanyuan Ma is a Chinese-American mathematical statistician whose research interests include semiparametric models, dimension reduction, selection bias, and skew-symmetric distributions. She is a professor of statistics at Pennsylvania State University.

== Education and career ==
Ma has a 1994 bachelor's degree in mathematics from Peking University. She began her doctoral studies at Stanford University, but switched after a year to the Massachusetts Institute of Technology, where she completed a Ph.D. in applied mathematics in 1999. Her dissertation, Studies in Matrix Perturbation and Robust Statistics, was jointly supervised by mathematician and computer scientist Alan Edelman and by statistician Marc G. Genton.

After working in industry, and then as a postdoctoral researcher beginning in 2002, she took an assistant professorship at Texas A&M University in 2004. From 2006 to 2008 she was a professor at the University of Neuchâtel in Switzerland, but she returned to Texas A&M as an associate professor in 2008, bringing her doctoral student Tanya P. Garcia with her. At Texas A&M, she was promoted to full professor in 2011. She became a professor of statistics at the University of South Carolina, from 2014 until 2016, when she moved again to her present position at Pennsylvania State University.

== Recognition ==
Ma was named as a Fellow of the Institute of Mathematical Statistics in 2017, "for influential and original contributions to the development of dimension reduction techniques, and to semiparametric theory and methodology". She was also elected as a Fellow of the American Statistical Association in 2017.
