= Tanya P. Garcia =

American biostatistician

Tanya Pamela Garcia is a Peruvian-American biostatistician whose research applies robust statistics to understand the progression of neurodegenerative diseases including Huntington's disease, and to classify gut microbiota. She is an associate professor of biostatistics in the UNC Gillings School of Global Public Health in Chapel Hill, North Carolina. She is the 2025 chair of the Biometrics Section of the American Statistical Association.

== Early life and education ==
Garcia is originally from Lima, Peru, and grew up in San Jose, California. She majored in mathematics as an undergraduate at the University of California, Irvine, graduating in 2003. There, she developed her interest in statistics and its applications in health through an undergraduate course in the subject, required for her degree. However, she became a research assistant in the Institute of Operations Research and Logistics at RWTH Aachen University, and returned to the US for a master's degree in industrial engineering and operations research at the University of California, Berkeley, in 2005.

At this point she switched directions to statistics and earned a second master's degree in statistics from the University of Western Ontario in Canada in 2006. She was a teaching assistant and doctoral student in Switzerland at the University of Neuchâtel from 2006 to 2008, working there on real-time tracking of forest fires. Her future doctoral advisor Yanyuan Ma was a faculty member in Neuchâtel in the same years, and when Ma returned to Texas A&M University in 2008, Garcia also moved to Texas A&M. She earned her Ph.D. in statistics there in 2011, also visiting the MD Anderson Cancer Center and Oak Ridge National Laboratory as a student. Her dissertation, Efficient semiparametric estimators for biological, genetic, and measurement error applications, was supervised by Ma.

== Career ==
After completing her Ph.D., Garcia continued at Texas A&M University, first in a temporary research assistant professor position in statistics and then in 2013 becoming a regular-rank assistant professor in the Department of Epidemiology and Biostatistics of the Texas A&M University School of Public Health. In 2018, she returned to the statistics department as a tenured associate professor, before moving in 2020 to her present position in the UNC Gillings School of Global Public Health.

She is the 2024 chair-elect and 2025 chair of the Biometrics Section of the American Statistical Association.

== Recognition ==
Garcia is the recipient of the 2024 Gertrude M. Cox Award of the Washington Statistical Society. She was elected as a Fellow of the American Statistical Association in 2024.
