= Aslak Tveito =

Norwegian scientist

- Born: 17 February 1961 (age 65)
- Education: University of Oslo
- Scientific career
- Fields: Numerical analysis Scientific computing
- Workplaces: University of Oslo

Aslak Tveito (born 17 February 1961) is a Norwegian scientist in the field of numerical analysis and scientific computing. Tveito was the Managing Director of the Simula Research Laboratory, a Norwegian research center owned by the Norwegian Government, and is Professor of Scientific Computing at the University of Oslo.

== Education and career ==
Tveito obtained an MSc degree in Numerical Analysis from the University of Oslo, Department of Informatics in 1985. He obtained PhD from the same department in 1988, focusing on numerical solution of partial differential equations.

In 1991 Tveito joined the Applied Mathematics department at SINTEF as a research scientist and from 1993 to 1997 held the position of Chief Scientist. He was appointed Professor of Numerical Analysis at the University of Oslo, Department of Informatics in 1994.

In 1997 Tveito co-founded Numerical Objects, a company that commercialized the Diffpack software, and served on its board until 2001.

Tveito joined the Simula Research Laboratory upon its establishment in 2001 and has been its Managing Director since 2002. The scientific computing activities at Simula have been awarded the top grade, Excellent, in all international evaluations in their lifetime (2001–2015) During this time he has retained his Professorship at the University of Oslo, and also served as Chairman of the Board of Simula Innovation (2006–2008), Kalkulo (2006–2008), Simula School of Research and Innovation (2007–2010), Simula UiB (2016–2017), Simula Metropolitan Center for Digital Engineering (2018–2019) and the Norwegian Defence Research Establishment (2021-).

Tveito is a member of the Norwegian Academy of Technological Sciences.

== Research ==
Tveito's research has included the numerical solution of linear systems arising from the discretization of partial differential equations; the numerical and mathematical analysis of hyperbolic conservation laws; mathematical models of two-phase flow; upscaling; nonlinear water waves; the numerical solution of the Black-Scholes equations; parallel computing for partial differential equations; and numerical software tools. In his early career he focused on numerical analysis, before shifting to research on software and computing tools, parallel computing, and the application of computational models in science.

Since 2005 he has worked almost exclusively on mathematical and computational issues related to understanding the electrophysiology of the heart. He is involved in the Centre for Integrative Neuroplasticity (CINPLA) at the University of Oslo.

== Authorship ==
Tveito has co-authored three research monographs [1, 2, 3] and two textbooks in scientific computing [4, 5]. He has co-edited seven books, and has published more than 100 papers in international journals, collections, and proceedings. A complete publication list can be found at Google Scholar.

Tveito is on the editorial board of Encyclopedia of Applied and Computational Mathematics.

== Selected bibliography ==
1. Sundnes, G. T. Lines, X. Cai, B. F. Nielsen, K.-A. Mardal, and A. Tveito. Computing the Electrical Activity in the Heart. Springer-Verlag Berlin Heidelberg, 2006. ISBN 978-3-540-33437-8
2. A. Tveito and G. Lines. Computing characterizations of drugs for ion channels and receptors using Markov models. Springer-Verlag, lecture notes in Computational Science and Engineering, vol 111, 2016. ISBN 978-3-319-30029-0
3. A. Tveito, K.A. Mardal, and M. Rognes. Modeling Excitable Tissue. Simula SpringerBriefs on Computing, 2021. ISBN 978-3-030-61156-9
4. A. Tveito and R. Winther. Introduction to partial differential equations. A computational approach. Springer-Verlag Berlin-Heidelberg, 2nd ed. 2009. (also available in German).
5. A. Tveito, H. P. Langtangen, B. F. Nielsen, and X. Cai, Elements of Scientific Computing. Springer-Verlag Berlin-Heidelberg, 2010. ISBN 978-3-642-11299-7
