= Simula Metropolitan Center for Digital Engineering =

Norwegian research organization

- SimulaMet
- Established: May 2018; 8 years ago
- Registration no.: 920203612
- Location(s): Stensberggata 27, Oslo, Norway
- Coordinates: 59°55′17.1876″N 10°44′10.2336″E
- Website: www.simulamet.no

Simula Metropolitan Center for Digital Engineering AS (SimulaMet) is a non-profit research organization jointly owned by Simula Research Laboratory and Oslo Metropolitan University. It serves as the hub for Simula’s research activities in networks and communications, machine learning and artificial intelligence, and IT management. SimulaMet's mission is to conduct research in digital engineering at the highest international level, to educate and supervise Ph.D. and master's students at OsloMet, and to contribute to innovation in society through collaboration, startup companies, and licensing of research results.

== Background ==
The center was established in 2018 to address the national and European need to bolster research and educational capacity in the ICT and digitalization sector.

== Organization ==
The center is located at Holbergs Terrasse nearby OsloMet’s premises in the Bislett neighborhood of Oslo. Klas Pettersen is the director of SimulaMet, and Simula Research Laboratory owns 51 percent in the company, while Oslo Metropolitan University owns 49 percent.

SimulaMet consists of five departments in three research units:

- Communication Systems:
  - Center for Resilient Networks and Applications (CRNA)
- Artificial Intelligence:
  - Data Science and Knowledge Discovery (DataSci)
  - Holistic Systems (HOST)
  - Signal and Information Processing for Intelligent Systems (SIGIPRO)
- Information Technology Management:
  - IT Management

== Research and activities ==
As a partner of OsloMet, the SimulaMet has contributed to the development of a Ph.D. program in digital engineering, as well as to the establishment of the OsloMet AI Lab. The OsloMet AI Lab is a research center that oversees research and student projects in artificial intelligence.

The Center for Resilient Networks and Applications (CRNA) was established in 2014 with a focus on enhancing the robustness and security of Information and Communications Technology (ICT) infrastructures. The Ministry of Local Government and Modernization has mandated specific responsibilities to the center. This includes operating the NorNet infrastructure for monitoring the state of the Norwegian telecommunications infrastructure, particularly the mobile broadband networks, publishing an annual report on it as well as other publications, and providing a real-time visualization. CRNA is furthermore very active in the Norwegian open source community for Linux and FreeBSD, developing and maintaining several software packages, mainly in the area of computer networking. Particularly well-known packages being included in Debian Linux, Ubuntu Linux, as well as FreeBSD are NetPerfMeter, HiPerConTracer, SubNetCalc, tools for the IETF Reliable Server Pooling framework, as well as BibTeXConv.
