= Software system =

Intercommunicating software components forming part of a computer system

A software system is a system of intercommunicating components based on software forming part of a computer system (a combination of hardware and software). It "consists of a number of separate programs, configuration files, which are used to set up these programs, system documentation, which describes the structure of the system, and user documentation, which explains how to use the system".

A software system differs from a computer program or software. While a computer program is generally a set of instructions (source, or object code) that perform a specific task, a software system is more of an encompassing concept with many more components such as specification, test results, end-user documentation, and maintenance records.

The use of the term software system is at times related to the application of systems theory approaches in the context of software engineering. A software system consists of several separate computer programs and associated configuration files, documentation, etc., that operate together. The concept is used in the study of large and complex software, because it focuses on the major components of software and their interactions. It is also related to the field of software architecture.

Software systems are an active area of research for groups interested in software engineering in particular and systems engineering in general. Academic journals like the Journal of Systems and Software (published by Elsevier) are dedicated to the subject.

The ACM Software System Award is an annual award that honors people or an organization "for developing a system that has had a lasting influence, reflected in contributions to concepts, in commercial acceptance, or both". It has been awarded by the Association for Computing Machinery (ACM) since 1983, with a cash prize sponsored by IBM.

== Categories ==
Major categories of software systems include those based on application software development, programming software, and system software although the distinction can sometimes be difficult. Examples of software systems include operating systems, computer reservations systems, air traffic control systems, military command and control systems, telecommunication networks, content management systems, database management systems, expert systems, and embedded systems.

== See also ==
- ACM Software System Award
- Common layers in an information system logical architecture
- Computer program
- Computer program installation
- Experimental software engineering
- Software bug
- Software architecture
- System software
- Systems theory
- Systems Science
- Software Engineering
