= Tertiary review =

Systematic review of systematic reviews

In software engineering, a tertiary review is a systematic review of systematic reviews. It is also referred to as a tertiary study in the software engineering literature. However, Umbrella review is the term more commonly used in medicine.

Kitchenham et al. suggest that methodologically there is no difference between a systematic review and a tertiary review. However, as the software engineering community has started performing tertiary reviews new concerns unique to tertiary reviews have surfaced. These include the challenge of quality assessment of systematic reviews, search validation and the additional risk of double counting.

== Examples of Tertiary reviews in software engineering literature ==
- Test quality
- Machine Learning
- Test-driven development
