= Hans Petter Langtangen =

Norwegian scientist

Hans Petter Langtangen (3 January 1962 – 10 October 2016) was a Norwegian scientist trained in mechanics and scientific computing. Langtangen was the director of the Centre for Biomedical Computing, a Norwegian Center of Excellence hosted by Simula Research Laboratory. He was a professor of scientific computing at the University of Oslo, and was editor-in-chief of SIAM Journal on Scientific Computing 2011–2015.

== Career ==
Langtangen held a position as Simula Fellow with Simula Research Laboratory, Norway. In addition to his position as Director of Simula's Centre for Biomedical Computing, he held several leading roles within the field of scientific computing in his time at the lab. The scientific computing activities at Simula have been awarded the top grade, Excellent, in all international evaluations 2001-2015.

In parallel with his work at Simula Research Laboratory, Langtangen held a professorship at the University of Oslo, being on 80% leave since the establishment of Simula in 2001. He joined the Department of Mathematics in 1991, but after being promoted to full Professor in Mechanics at the Department of Mathematics in 1998, he moved to a professorship in Computer Science in 1999.

In addition to his roles at the University of Oslo and Simula Research Laboratory, Langtangen worked at the Department of Scientific Computing at Uppsala University in an adjunct position from 1999 to 2002. Prior to that, he held full-time and part-time positions as research scientist with SINTEF Applied Mathematics department from 1991 to 1997. Langtangen worked with the company Numerical Objects from 1997 to 2003; this company commercialized the Diffpack software, mainly developed by Langtangen and Are Magnus Bruaset.

Langtangen’s formal education was from the Department of Mathematics, University of Oslo. He held a MSc degree from 1985 and PhD degree from 1989, both within the field of Mechanics.

== Research and teaching ==
Langtangen's research was interdisciplinary and revolved around applied mathematics and scientific computing with an emphasis on continuum mechanical modeling, stochastic methods and scientific software design, with applications to biomedicine and geoscience in particular. His last research is focused on cerebrospinal fluid flow in the brain and spine as well as methods for uncertainty quantification.

Langtangen was involved in the newly established Centre for Integrative Neuroplasticity (CINPLA) at the University of Oslo. He was also involved with developing and distributing scientific software to make research results more widely accessible and help accelerate research elsewhere.

For over three decades he was active with teaching and supervision. He was particularly involved in reforming science education through developing innovative courses and textbooks in the world-leading Computing in Science Education project at the University of Oslo. For this work he received the Olav Thon Foundation prize for Excellence in Teaching in 2016. Together with colleagues in the Computing in Science Education project he also received awards from NOKUT and the University of Oslo for his educational contributions.

Langtangen was a member of the Norwegian Academy of Science and Letters and the European Academy of Sciences.

On October 10, 2016, Hans Petter Langtangen died after a long battle with cancer.

== Authorship ==
Langtangen’s early research focused on numerical methods, in particular finite element methods and preconditioning for incompressible viscous flow and flow through porous media. During the early and mid 1990s, Langtangen pioneered and developed Diffpack, a general C++ software library for the finite element solution of partial differential equations. Diffpack was one of the first object-oriented libraries of its kind.

Langtangen was the author of three highly cited, best-selling textbooks on the subject of scientific computing and numerical methods: Computational partial differential equations – numerical methods and Diffpack programming; Python scripting for computational science; and A primer on scientific programming with Python. Langtangen also promoted the use of Python for scientific computing through numerous journal papers and conference talks.

Langtangen was the editor of the scientific computing field in Encyclopedia of Applied and Computational Mathematics. He served on the editorial boards of many scientific journals, including SIAM Journal on Scientific Computing, Advances in Water Resources, BIT Numerical Mathematics, International Journal of Computational Science and Engineering and Journal of Computational Science.

== Selected bibliography ==
=== Books ===
- Bruaset, A. M. & Langtangen, H. P. (1997). "Chapter 4: A comprehensive set of tools for solving partial differential equations; Diffpack". In Dæhlen, M. & Tveito, A. (eds.). Numerical Methods and Software Tools in Industrial Mathematics. Birkhauser. pp. 61–90. CiteSeerX 10.1.1.39.9. doi:10.1007/978-1-4612-1984-2_4. ISBN 978-1-4612-7367-7.
- Langtangen, Hans Petter (2003). Computational partial differential equations: numerical methods and Diffpack programming. Texts in Computational Science and Engineering (1st ed.). Springer. ISBN 978-3-540-43416-0.
- Langtangen, Hans Petter (2008). Python scripting for computational science. Texts in Computational Science and Engineering (1st ed.). Springer. ISBN 978-3-540-73915-9.
- Langtangen, Hans Petter (2016). A Primer on Scientific Programming with Python. Texts in Computational Science and Engineering (5 ed.). Springer. ISBN 978-3-662-49887-3.
- Langtangen, Hans Petter (2016). Scaling of Differential Equations. Simula SpringerBriefs on Computing (1 ed.). Springer. ISBN 978-3-319-32726-6.
- Langtangen, Hans Petter (2016). Solving PDEs in Python. Simula SpringerBriefs on Computing (1 ed.). Springer. ISBN 978-3-319-52462-7.
- Langtangen, Hans Petter (2016). Finite Difference Computing with Exponential Decay Models. Lecture Notes in Computational Science and Engineering (1 ed.). Springer. ISBN 978-3-319-29439-1.

=== Articles in journals ===
- Langtangen, H. P.; Mardal, K.-A.; Winther, R. (2002). "Numerical methods for incompressible viscous flow". Advances in Water Resources. 25 (8): 1125–1146. Bibcode:2002AdWR...25.1125L. CiteSeerX 10.1.1.116.6616. doi:10.1016/S0309-1708(02)00052-0.
- Langtangen, H. P.; Tveito, A.; Winther, R. (1992). "Instability of Buckley-Leverett flow in a heterogeneous medium". Transport in Porous Media. 9 (3): 165–185. Bibcode:1992TPMed...9..165L. doi:10.1007/BF00611965. S2CID 121708921.
- Linge, S.; Haughton, V.; Løvgren, A. E.; Mardal, K.-A.; Langtangen, H. P. (2010). "CSF Flow Dynamics at the Cranio-Vertebral Junction Studied With an Idealized Model of the Subarachnoid Space and Computational Flow Analysis". American Journal of Neuroradiology. 31 (1): 185–192. doi:10.3174/ajnr.A1766. PMC 7964070. PMID 19729542.
- Valen-Sendstad, K.; Mardal, K.-A.; Mortensen, M.; Reif, B. A. P.; Langtangen, H. P. (2011). "Direct Numerical Simulation of Transitional Flow in a Patient–Specific Intracranial Aneurysm". Journal of Biomechanics. 44 (16): 2826–2832. doi:10.1016/j.jbiomech.2011.08.015. PMID 21924724.
