= Jeff Bezanson =

Computer scientist

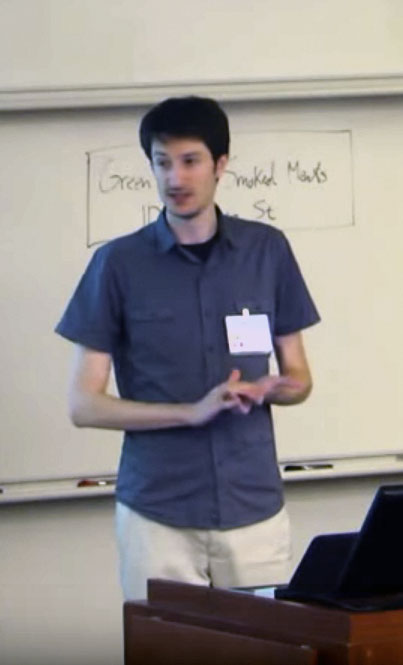
Jeff Bezanson presenting his session "Introduction to Julia Internals" at JuliaCon 2014

Jeff Bezanson (born December 26, 1981) is an American computer scientist best known for co-creating the Julia programming language with Stefan Karpinski, Alan Edelman and Viral B. Shah in 2012. The language spawned Julia Computing Inc. (since then renamed to JuliaHub Inc.) of which Bezanson is the CTO. As a founder of the company and co-creator of the language, Bezanson earned the 2019 J.H. Wilkinson Prize for his work on the Julia programming language alongside Shah and Karpinski. Bezanson is also listed as an author on academic papers regarding the Julia language.

== Education ==
After receiving his undergraduate degree from Harvard in 2004, Bezanson moved on to graduate studies and researched in the field of technical computing at MIT and received his PhD in 2015; his thesis is titled Abstraction in Technical Computing (2015).

== Awards ==
In 2019, Bezanson was awarded the J. H. Wilkinson Prize for Numerical Software with Stefan Karpinski and Viral B. Shah for their work on the Julia programming language.
