= Magne Jørgensen =

Norwegian scientist and software engineer

Magne Jørgensen (born 10 October 1964) is a Norwegian scientist and software engineer in the field of scientific computing. Jørgensen is chief research scientist at Simula Research Laboratory and is involved in the Research Group for Programming and Software Engineering as professor at the Department for Informatics at the University of Oslo.

== Career ==
Jørgensen received his Master of Science in economy and computer science from the University of Karlsruhe, Germany, in 1988. In 1994 he received his Ph.D. degree in software engineering from the University of Oslo, Norway, based on a thesis on “Empirical studies of software maintenance”. Jørgensen worked as a senior scientist at Telenor Research and Development from 1989 until 1998, when he moved shortly to Storebrand. In 1999 he became associate professor in software engineering at the Department for Informatics at the University of Oslo, and in 2002 he was appointed full professorship. He has been at Simula Research Laboratory as a chief research scientist and member of the software engineering research group since 2001.

== Research ==
Jørgensen's fields of research include management of software projects, software development methods, judgment and decision-making in software development, and empirical methods for software engineering. The primary focus of Jørgensen's research is estimation of ICT projects.

Together with Tore Dybå and Barbara Kitchenham, he has launched a method for systematic review of empiric experiences in the development of ICT projects, called Evidence-based software engineering. In 2014 Jørgensen, together with Dybå and Kitchenham, received the ACM Sigsoft award for the most influential paper in the last ten years for the initial paper on evidence-based software engineering.

== Research impact and authorship ==
Jørgensen was ranked as the “top scholar”, i.e. the most productive researcher, in system and software engineering for the periods 2001–2005, 2002–2006, 2003-2007 and 2004–2008. The rankings, published in Journal of Systems and Software, is based on number of publications published in the top system and software engineering journal and includes about 4000 researchers.

Since 2004, Jørgensen has been writing a monthly column in the Norwegian magazine Computerworld, transferring research results to software professionals. Jørgensen is a member of the editorial board of Journal of Systems and Software and Evidence-based Information Systems. Previously he was on the editorial board of Software Quality Journal.

Jørgensen was assessed by Computerworld Norway to be one of the fifty most influential professionals within ICT in Norway in 2012, 2013 and 2014.

Together with Scienta, Jørgensen compiled a report on successes and failures in public ICT projects. Since 2016 Jørgensen has been Member of the Norwegian Digitization Council.

== Selected works ==
- Kitchenham, Barbara A., Tore Dybå, and Magne Jørgensen. "Evidence-based software engineering." Proceedings of the 26th international conference on software engineering. IEEE Computer Society, 2004.
- Dybå, Tore, Barbara A. Kitchenham, and Magne Jørgensen. "Evidence-based software engineering for practitioners." IEEE Software 22.1 (2005): 58–65.
- Jørgensen, Magne, and Martin Shepperd. "A systematic review of software development cost estimation studies." Software Engineering, IEEE Transactions on 33.1 (2007): 33–53.
- Moløkken, Kjetil, and Magne Jørgensen. "A review of software surveys on software effort estimation." Empirical Software Engineering, 2003. ISESE 2003. Proceedings. 2003 International Symposium on. IEEE, 2003.
