= Barbara Kitchenham =

British computer scientist

Barbara Ann Kitchenham is a retired British computer scientist and software engineer known for her research on systematic reviews in software engineering and on evidence-based practice in software engineering. She is a professor emerita of computer science at Keele University.

== Education and career ==
Kitchenham was a student at the University of Leeds. She received a bachelor's degree with joint honours in mathematics and statistics in 1969, and a master's degree in statistics in 1970. In 1972 she completed a Ph.D. through the Department of Mining and Mineral Engineering.

She worked in industry as a statistician before joining International Computers Limited (ICL) in the mid-1970s as a systems programmer, later working there on software metrics. After ten years at ICL, and two years as a reader in the Centre for Software Reliability of City, University of London, she moved to the National Computing Centre in Manchester in 1988. Her subsequent affiliations have included NICTA in Australia, and Keele University.

== Recognition ==
Kitchenham's 2004 paper "Evidence-based software engineering", with Tore Dybå and Magne Jørgensen, was the 2014 recipient of the ACM SIGSOFT Impact Paper Award. In 2019, the IEEE Computer Society Technical Committee on Software Engineering gave Kitchenham their Distinguished Women in Science and Engineering (WISE) Leadership Award.
