= Alan Edelman =

American mathematician

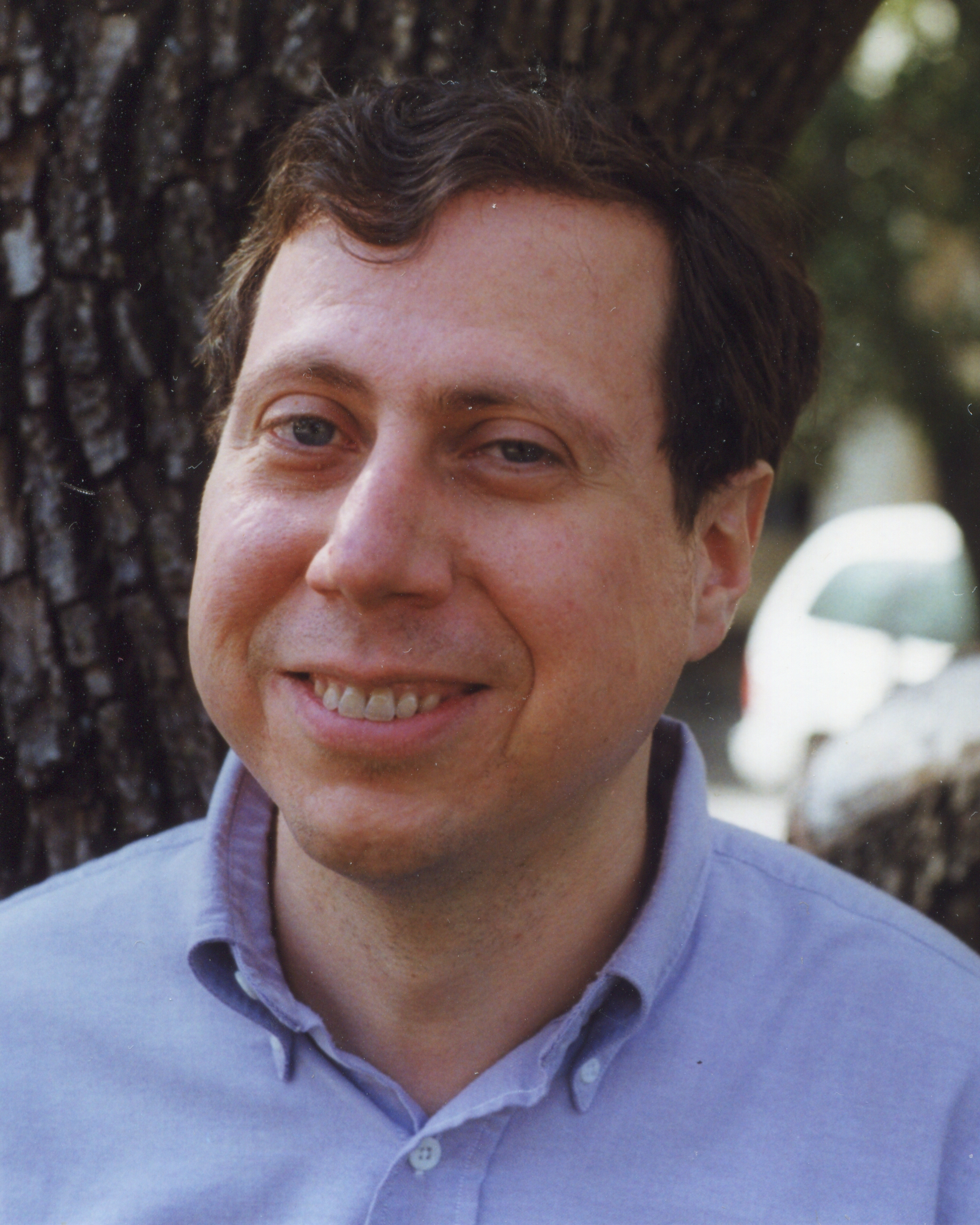
- Edelman in 1999
- Born: June 1963 (age 62); Brooklyn, New York, U.S.
- Education: Yale University (BS, MS); Massachusetts Institute of Technology (PhD)
- Awards: ACM Fellow (2020); IEEE Fellow (2017); AMS Fellow (2015); SIAM Fellow (2011); Chauvenet Prize (1998); IEEE Computer Society Charles Babbage Award (2015); IEEE Sidney Fernbach Award (2019)
- Scientific career
- Fields: Applied mathematics; Computer science
- Institutions: MIT
- Thesis: Eigenvalues and Condition Numbers of Random Matrices (1989)
- Doctoral advisor: Lloyd N. Trefethen
- Doctoral students: Jeff Bezanson; Ioana Dumitriu; Yanyuan Ma
- Website: math.mit.edu/~edelman

Alan Stuart Edelman (born June 1963) is an American mathematician and computer scientist. He is a professor of applied mathematics at the Massachusetts Institute of Technology (MIT) and a Principal Investigator at the MIT Computer Science and Artificial Intelligence Laboratory (CSAIL) where he leads a group in applied computing. In 2004, he founded a business called Interactive Supercomputing which was later acquired by Microsoft. Edelman is a fellow of American Mathematical Society (AMS), Society for Industrial and Applied Mathematics (SIAM), Institute of Electrical and Electronics Engineers (IEEE), and Association for Computing Machinery (ACM), for his contributions in numerical linear algebra, computational science, parallel computing, and random matrix theory. He is one of the creators of the technical programming language Julia.

== Education ==
Edelman received B.S. and M.S. degrees in mathematics from Yale University in 1984, and a Ph.D. in applied mathematics from MIT in 1989 under the direction of Lloyd N. Trefethen. Following a year at Thinking Machines Corporation, and at CERFACS in France, Edelman went to U.C. Berkeley as a Morrey Assistant Professor and Levy Fellow, 1990–93. He joined the MIT faculty in applied mathematics in 1993.

== Research ==
Edelman's research interests include high-performance computing, numerical computation, linear algebra, and random matrix theory.

- In random matrix theory, Edelman is known for the Edelman distribution of the smallest singular value of random matrices (also known as Edelman's law), the invention of beta ensembles, and the introduction of the stochastic operator approach, and some of the earliest computational approaches.
- In high performance computing, Edelman is known for his work on parallel computing, as the co-founder of Interactive Supercomputing, as an inventor of the Julia programming language and for his work on the Future Fast Fourier transform. As the leader of the Julialab, he supervises work on scientific machine learning and compiler methodologies.
- In numerical linear algebra, Edelman is known for eigenvalues and condition numbers of random matrices, the geometry of algorithms with orthogonality constraints, the geometry of the generalized singular value decomposition (GSVD), and applications of Lie algebra to matrix factorizations.

== Awards and honors ==
A Sloan fellow, Edelman received a National Science Foundation (NSF) Faculty Career award in 1995. He has received numerous other awards, among them the

- 1989 Gordon Bell Prize
- 1990 Householder Prize
- 1998 Chauvenet Prize
- 1999 Edgerly Science Partnership Award
- 2000 SIAM Activity Group on Linear Algebra Prize
- 2005 Lester R. Ford Award (with Gilbert Strang)
- 2011 Fellow of SIAM
- 2015 Fellow of the American Mathematical Society
- 2017 Member of IEEE Fellow Class of 2018
- 2019 Winner Sidney Fernbach Award by the IEEE Computer Society
- 2021 ACM Fellow of Class 2020
- 2024 Fellow of the American Association for the Advancement of Science

== See also ==
- Timeline of programming languages
- Julia programming language
