= Simula Research Laboratory =

Norwegian non-profit research organisation

- Simula
- Established: 2001; 25 years ago
- Registration no.: 984648855
- Location(s): Kristian Augusts gate 23, Oslo, Norway
- Coordinates: 59°55′02″N 10°44′10″E
- Website: www.simula.no

Simula Research Laboratory (also known as Simula) is a Norwegian non-profit research organisation located in Oslo, Norway.

Simula was founded in 2001 by the Norwegian government to conduct fundamental, long-term research within information and communication technology (ICT). Simula's research is concentrated on five areas: communication systems, scientific computing, software engineering, cyber security, and artificial intelligence.

In addition to conducting research at a high international level, Simula works to apply research in both industry and the public sector, and to educate students at the masters, graduate, and postdoctoral levels in collaboration with Norwegian and international partner universities.

The organisation includes four subsidiaries, employing over 185 employees from more than 41 countries as of 2024.

== Organization ==
=== Ownership ===
Simula Research Laboratory is registered as a limited company owned by the state and managed by the Norwegian Ministry of Education and Research. It is governed by a board of directors appointed by the owner. The board appoints a managing director (CEO), who, in turn, decides how Simula should operate daily. Dr. Lillian Røstad has been the managing director since 2023. Professor Aslak Tveito led Simula from 2002 to 2022.

=== Simula companies ===
Since the establishment of Simula Research Laboratory in 2001, several subsidiaries have been created to organise Simula's activities in research, education and innovation. These are spread over three locations in Norway:

- Simula Research Laboratory, established in 2001 and fully owned by the state, managed by the Norwegian Ministry of Education and Research. Simula is led by Dr. Lillian Røstad. Simula Research Laboratory is currently located in downtown Oslo, Norway since 2021, and was previously located at Fornebu, Bærum, Norway.
- Simula UiB was jointly established in 2016 by Simula Research Laboratory and the University of Bergen (UiB). The organisation is led by Professor Carlos Cid and is located in downtown Bergen, Norway.
- Simula Metropolitan Center for Digital Engineering (SimulaMet) was jointly established by Simula Research Laboratory and Oslo Metropolitan University (OsloMet) in 2018. The center is led by Klas Pettersen and is located at Holbergs Terrasse nearby OsloMet's campus in downtown Oslo, Norway.
- Simula Innovation, established in 2004, is a wholly owned subsidiary (led by Ottar Hovind), and manages Simula's investment portfolio.

=== Funding ===
Simula is funded from several different sources. There is allocated, basic funding and long-term projects from the Norwegian government. The remaining funding is secured from external sources, mainly research grants from the European Union and the Research Council of Norway, and from industry projects.

=== Name ===
Simula Research Laboratory is named after the programming language Simula, which was developed by the Norwegian scientists Kristen Nygaard and Ole-Johan Dahl. Both men received the A. M. Turing Award in 2001 and the IEEE John von Neumann Medal in 2002 for their contribution to the development of object-oriented programming.

Simula was named after the language to honour the outstanding scientific achievement of Nygaard and Dahl, and to encourage research that meets the highest standards of quality.

== Activities ==
Simula's main objective is to conduct basic and applied research and provide education in select areas of information and communications technology (ICT), thereby contributing to innovation in society.

=== Research ===
Simula conducts long-term, fundamental research in the following five fields: Communication Systems, Cyber Security, Scientific Computing, Software Engineering and Artificial Intelligence. The research is focused on core challenges that combine technological development, with utility for industry and society overall.

Simula is host for the national infrastructure Experimental Infrastructure for Exploration of Exascale Computing (eX3), a national research infrastructure funded by the Research Council of Norway. The eX3 allows high-performance computing (HPC) researchers throughout Norway and their collaborators abroad to experiment hands-on with emerging HPC technologies: hardware and software.

Simula hosts several national research centers funded by the Research Council of Norway: the Centre for Sustainable, Risk-Averse and Ethical AI (SURE-AI), the Centre for Quantum Communication Networks and Applications (QCNA) and the Norwegian Quantum Software Centre (NorQSoft). And is a partner in a K.G. Jebsen Centre on Brain Fluid Research. Simula has hosted prior centres of excellence and innovation including the Centre for Biomedical Computing (a Center of Excellence; SFF) and Certus (a Centre for Research-based Innovation; SFI), and been a partner in the Center for Cardiological Innovation and SIRIUS HPC. Currently Simula is a partner in ProCardio (Precision Health Center for optimised cardiac care; SFI).

Through its subsidiary SimulaMet, Simula hosts the Centre for Resilient Networks and Applications (CRNA) and the Centre for Effective Digitalization of the Public Sector (EDOS), funded by the Norwegian Ministry of Digitalization and Public Administration.

In February 2026, Simula established the Centre for AI Security and Safety (CAISS).

=== Innovation ===
Simula Innovation manages Simula's investment portfolio that, as of 2024, includes 32 companies. Applied research occurs in each research group, while R&D consulting services to organisations is offered through the Department of Applied AI.

=== Education ===
Through the Simula Academy and in collaboration with national and international degree-awarding institutions, Simula supervises master students, PhD students, and postdoctoral fellows. As of 2024, Simula had supervised 203 PhD candidates and 635 Master’s students to the completion of their degree.

=== Major international collaborations ===
Simula and the University of California, San Diego (UCSD) collaborate on educating master- and PhD-students through the PhD program SUURPh, and through the joint Summer School in Computational Physiology (SSCP).

Inria (French Institute for Research in Computer Science and Automation) and Simula have a collaboration with a scientific footprint. Currently, several departments at Simula are connected with Inria through Associate Teams, and more will be developed following a cooperation agreement signed in February 2026. Inria is a French research institute within computer science and applied mathematics. With around 3500 researchers and engineers, Inria has a history of excellence in basic and applied industrial research.

Simula is one of the founding partners of NORA (Norwegian Artificial Intelligence Research Consortium), which aims to strengthen Norwegian research, education and innovation within artificial intelligence, machine learning and robotics, as well as other relevant research that supports the development of artificial intelligence applications.

=== Continuing education offers ===
In addition to research education, Simula offers training to research fellows and scientists to prepare them for careers in academia or industry, as well as professional development courses.

== See also ==
- Aslak Tveito
- Hans Petter Langtangen
- Magne Jørgensen
- Olav Lysne
- Marianne Aasen
- Simula
