= Complex dynamics =

Branch of mathematics

Complex dynamics, or holomorphic dynamics, is the study of dynamical systems obtained by iterating a complex analytic mapping. This article focuses on the case of algebraic dynamics, where a polynomial or rational function is iterated. In geometric terms, that amounts to iterating a mapping from some algebraic variety to itself. The related theory of arithmetic dynamics studies iteration over the rational numbers or the p-adic numbers instead of the complex numbers.

== Dynamics in complex dimension 1 ==
A simple example that shows some of the main issues in complex dynamics is the mapping $f(z)=z^2$ from the complex numbers C to itself. It is helpful to view this as a map from the complex projective line $\mathbf{CP}^1$ to itself, by adding a point $\infty$ to the complex numbers. ($\mathbf{CP}^1$ has the advantage of being compact.) The basic question is: given a point $z$ in $\mathbf{CP}^1$, how does its orbit (or forward orbit)

$$z,\; f(z)=z^2,\; f(f(z))=z^4, f(f(f(z)))=z^8,\; \ldots$$

behave, qualitatively? The answer is: if the absolute value |z| is less than 1, then the orbit converges to 0, in fact more than exponentially fast. If |z| is greater than 1, then the orbit converges to the point $\infty$ in $\mathbf{CP}^1$, again more than exponentially fast. (Here 0 and $\infty$ are superattracting fixed points of f, meaning that the derivative of f is zero at those points. An attracting fixed point means one where the derivative of f has absolute value less than 1.)

On the other hand, suppose that $|z|=1$, meaning that z is on the unit circle in C. At these points, the dynamics of f is chaotic, in various ways. For example, for almost all points z on the circle in terms of measure theory, the forward orbit of z is dense in the circle, and in fact uniformly distributed on the circle. There are also infinitely many periodic points on the circle, meaning points with $f^r(z)=z$ for some positive integer r. (Here $f^r(z)$ means the result of applying f to z r times, $f(f(\cdots(f(z))\cdots))$.) Even at periodic points z on the circle, the dynamics of f can be considered chaotic, since points near z diverge exponentially fast from z upon iterating f. (The periodic points of f on the unit circle are repelling: if $f^r(z)=z$, the derivative of $f^r$ at z has absolute value greater than 1.)

Pierre Fatou and Gaston Julia showed in the late 1910s that much of this story extends to any complex algebraic map from $\mathbf{CP}^1$ to itself of degree greater than 1. (Such a mapping may be given by a polynomial $f(z)$ with complex coefficients, or more generally by a rational function.) Namely, there is always a compact subset of $\mathbf{CP}^1$, the Julia set, on which the dynamics of f is chaotic. For the mapping $f(z)=z^2$, the Julia set is the unit circle. For other polynomial mappings, the Julia set is often highly irregular, for example a fractal in the sense that its Hausdorff dimension is not an integer. This occurs even for mappings as simple as $f(z)=z^2+c$ for a constant $c\in\mathbf{C}$. The Mandelbrot set is the set of complex numbers c such that the Julia set of $f(z)=z^2+c$ is connected.

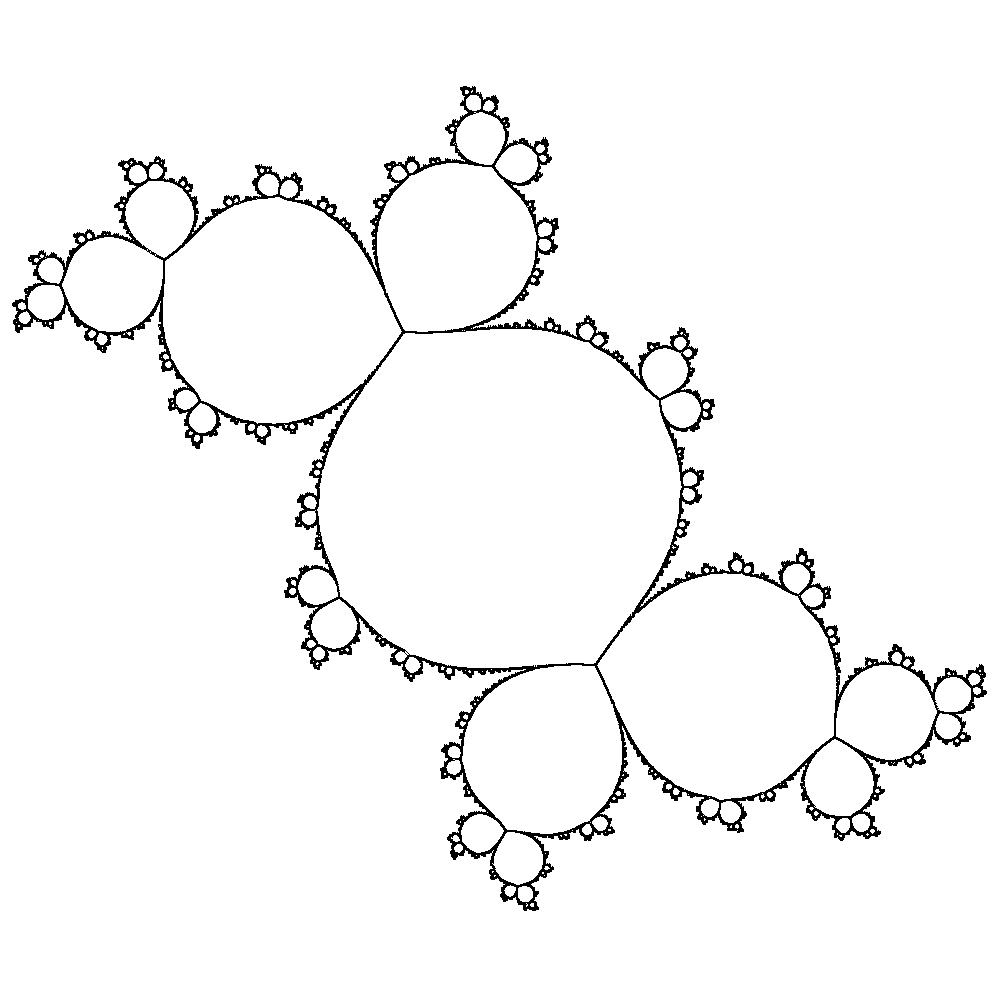
The Julia set of the polynomial $f(z)=z^2+az$ with $a\doteq -0.5+0.866i$

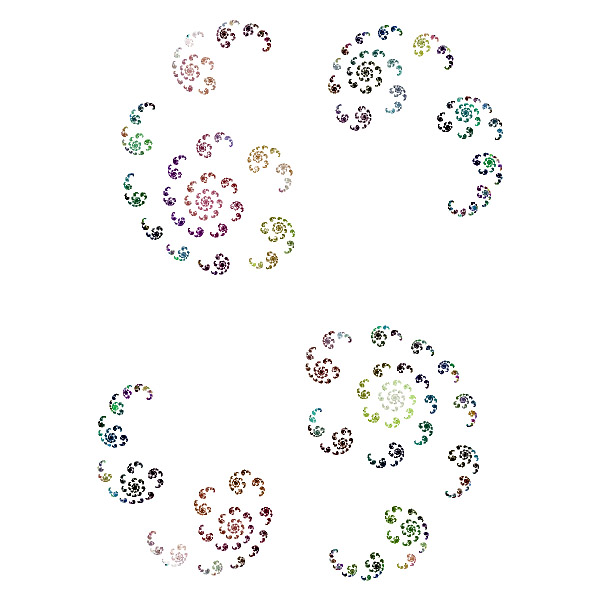
The Julia set of the polynomial $f(z)=z^2+c$ with $c\doteq 0.383-0.0745i$. This is a Cantor set.

There is a rather complete classification of the possible dynamics of a rational function $f\colon\mathbf{CP}^1\to \mathbf{CP}^1$ in the Fatou set, the complement of the Julia set, where the dynamics is "tame". Namely, Dennis Sullivan showed that each connected component U of the Fatou set is pre-periodic, meaning that there are natural numbers $a<b$ such that $f^a(U)=f^b(U)$. Therefore, to analyze the dynamics on a component U, one can assume after replacing f by an iterate that $f(U)=U$. Then either (1) U contains an attracting fixed point for f; (2) U is parabolic in the sense that all points in U approach a fixed point in the boundary of U; (3) U is a Siegel disk, meaning that the action of f on U is conjugate to an irrational rotation of the open unit disk; or (4) U is a Herman ring, meaning that the action of f on U is conjugate to an irrational rotation of an open annulus. (Note that the "backward orbit" of a point z in U, the set of points in $\mathbf{CP}^1$ that map to z under some iterate of f, need not be contained in U.)

== The equilibrium measure of an endomorphism ==
Complex dynamics has been effectively developed in any dimension. This section focuses on the mappings from complex projective space $\mathbf{CP}^n$ to itself, the richest source of examples. The main results for $\mathbf{CP}^n$ have been extended to a class of rational maps from any projective variety to itself. Note, however, that many varieties have no interesting self-maps.

Let f be an endomorphism of $\mathbf{CP}^n$, meaning a morphism of algebraic varieties from $\mathbf{CP}^n$ to itself, for a positive integer n. Such a mapping is given in homogeneous coordinates by

$$f([z_0,\ldots,z_n])=[f_0(z_0,\ldots,z_n),\ldots,f_n(z_0,\ldots,z_n)]$$

for some homogeneous polynomials $f_0,\ldots,f_n$ of the same degree d that have no common zeros in $\mathbf{CP}^n$. (By Chow's theorem, this is the same thing as a holomorphic mapping from $\mathbf{CP}^n$ to itself.) Assume that d is greater than 1; then the degree of the mapping f is $d^n$, which is also greater than 1.

Then there is a unique probability measure $\mu_f$ on $\mathbf{CP}^n$, the equilibrium measure of f, that describes the most chaotic part of the dynamics of f. (It has also been called the Green measure or measure of maximal entropy.) This measure was defined by Hans Brolin (1965) for polynomials in one variable, by Alexandre Freire, Artur Lopes, Ricardo Mañé, and Mikhail Lyubich for $n=1$ (around 1983), and by John Hubbard, Peter Papadopol, John Fornaess, and Nessim Sibony in any dimension (around 1994). The small Julia set $J^*(f)$ is the support of the equilibrium measure in $\mathbf{CP}^n$; this is simply the Julia set when $n=1$.

=== Examples ===
- For the mapping $f(z)=z^2$ on $\mathbf{CP}^1$, the equilibrium measure $\mu_f$ is the Haar measure (the standard measure, scaled to have total measure 1) on the unit circle $|z|=1$.
- More generally, for an integer $d>1$, let $f\colon \mathbf{CP}^n\to\mathbf{CP}^n$ be the mapping

$$f([z_0,\ldots,z_n])=[z_0^d,\ldots,z_n^d].$$

Then the equilibrium measure $\mu_f$ is the Haar measure on the n-dimensional torus $\{[1,z_1,\ldots,z_n]: |z_1|=\cdots=|z_n|=1\}.$ For more general holomorphic mappings from $\mathbf{CP}^n$ to itself, the equilibrium measure can be much more complicated, as one sees already in complex dimension 1 from pictures of Julia sets.

=== Characterizations of the equilibrium measure ===
A basic property of the equilibrium measure is that it is invariant under f, in the sense that the pushforward measure $f_*\mu_f$ is equal to $\mu_f$. Because f is a finite morphism, the pullback measure $f^*\mu_f$ is also defined, and $\mu_f$ is totally invariant in the sense that $f^*\mu_f=\deg(f)\mu_f$.

One striking characterization of the equilibrium measure is that it describes the asymptotics of almost every point in $\mathbf{CP}^n$ when followed backward in time, by Jean-Yves Briend, Julien Duval, Tien-Cuong Dinh, and Sibony. Namely, for a point z in $\mathbf{CP}^n$ and a positive integer r, consider the probability measure $(1/d^{rn})(f^r)^*(\delta_z)$ which is evenly distributed on the $d^{rn}$ points w with $f^r(w)=z$. Then there is a Zariski closed subset $E\subsetneq \mathbf{CP}^n$ such that for all points z not in E, the measures just defined converge weakly to the equilibrium measure $\mu_f$ as r goes to infinity. In more detail: only finitely many closed complex subspaces of $\mathbf{CP}^n$ are totally invariant under f (meaning that $f^{-1}(S)=S$), and one can take the exceptional set E to be the unique largest totally invariant closed complex subspace not equal to $\mathbf{CP}^n$.

Another characterization of the equilibrium measure (due to Briend and Duval) is as follows. For each positive integer r, the number of periodic points of period r (meaning that $f^r(z)=z$), counted with multiplicity, is $(d^{r(n+1)}-1)/(d^r-1)$, which is roughly $d^{rn}$. Consider the probability measure which is evenly distributed on the points of period r. Then these measures also converge to the equilibrium measure $\mu_f$ as r goes to infinity. Moreover, most periodic points are repelling and lie in $J^*(f)$, and so one gets the same limit measure by averaging only over the repelling periodic points in $J^*(f)$. There may also be repelling periodic points outside $J^*(f)$.

The equilibrium measure gives zero mass to any closed complex subspace of $\mathbf{CP}^n$ that is not the whole space. Since the periodic points in $J^*(f)$ are dense in $J^*(f)$, it follows that the periodic points of f are Zariski dense in $\mathbf{CP}^n$. A more algebraic proof of this Zariski density was given by Najmuddin Fakhruddin. Another consequence of $\mu_f$ giving zero mass to closed complex subspaces not equal to $\mathbf{CP}^n$ is that each point has zero mass. As a result, the support $J^*(f)$ of $\mu_f$ has no isolated points, and so it is a perfect set.

The support $J^*(f)$ of the equilibrium measure is not too small, in the sense that its Hausdorff dimension is always greater than zero. In that sense, an endomorphism of complex projective space with degree greater than 1 always behaves chaotically at least on part of the space. (There are examples where $J^*(f)$ is all of $\mathbf{CP}^n$.) Another way to make precise that f has some chaotic behavior is that the topological entropy of f is always greater than zero, in fact equal to $n\log d$, by Mikhail Gromov, Michał Misiurewicz, and Feliks Przytycki.

For any continuous endomorphism f of a compact metric space X, the topological entropy of f is equal to the maximum of the measure-theoretic entropy (or "metric entropy") of all f-invariant measures on X. For a holomorphic endomorphism f of $\mathbf{CP}^n$, the equilibrium measure $\mu_f$ is the unique invariant measure of maximal entropy, by Briend and Duval. This is another way to say that the most chaotic behavior of f is concentrated on the support of the equilibrium measure.

Finally, one can say more about the dynamics of f on the support of the equilibrium measure: f is ergodic and, more strongly, mixing with respect to that measure, by Fornaess and Sibony. It follows, for example, that for almost every point with respect to $\mu_f$, its forward orbit is uniformly distributed with respect to $\mu_f$.

=== Lattès maps ===
A Lattès map is an endomorphism f of $\mathbf{CP}^n$ obtained from an endomorphism of an abelian variety by dividing by a finite group. In this case, the equilibrium measure of f is absolutely continuous with respect to Lebesgue measure on $\mathbf{CP}^n$. Conversely, by Anna Zdunik, François Berteloot, and Christophe Dupont, the only endomorphisms of $\mathbf{CP}^n$ whose equilibrium measure is absolutely continuous with respect to Lebesgue measure are the Lattès examples. That is, for all non-Lattès endomorphisms, $\mu_f$ assigns its full mass 1 to some Borel set of Lebesgue measure 0.

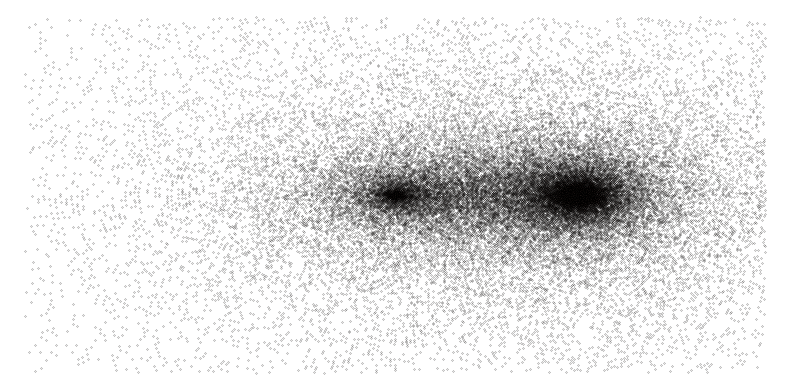
A random sample from the equilibrium measure of the Lattès map $f(z)=(z-2)^2/z^2$. The Julia set is all of $\mathbf{CP}^1$.

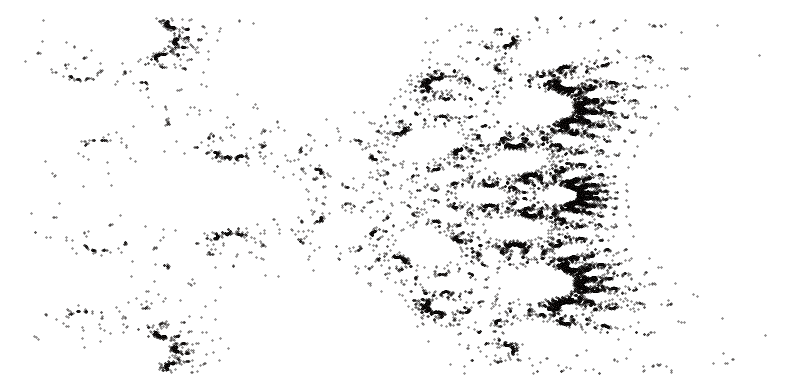
A random sample from the equilibrium measure of the non-Lattès map $f(z)=(z-2)^4/z^4$. The Julia set is all of $\mathbf{CP}^1$, but the equilibrium measure is highly irregular.

In dimension 1, more is known about the "irregularity" of the equilibrium measure. Namely, define the Hausdorff dimension of a probability measure $\mu$ on $\mathbf{CP}^1$ (or more generally on a smooth manifold) by

$$\dim(\mu)=\inf \{\dim_H(Y):\mu(Y)=1\},$$

where $\dim_H(Y)$ denotes the Hausdorff dimension of a Borel set Y. For an endomorphism f of $\mathbf{CP}^1$ of degree greater than 1, Zdunik showed that the dimension of $\mu_f$ is equal to the Hausdorff dimension of its support (the Julia set) if and only if f is conjugate to a Lattès map, a Chebyshev polynomial (up to sign), or a power map $f(z)=z^{\pm d}$ with $d\geq 2$. (In the latter cases, the Julia set is all of $\mathbf{CP}^1$, a closed interval, or a circle, respectively.) Thus, outside those special cases, the equilibrium measure is highly irregular, assigning positive mass to some closed subsets of the Julia set with smaller Hausdorff dimension than the whole Julia set.

== Automorphisms of projective varieties ==
More generally, complex dynamics seeks to describe the behavior of rational maps under iteration. One case that has been studied with some success is that of automorphisms of a smooth complex projective variety X, meaning isomorphisms f from X to itself. The case of main interest is where f acts nontrivially on the singular cohomology $H^*(X,\mathbf{Z})$.

Gromov and Yosef Yomdin showed that the topological entropy of an endomorphism (for example, an automorphism) of a smooth complex projective variety is determined by its action on cohomology. Explicitly, for X of complex dimension n and $0\leq p\leq n$, let $d_p$ be the spectral radius of f acting by pullback on the Hodge cohomology group $H^{p,p}(X)\subset H^{2p}(X,\mathbf{C})$. Then the topological entropy of f is

$$h(f)=\max_p \log d_p.$$

(The topological entropy of f is also the logarithm of the spectral radius of f on the whole cohomology $H^*(X,\mathbf{C})$.) Thus f has some chaotic behavior, in the sense that its topological entropy is greater than zero, if and only if it acts on some cohomology group with an eigenvalue of absolute value greater than 1. Many projective varieties do not have such automorphisms, but (for example) many rational surfaces and K3 surfaces do have such automorphisms.

Let X be a compact Kähler manifold, which includes the case of a smooth complex projective variety. Say that an automorphism f of X has simple action on cohomology if: there is only one number p such that $d_p$ takes its maximum value, the action of f on $H^{p,p}(X)$ has only one eigenvalue with absolute value $d_p$, and this is a simple eigenvalue. For example, Serge Cantat showed that every automorphism of a compact Kähler surface with positive topological entropy has simple action on cohomology. (Here an "automorphism" is complex analytic but is not assumed to preserve a Kähler metric on X. In fact, every automorphism that preserves a metric has topological entropy zero.)

For an automorphism f with simple action on cohomology, some of the goals of complex dynamics have been achieved. Dinh, Sibony, and Henry de Thélin showed that there is a unique invariant probability measure $\mu_f$ of maximal entropy for f, called the equilibrium measure (or Green measure, or measure of maximal entropy). (In particular, $\mu_f$ has entropy $\log d_p$ with respect to f.) The support of $\mu_f$ is called the small Julia set $J^*(f)$. Informally: f has some chaotic behavior, and the most chaotic behavior is concentrated on the small Julia set. At least when X is projective, $J^*(f)$ has positive Hausdorff dimension. (More precisely, $\mu_f$ assigns zero mass to all sets of sufficiently small Hausdorff dimension.)

=== Kummer automorphisms ===
Some abelian varieties have an automorphism of positive entropy. For example, let E be a complex elliptic curve and let X be the abelian surface $E\times E$. Then the group $GL(2,\mathbf{Z})$ of invertible $2\times 2$ integer matrices acts on X. Any group element f whose trace has absolute value greater than 2, for example
$$\begin{pmatrix}2&1\\1&1\end{pmatrix}$$
, has spectral radius greater than 1, and so it gives a positive-entropy automorphism of X. The equilibrium measure of f is the Haar measure (the standard Lebesgue measure) on X.

The Kummer automorphisms are defined by taking the quotient space by a finite group of an abelian surface with automorphism, and then blowing up to make the surface smooth. The resulting surfaces include some special K3 surfaces and rational surfaces. For the Kummer automorphisms, the equilibrium measure has support equal to X and is smooth outside finitely many curves. Conversely, Cantat and Dupont showed that for all surface automorphisms of positive entropy except the Kummer examples, the equilibrium measure is not absolutely continuous with respect to Lebesgue measure. In this sense, it is usual for the equilibrium measure of an automorphism to be somewhat irregular.

=== Saddle periodic points ===
A periodic point z of f is called a saddle periodic point if, for a positive integer r such that $f^r(z)=z$, at least one eigenvalue of the derivative of $f^r$ on the tangent space at z has absolute value less than 1, at least one has absolute value greater than 1, and none has absolute value equal to 1. (Thus f is expanding in some directions and contracting at others, near z.) For an automorphism f with simple action on cohomology, the saddle periodic points are dense in the support $J^*(f)$ of the equilibrium measure $\mu_f$. On the other hand, the measure $\mu_f$ vanishes on closed complex subspaces not equal to X. It follows that the periodic points of f (or even just the saddle periodic points contained in the support of $\mu_f$) are Zariski dense in X.

For an automorphism f with simple action on cohomology, f and its inverse map are ergodic and, more strongly, mixing with respect to the equilibrium measure $\mu_f$. It follows that for almost every point z with respect to $\mu_f$, the forward and backward orbits of z are both uniformly distributed with respect to $\mu_f$.

A notable difference with the case of endomorphisms of $\mathbf{CP}^n$ is that for an automorphism f with simple action on cohomology, there can be a nonempty open subset of X on which neither forward nor backward orbits approach the support $J^*(f)$ of the equilibrium measure. For example, Eric Bedford, Kyounghee Kim, and Curtis McMullen constructed automorphisms f of a smooth projective rational surface with positive topological entropy (hence simple action on cohomology) such that f has a Siegel disk, on which the action of f is conjugate to an irrational rotation. Points in that open set never approach $J^*(f)$ under the action of f or its inverse.

At least in complex dimension 2, the equilibrium measure of f describes the distribution of the isolated periodic points of f. (There may also be complex curves fixed by f or an iterate, which are ignored here.) Namely, let f be an automorphism of a compact Kähler surface X with positive topological entropy $h(f)=\log d_1$. Consider the probability measure which is evenly distributed on the isolated periodic points of period r (meaning that $f^r(z)=z$). Then this measure converges weakly to $\mu_f$ as r goes to infinity, by Eric Bedford, Lyubich, and John Smillie. The same holds for the subset of saddle periodic points, because both sets of periodic points grow at a rate of $(d_1)^r$.

== See also ==
- Dynamics in complex dimension 1
  - Complex analysis
  - Complex quadratic polynomial
  - Infinite compositions of analytic functions
  - Montel's theorem
  - Poincaré metric
  - Schwarz lemma
  - Riemann mapping theorem
  - Carathéodory's theorem (conformal mapping)
  - Böttcher's equation
  - Orbit portraits
  - Yoccoz puzzles
- Related areas of dynamics
  - Arithmetic dynamics
  - Chaos theory
  - Symbolic dynamics
