= Mitsuhiro Shishikura =

Japanese mathematician (born 1960)

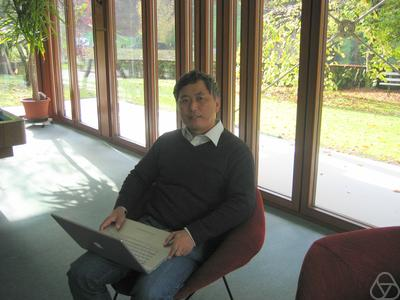
Mitsuhiro Shishikura

Mitsuhiro Shishikura (宍倉 光広, Shishikura Mitsuhiro, born November 27, 1960) is a Japanese mathematician working in the field of complex dynamics. He is professor at Kyoto University in Japan.

Shishikura became internationally recognized for two of his earliest contributions, both of which solved long-standing open problems.

- In his Master's thesis, he proved a conjecture of Fatou from 1920 by showing that a rational function of degree $d\,$ has at most $2d-2\,$ nonrepelling periodic cycles.
- He proved that the boundary of the Mandelbrot set has Hausdorff dimension two, confirming a conjecture stated by Mandelbrot and Milnor.

For his results, he was awarded the Salem Prize in 1992, and the Iyanaga Spring Prize of the Mathematical Society of Japan in 1995.

More recent results of Shishikura include

- (in joint work with Kisaka) the existence of a transcendental entire function with a doubly connected wandering domain, answering a question of Baker from 1985;
- (in joint work with Inou) a study of near-parabolic renormalization which is essential in Buff and Chéritat's recent proof of the existence of polynomial Julia sets of positive planar Lebesgue measure.
- (in joint work with Cheraghi) A proof of the local connectivity of the Mandelbrot set at some infinitely satellite renormalizable points.
- (in joint work with Yang) A proof of the regularity of the boundaries of the high type Siegel disks of quadratic polynomials.

One of the main tools pioneered by Shishikura and used throughout his work is that of quasiconformal surgery.

His doctoral students include Weixiao Shen.
