= Classification of Fatou components =

Components of the Fatou set

In mathematics, Fatou components are components of the Fatou set. They were named after Pierre Fatou.

== Rational case ==
If f is a rational function

$$f = \frac{P(z)}{Q(z)}$$

defined in the extended complex plane, and if it is a nonlinear function (degree > 1)

$$d(f) = \max(\deg(P),\, \deg(Q))\geq 2,$$

then for a periodic component $U$ of the Fatou set, exactly one of the following holds:

1. $U$ contains an attracting periodic point
2. $U$ is parabolic
3. $U$ is a Siegel disc: a simply connected Fatou component on which f(z) is analytically conjugate to a Euclidean rotation of the unit disc onto itself by an irrational rotation angle.
4. $U$ is a Herman ring: a double connected Fatou component (an annulus) on which f(z) is analytically conjugate to a Euclidean rotation of a round annulus, again by an irrational rotation angle.
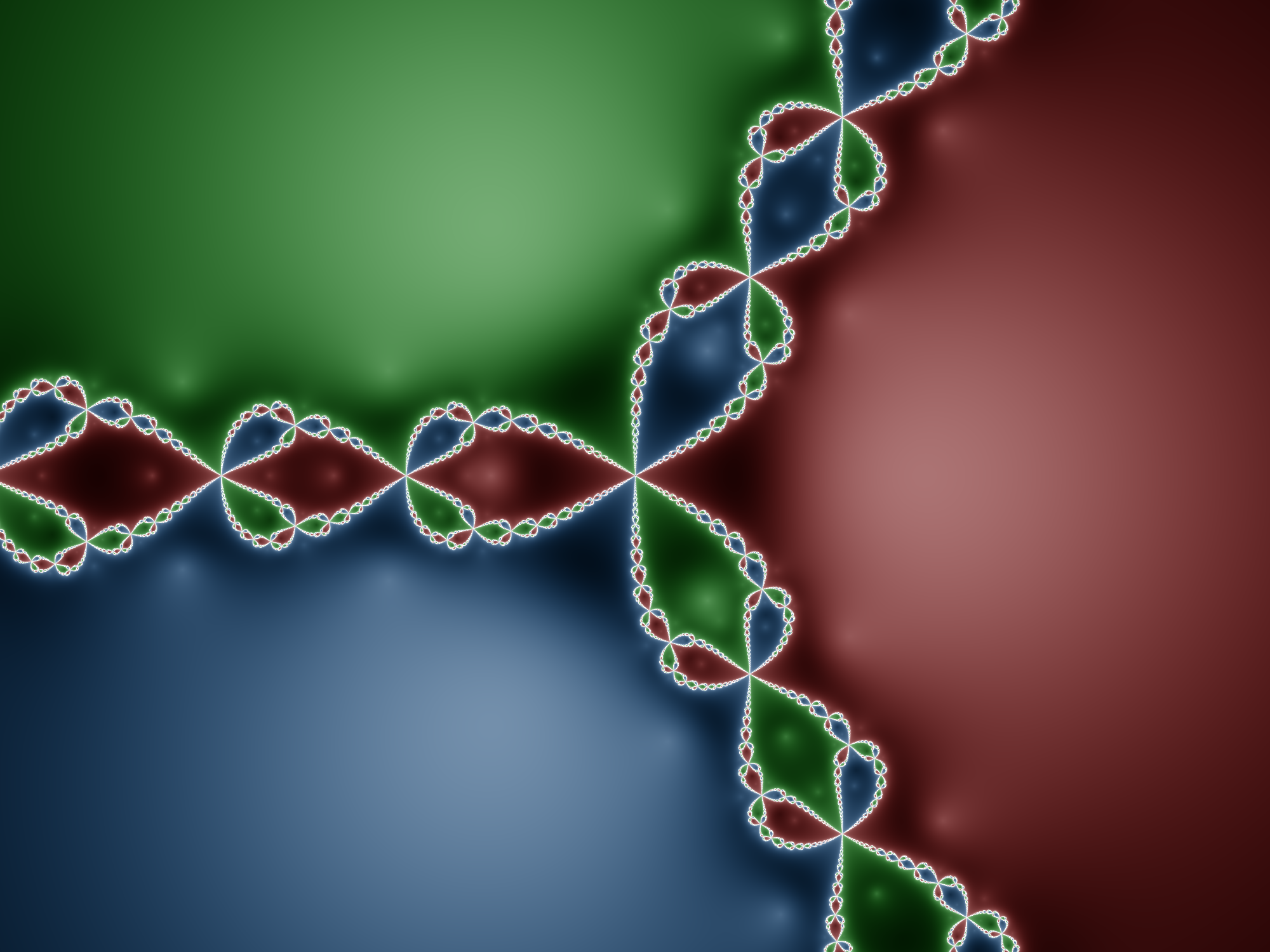
Julia set (white) and Fatou set (dark red/green/blue) for $f: z\mapsto z-\frac{g}{g'}(z)$ with $g: z \mapsto z^3-1$ in the complex plane.

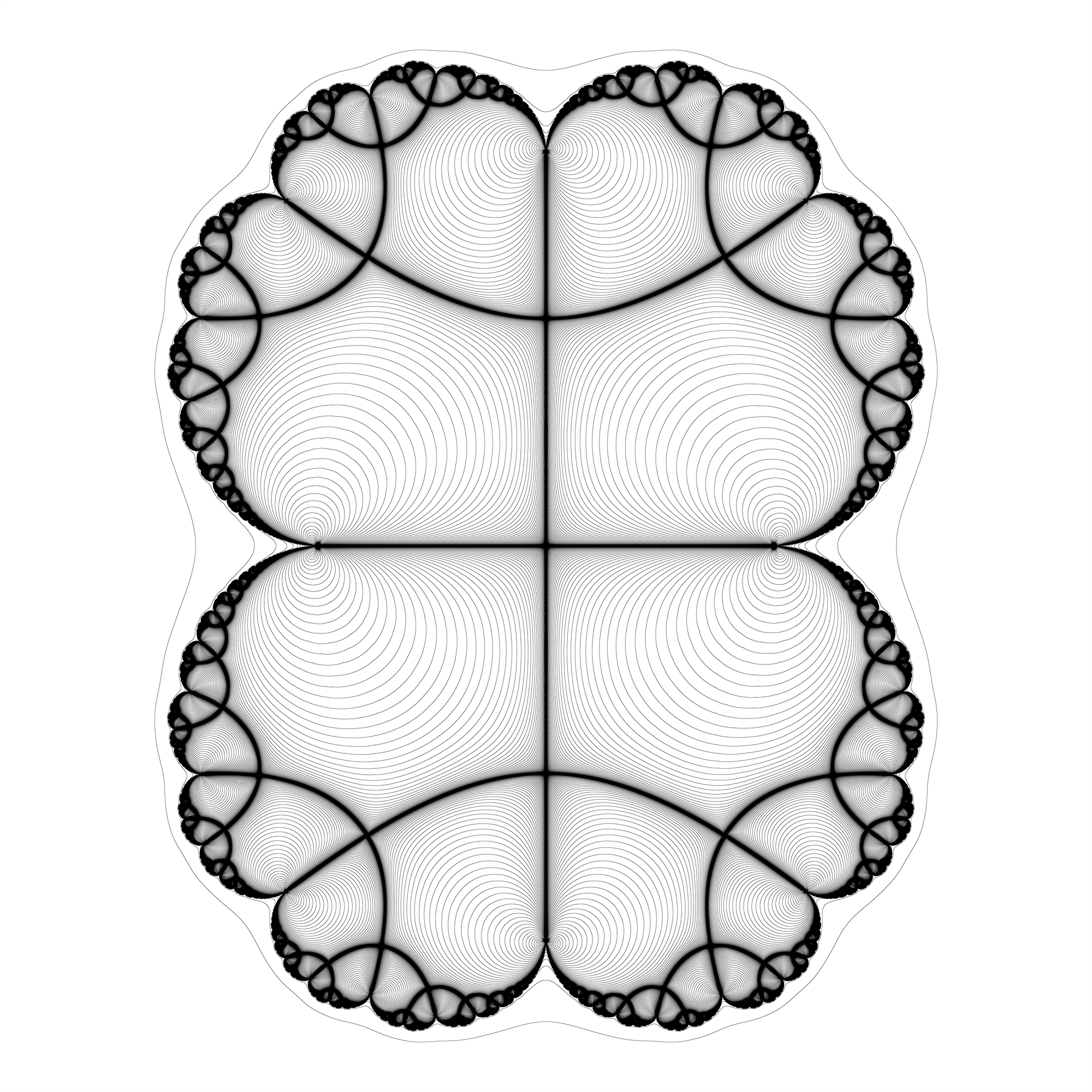
Julia set with parabolic cycle

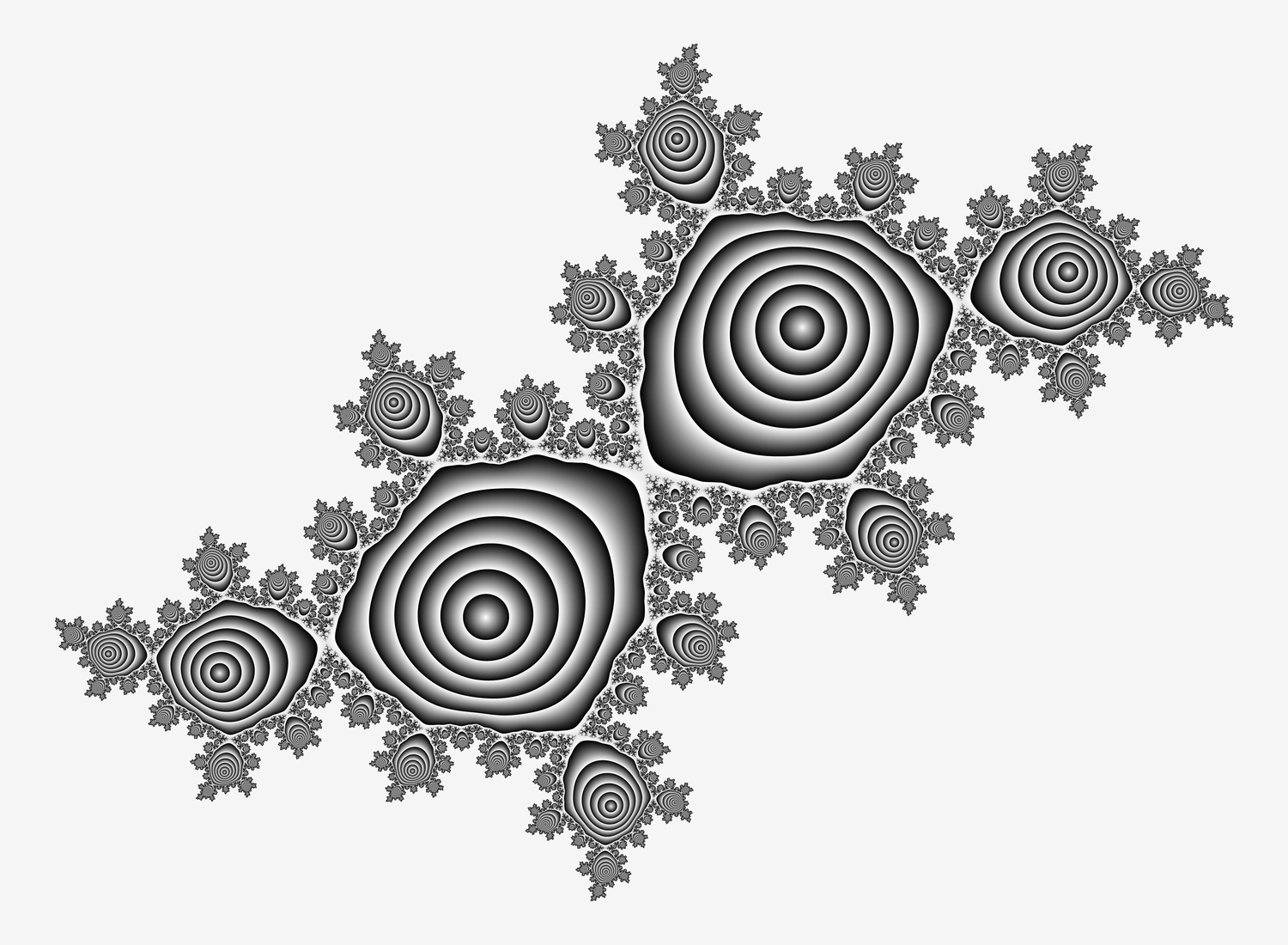
Julia set with Siegel disc (elliptic case)

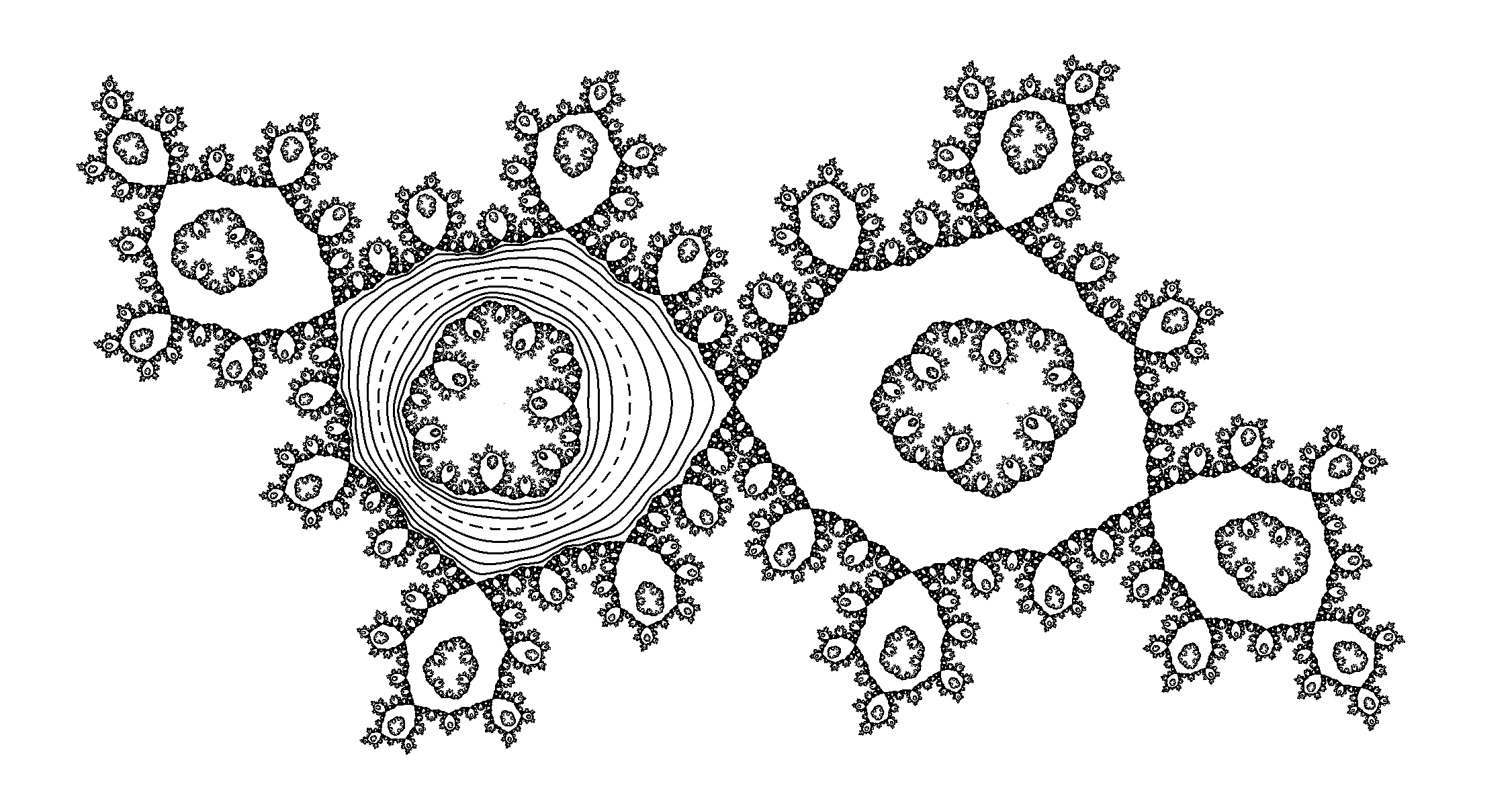
Julia set with Herman ring

=== Attracting periodic point ===
The components of the map $f(z) = z - (z^3-1)/3z^2$ contain the attracting points that are the solutions to $z^3=1$. This is because the map is the one to use for finding solutions to the equation $z^3=1$ by Newton–Raphson formula. The solutions must naturally be attracting fixed points.

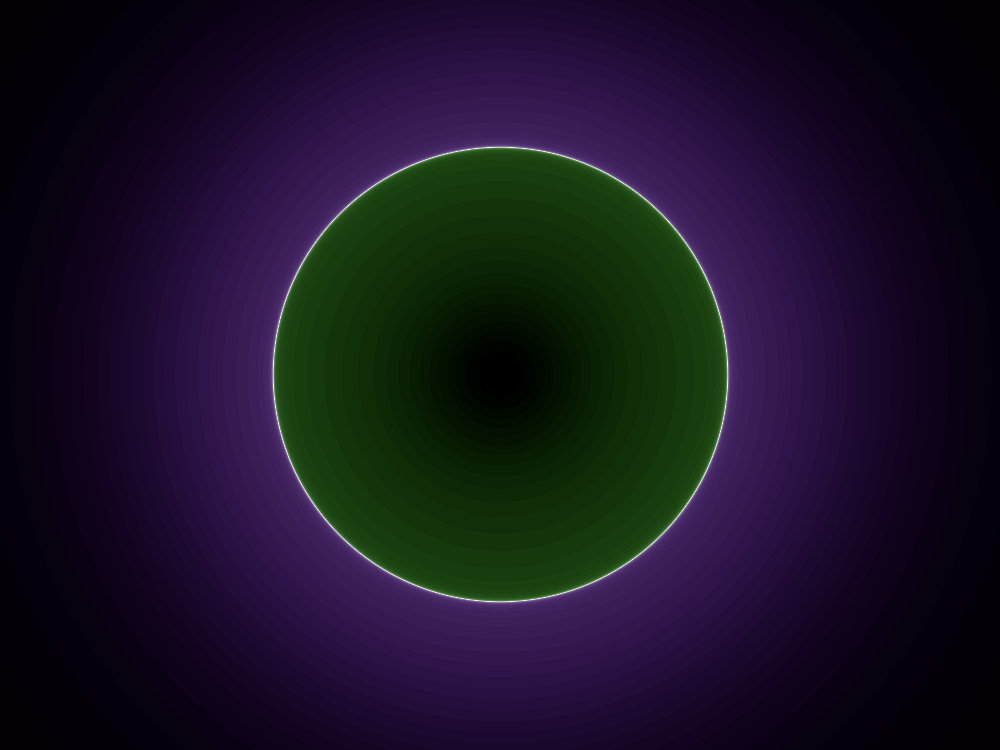
Dynamic plane consist of Fatou 2 superattracting period 1 basins, each has only one component.

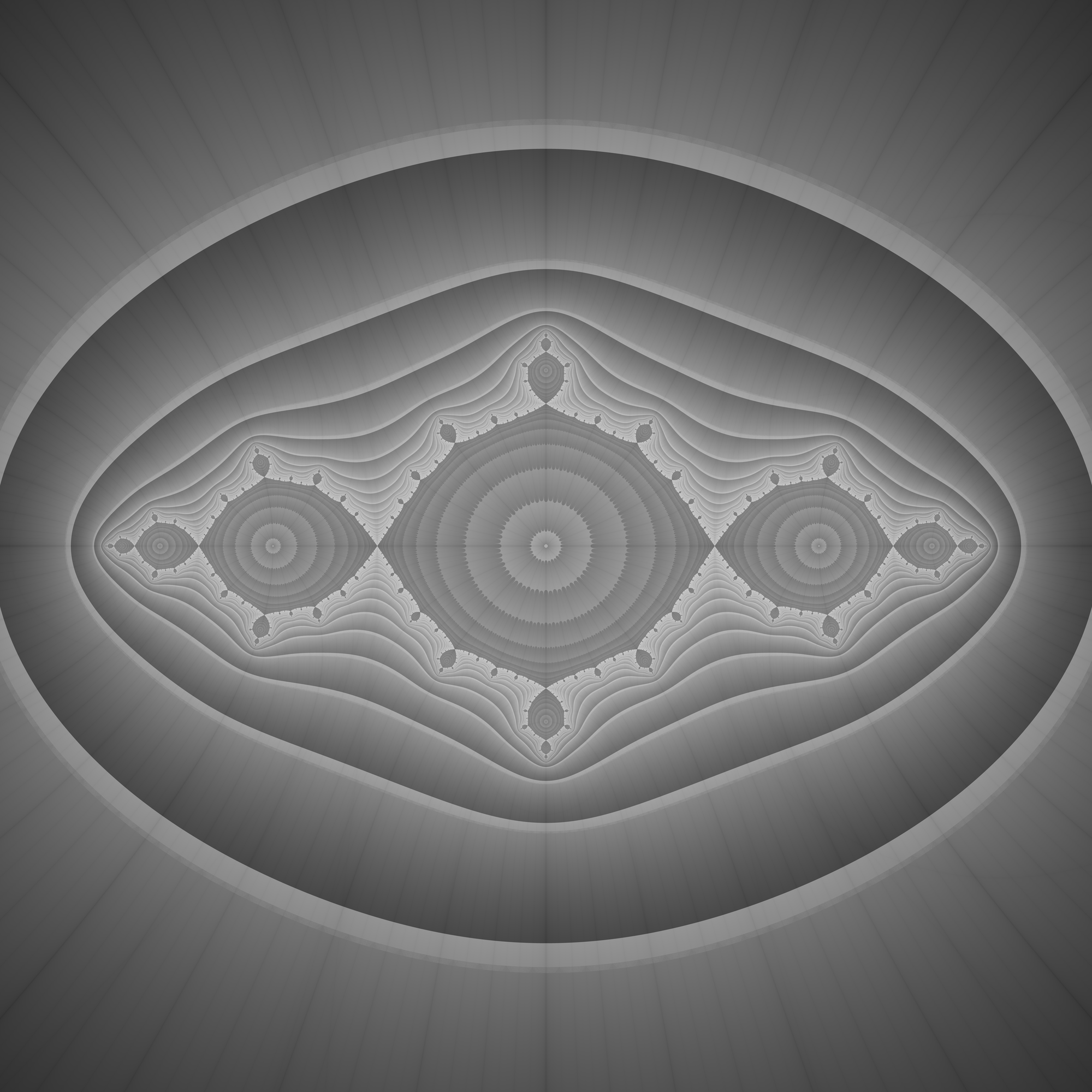
Level curves and rays in superattractive case

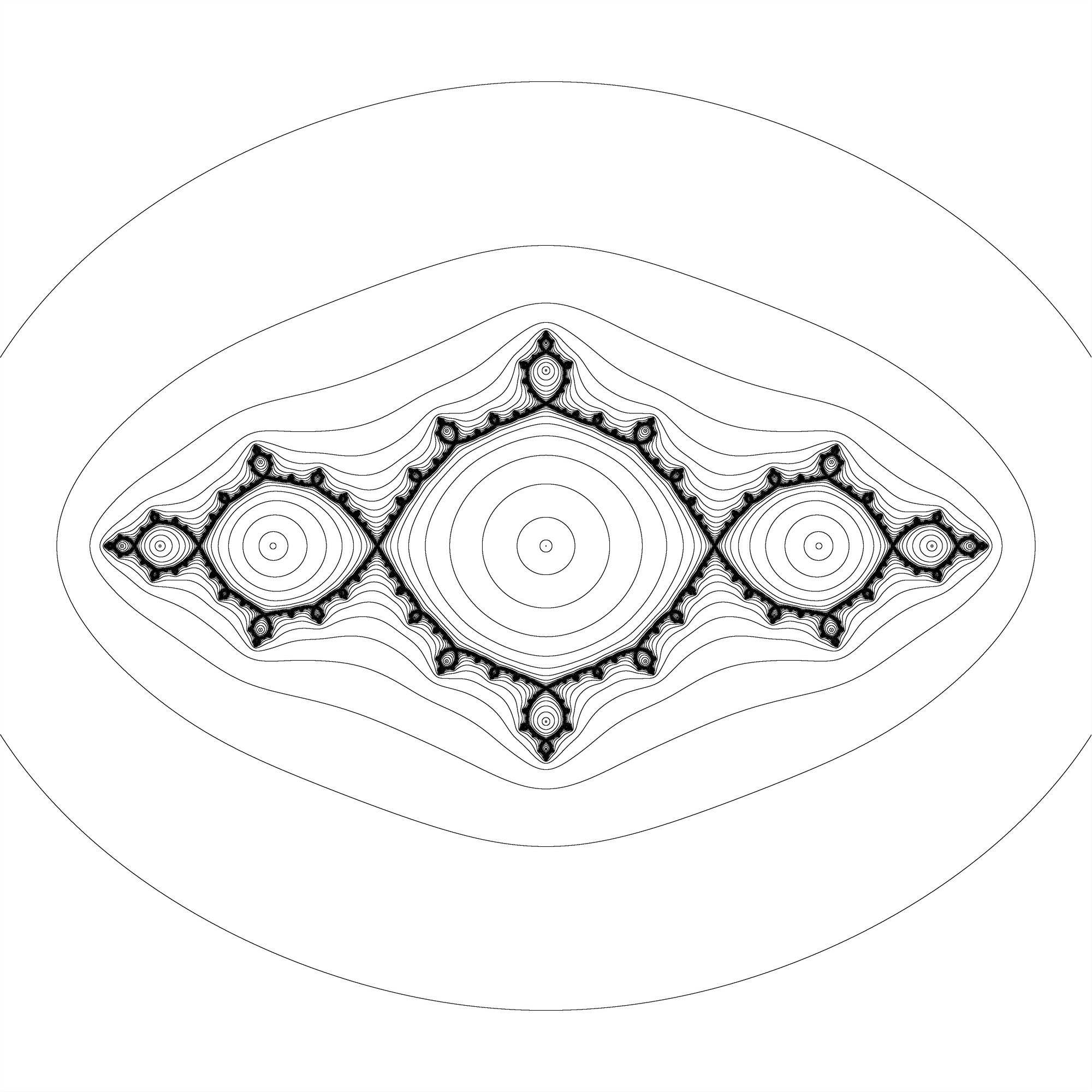
Julia set with superattracting cycles (hyperbolic) in the interior (period 2) and the exterior (period 1)

=== Herman ring ===
The map

$$f(z) = e^{2 \pi i t} z^2(z - 4)/(1 - 4z)$$

and t = 0.6151732... will produce a Herman ring. It is shown by Shishikura that the degree of such map must be at least 3, as in this example.

=== More than one type of component ===
If degree d is greater than 2 then there is more than one critical point and then can be more than one type of component

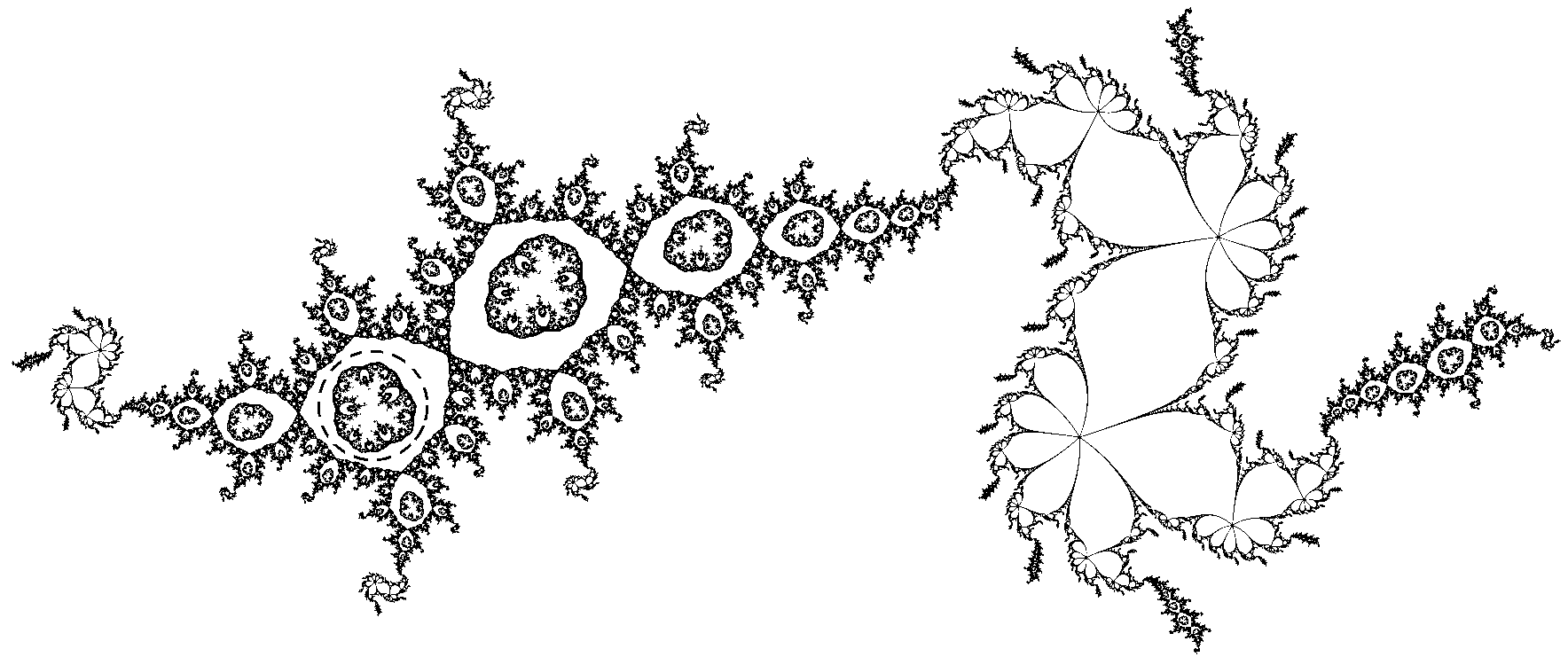
Herman+Parabolic

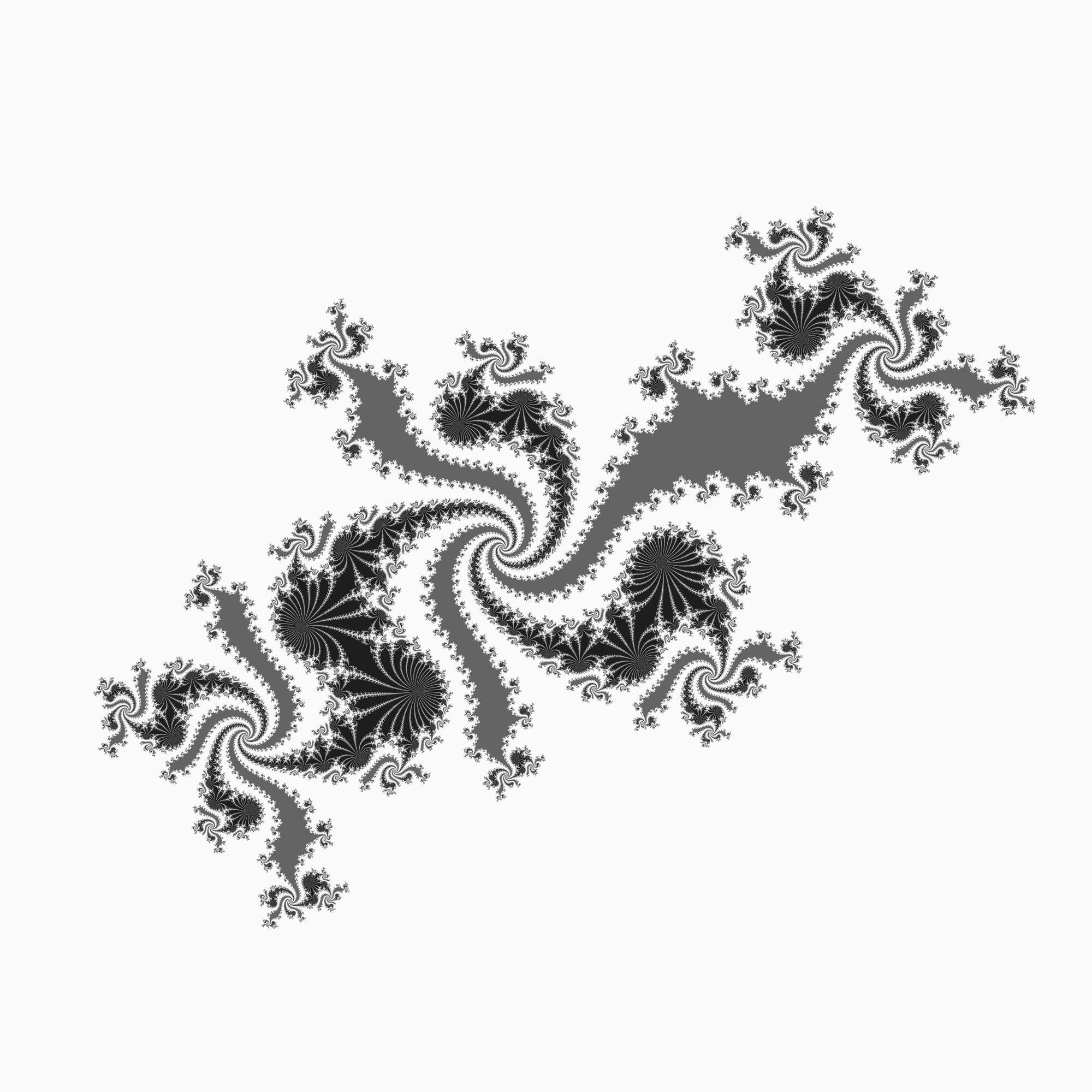
Period 3 and 105

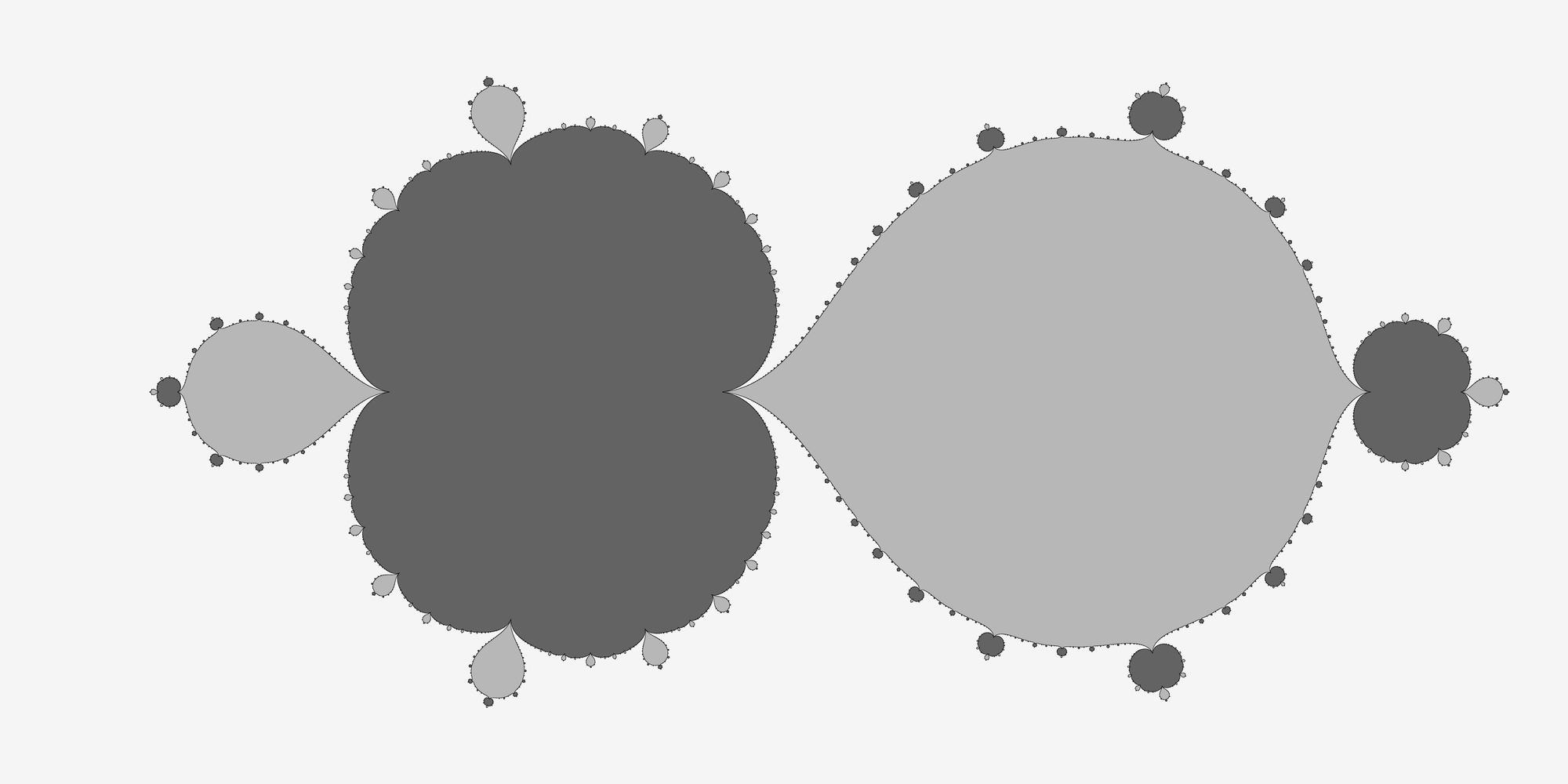
attracting and parabolic

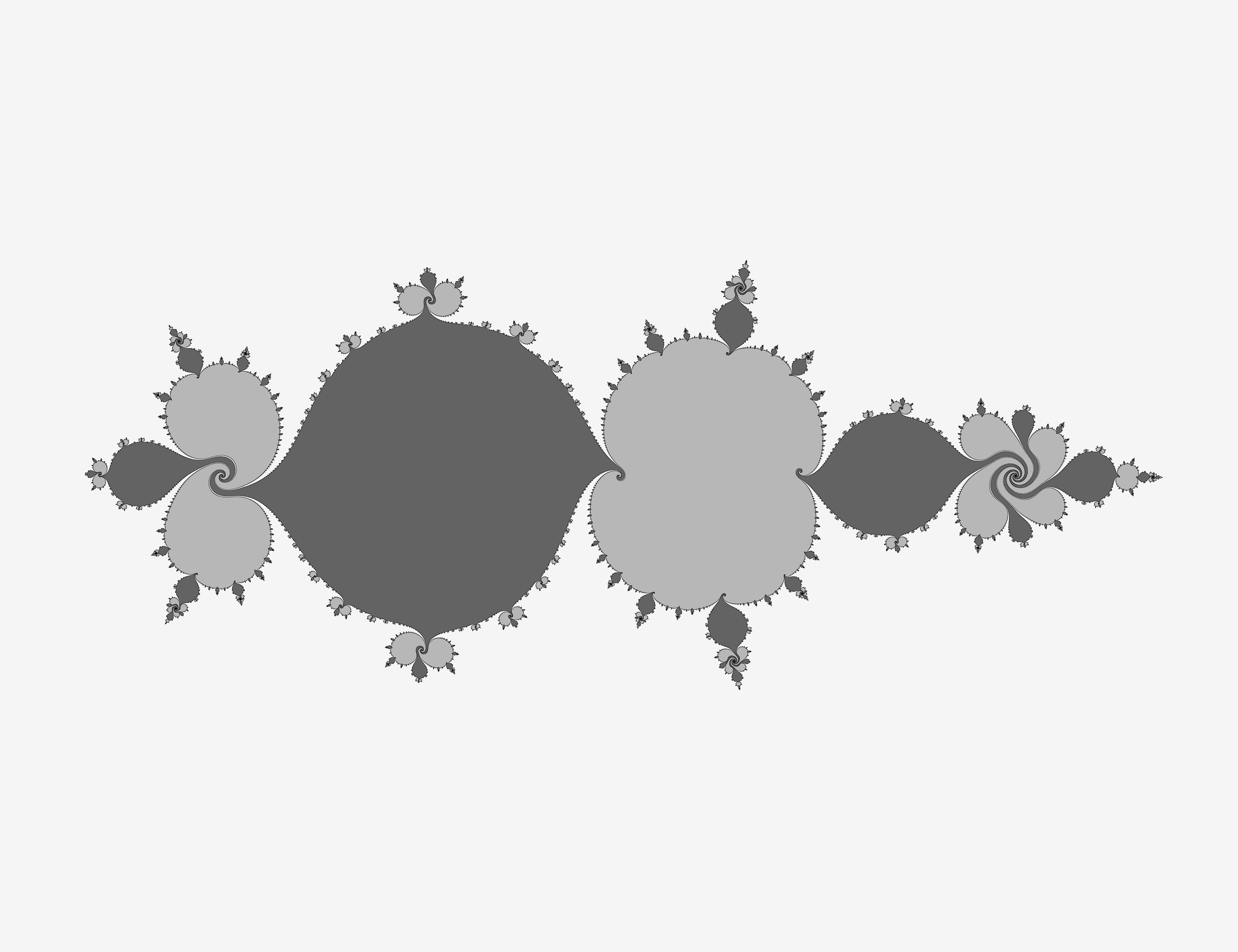
period 1 and period 1

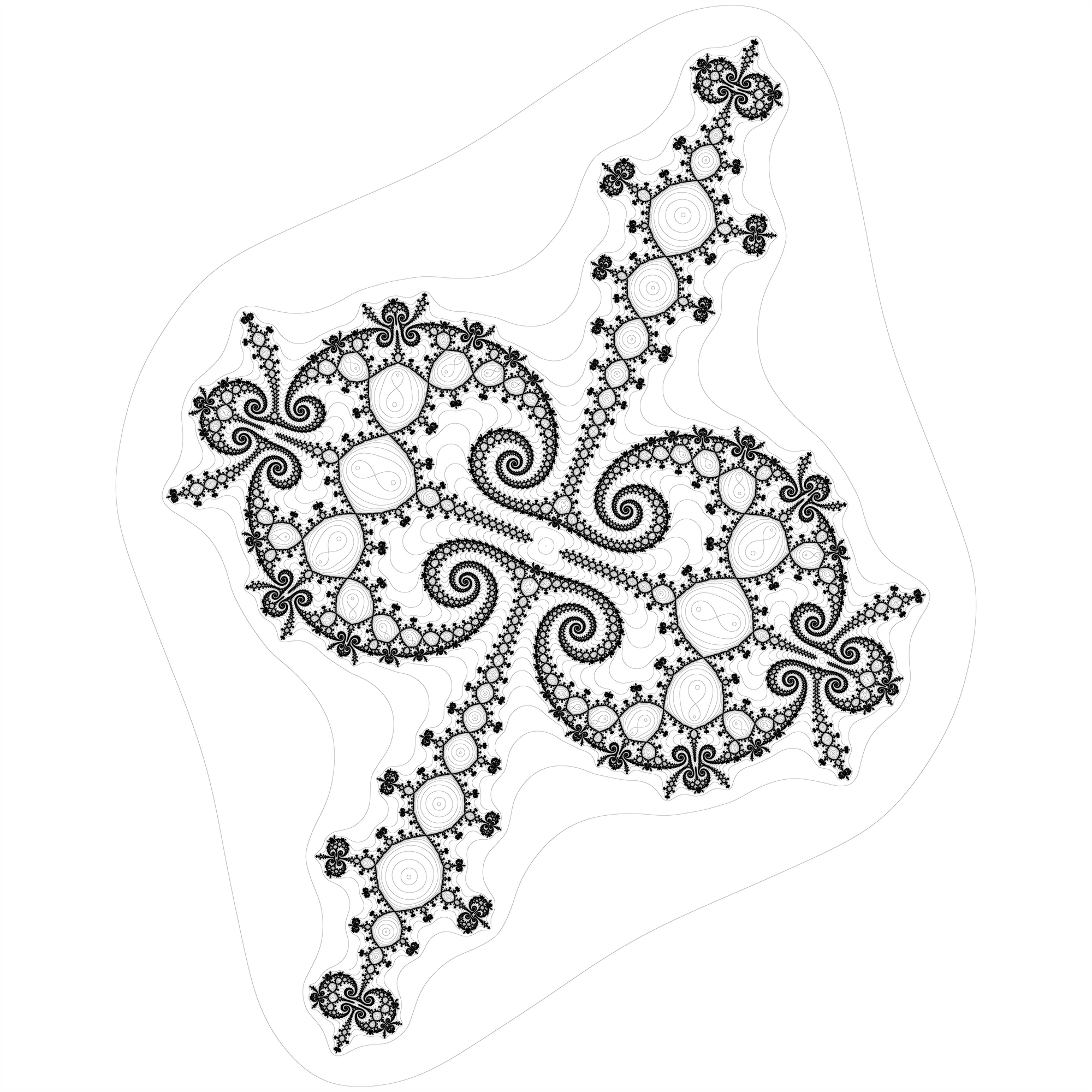
period 4 and 4 (2 attracting basins)

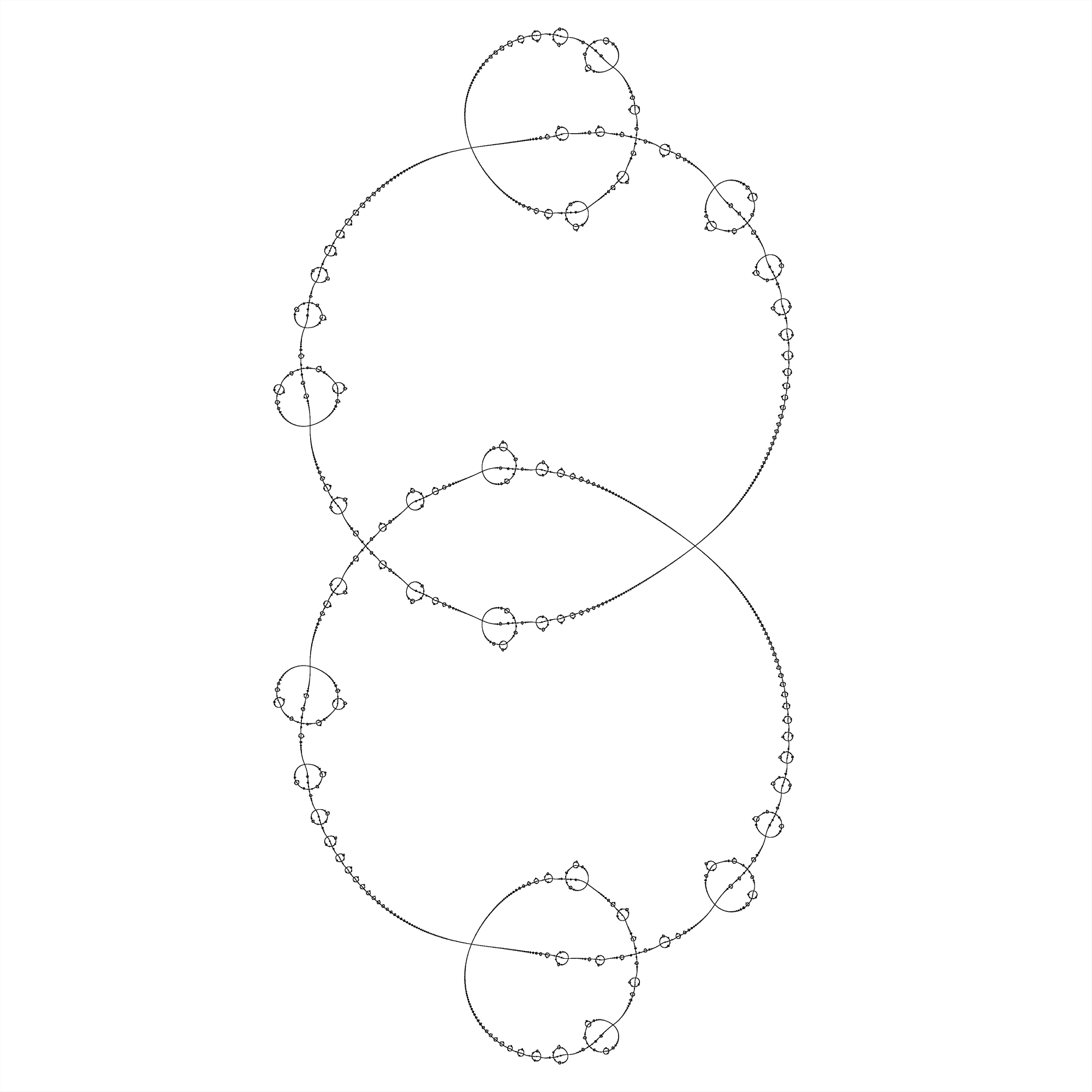
two period 2 basins

== Transcendental case ==
=== Baker domain ===
In case of transcendental functions there is another type of periodic Fatou components, called Baker domain: these are "domains on which the iterates tend to an essential singularity (not possible for polynomials and rational functions)" one example of such a function is:
$$f(z) = z - 1 + (1 - 2z)e^z$$

=== Wandering domain ===
Transcendental maps may have wandering domains: these are Fatou components that are not eventually periodic.

== See also ==
- No-wandering-domain theorem
- Montel's theorem
- John Domains
- Basins of attraction

== Bibliography ==
- Lennart Carleson and Theodore W. Gamelin, Complex Dynamics, Springer 1993.
- Alan F. Beardon Iteration of Rational Functions, Springer 1991.
