= Fatou–Bieberbach domain =

In mathematics, a Fatou–Bieberbach domain is a proper subdomain of $\mathbb{C}^n$, biholomorphically equivalent to $\mathbb{C}^n$. That is, an open set $\Omega \subsetneq \mathbb{C}^n$ is called a Fatou–Bieberbach domain if there exists a biholomorphic function $f:\Omega \rightarrow \mathbb{C}^n$ whose inverse function $f^{-1}:\mathbb{C}^n \rightarrow \Omega$ is holomorphic.

== History ==
As a consequence of the Riemann mapping theorem, there are no Fatou–Bieberbach domains in the case n = 1. Pierre Fatou and Ludwig Bieberbach first explored such domains in higher dimensions in the 1920s, hence the name given to them later. Since the 1980s, Fatou–Bieberbach domains have again become the subject of mathematical research.

== Examples ==
Fatou–Bieberbach domains occur in great numbers for $n\ge 2$.

Let $\operatorname{Aut}\left(\mathbb{C}^n\right)$ denote the group of biholomorphisms of type $\mathbb C^n \to \mathbb C^n$. Basins of attractions produce many FB domains, according to the following theorem.

Theorem ((Rosay & Rudin 1988))—Suppose that $F \in \operatorname{Aut}\left(\mathbb{C}^n\right)$ fixes a point $p \in \mathbb{C}^n$ and that all eigenvalues $\lambda_1, \ldots, \lambda_n$ of $F^{\prime}(p)$ satisfy $\left|\lambda_i\right|<1$. Let $\Omega$ be the set of all $z \in \mathbb{C}^n$ for which $\lim _{k \rightarrow \infty} F^k(z)=p$ where $F^k=F \circ F^{k-1}, F^1=F$. Then there exists a biholomorphic map $\Psi$ from $\Omega$ onto $\mathbb{C}^n$.

- Let $A\in GL(n,\mathbb C)$ with spectral radius $\rho(A)<1$. Set $F(z)=Az$. This is a contraction map with basin $\Omega=\mathbb C^n$.
- In $\mathbb C^2$, let $F_a(z,w)=(\,w+z^2,\ a z\,)$ with $0<|a|<1$. Then $F_a^{-1}(z,w)=(\,w/a,\ z-(w/a)^2\,)$. It has two fixed points: $(0, 0), (1-a, a(1-a))$. The point $p=(0,0)$ is fixed and
  $$F_a'(0)=\begin{pmatrix}0&1\\ a&0\end{pmatrix}$$
  has eigenvalues $\pm\sqrt{a}$. The basin $\Omega=\{(z,w): F_a^k(z,w)\to(0,0)\}$ is a proper open subset of $\mathbb C^2$ and thus a Fatou–Bieberbach domain.
- More generally, for $F(z,w)=(\,w+P(z),\ a z\,)$, where $0<|a|<1$, and $P$ a polynomial with all monomials having degree at least 2. The basin of attraction of $0$ is a Fatou–Bieberbach domain in $\mathbb C^2$. These maps are called complex Hénon maps.

More generally, for any $F \in \operatorname{Aut}\left(\mathbb{C}^n\right)$ and any atttractive fixed point $p$, let $\Omega$ be its basin of attraction. If $\Omega$ is not all of $\mathbb C^n$, then it is a Fatou–Bieberbach domain. It is also a Runge subset. It was an open problem for a long time whether there exists Fatou–Bieberbach domains that are not Runge. This was answered in the affirmative in 2008.

Let $L_1, L_2, \dots$ be countably many complex-affine subspaces of $\mathbb C^n$. There exists a Fatou–Bieberbach domain $\Omega$ such that $L_j \cap \Omega$ is a connected proper subset of $L_j$ for all $j$.

Given countably many closed subvarieties of $\mathbb C^n$. There exists a Fatou–Bieberbach domain $\Omega$ that contains all of them.

The boundary of a Fatou–Bieberbach can be very wild. For any $k \in \{1, 2, \dots, \infty\}$ there exists $k$ disjoint Fatou–Bieberbach domains $\Omega_1, \Omega_2, \dots, \Omega_k$, such that $\forall z \in \mathbb C^n \setminus\cap_{j=1}^k \Omega_j$, $z$ is on the boundary of all $\Omega_j$. Similar to lakes of Wada.

The Andersén–Lempert theorem states that the group generated by shearing maps is dense in $\operatorname{Aut}\left(\mathbb{C}^n\right)$. This allows construction of many Fatou–Bieberbach domains.

== Properties ==
No Fatou–Bieberbach domain is bounded, since a bounded image of an entire map $\mathbb C^n\to\Omega$ would violate Liouville's theorem componentwise.

By the Ax–Grothendieck theorem, if $\Omega$ is Fatou–Bieberbach, then for any biholomorphism $f:\Omega \rightarrow \mathbb{C}^n$, $f^{-1}$ is not a polynomial.

Biholomorphism preserves Fatou–Bieberbach domains. That is, if $\Psi\in\operatorname{Aut}(\mathbb C^n)$ and $\Omega$ is Fatou–Bieberbach, then $\Psi(\Omega)$ is Fatou–Bieberbach.

In one dimension, there are no Fatou–Bieberbach domains, due to Picard's great theorem.

Proof

Let $\Omega\subset\mathbb C$ be open, and $\phi:\Omega\to\mathbb C$ be biholomorphic. Then $F=\phi^{-1}:\mathbb C\to\Omega$ is entire and injective. If $\infty$ were an essential singularity of $F$, Picard implies $F$ is dense near every value with at most one exception, contradicting injectivity. Hence $\infty$ is a pole or removable, so $F$ is polynomial. Since it is injective, it must be affine $F(z)=az+b$ with $a \neq 0$, so $\Omega = \mathbb C$.

Being biholomorphic to $\mathbb C^n$, every Fatou–Bieberbach domain is a Stein manifold and a domain of holomorphy.

For any $\Omega \subset \mathbb C^n$ that is both Runge and Fatou–Bieberbach, for any $p \in \Omega$, there exists a sequence of biholomorphisms $f_1, f_2, \dots : \mathbb C^n \to \mathbb C^n$ such that they all fix $p$, and $\Omega = \{z \in \mathbb C^n : \lim_{k \to \infty} f_k \circ\cdots \circ f_1 (z) = p\}$

== See also ==
- Stein manifold
- Andersén–Lempert theory
