= Shen Weixiao =

Chinese mathematician

Shen Weixiao (Chinese: 沈维孝; pinyin: Shěn Wéixiào; born May 1975 in Guichi, Anhui, China) is a Chinese mathematician, specializing in dynamical systems (in particular, real and complex one-dimensional dynamics).

Shen graduated from the University of Science and Technology of China in 1995. He received his Ph.D. from the University of Tokyo in 2001 with thesis On the metric property of multimodal interval maps and density of axiom A under the supervision of Mitsuhiro Shishikura. Shen was previously a professor at the National University of Singapore. He is currently a professor at Fudan University.

He published, with Oleg Kozlovski and Sebastian van Strien, a solution of the 2nd part of the 11th problem of Smale's problems.

In 2009 Shen was one of the two winners of the Chern Award of the Chinese Mathematical Society. In 2014 Shen was an invited speaker, with Sebastian van Strien, at the International Congress of Mathematicians in Seoul.

== Selected publications ==
- Shen, Weixiao (2000). "On the qc rigidity of real polynomials (Comprehensive Research on Complex Dynamical Systems and Related Fields)" (PDF). 数理解析研究所講究録 (Mathematical Analysis Workshop Proceedings). 1153. Kyoto University: 41–58.
- Shen, Weixiao (2003). "On the measurable dynamics of real rational functions" (PDF). Ergodic Theory and Dynamical Systems. 23 (3): 957–983. doi:10.1017/S0143385702001311. S2CID 55697411.
- Bruin, Henk; Shen, Weixiao; Strien, Sebastian van (2003). "Invariant Measures Exist Without a Growth Condition" (PDF). Communications in Mathematical Physics. 241 (2–3): 287–306. Bibcode:2003CMaPh.241..287B. doi:10.1007/s00220-003-0928-z. S2CID 122405994.
- Shen, Weixiao (2004). "On the metric properties of multimodal interval maps and $C$^{2} density of Axiom A". Inventiones Mathematicae. 156 (2): 301–403. Bibcode:2004InMat.156..301S. doi:10.1007/s00222-003-0343-2. ISSN 0020-9910. S2CID 120159228. (See Axiom A.)
- Shen, Weixiao (2006). "Decay of Geometry for Unimodal Maps: An Elementary Proof". Annals of Mathematics. 163 (2): 383–404. doi:10.4007/annals.2006.163.383. JSTOR 20159962.
- Kozlovski, Oleg; Shen, Weixiao; Van Strien, Sebastian (2007). "Rigidity for real polynomials". Annals of Mathematics. 165 (3): 749–841. doi:10.4007/annals.2007.165.749.
- Bruin, Henk; Rivera-Letelier, Juan; Shen, Weixiao; Van Strien, Sebastian (2008). "Large derivatives, backward contraction and invariant densities for interval maps" (PDF). Inventiones Mathematicae. 172 (3): 509–533. Bibcode:2008InMat.172..509B. doi:10.1007/s00222-007-0108-4. hdl:10044/1/18335. S2CID 2820020.
- Avila, Artur; Lyubich, Mikhail; Shen, Weixiao (2008). "Parapuzzle of the Multibrot set and typical dynamics of unimodal maps". arXiv:0804.2197 [math.DS].
- Avila, Artur; Kahn, Jeremy; Lyubich, Mikhail; Shen, Weixiao (2009). "Combinatorial rigidity for unicritical polynomials". Annals of Mathematics. 170 (2): 783–797. arXiv:math/0507240. doi:10.4007/annals.2009.170.783. JSTOR 25662159.
- Shen, Weixiao (2013). "On stochastic stability of non-uniformly expanding interval maps". Proceedings of the London Mathematical Society. 107 (5): 1091–1134. arXiv:1107.2537. doi:10.1112/plms/pdt013. S2CID 119428557.
- Shen, Weixiao; Van Strien, Sebastian (2013). "On stochastic stability of expanding circle maps with neutral fixed points". Dynamical Systems. 28 (3): 423–452. arXiv:1212.5671. doi:10.1080/14689367.2013.806733. S2CID 119134579.
- Gao, Bing; Shen, Weixiao (2014). "Summability implies Collet–Eckmann almost surely". Ergodic Theory and Dynamical Systems. 34 (4): 1184–1209. arXiv:1111.3720. doi:10.1017/etds.2012.173. S2CID 119263318.
- Rivera-Letelier, J.; Shen, W (2014). "Statistical properties of one-dimensional maps under weak hyperbolicity assumptions" (PDF). Ann. Sci. Éc. Norm. Supér. 47 (6): 1027–1083. doi:10.24033/asens.2233. S2CID 204938726.
- Shen, Weixiao (2018). "Hausdorff dimension of the graphs of the classical Weierstrass functions". Mathematische Zeitschrift. 289 (1–2): 223–266. arXiv:1505.03986. doi:10.1007/s00209-017-1949-1. S2CID 118844077.
