= Fatou conjecture =

In mathematics, the Fatou conjecture, named after Pierre Fatou, states that a quadratic family of maps from the complex plane to itself is hyperbolic for an open dense set of parameters.
