= Pierre Fatou =

French mathematician (1878–1929)

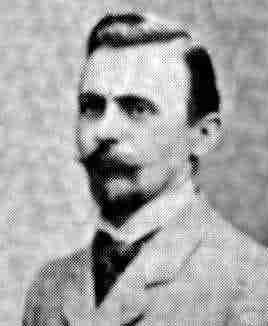
- Born: 28 February 1878; Lorient, France
- Died: 9 August 1929 (aged 51); Pornichet, France
- Education: École Normale Supérieure
- Known for: Fatou lemma; Fatou set; Fatou–Bieberbach domain
- Scientific career
- Fields: Mathematics
- Workplaces: Paris Observatory
- Thesis: Séries trigonométriques et séries de Taylor (1906)
- Doctoral advisor: Paul Painlevé

Pierre Joseph Louis Fatou (28 February 1878 – 9 August 1929) was a French mathematician and astronomer. He is known for major contributions to several branches of analysis. The Fatou lemma and the Fatou set are named after him.

== Biography ==
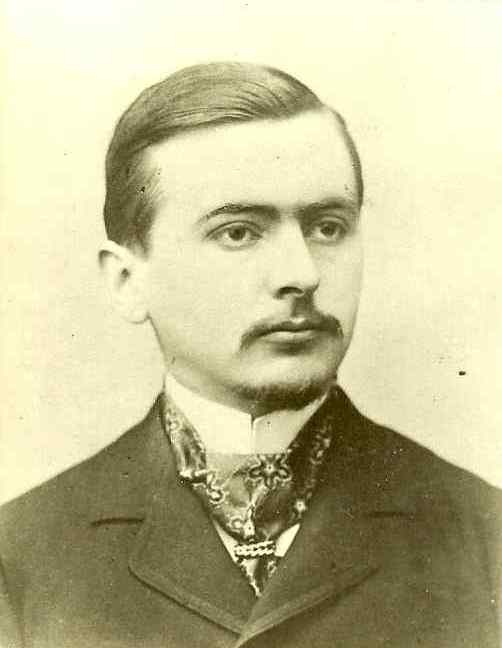
Pierre Fatou

Pierre Fatou's parents were Prosper Ernest Fatou (1832–1891) and Louise Eulalie Courbet (1844–1911), both of whom were in the military. Pierre's family would have liked for him to enter the military as well, but his health was not sufficiently good for him to pursue a military career.

Fatou entered the École Normale Supérieure in Paris in 1898 to study mathematics and graduated in 1901 when he was appointed an intern (stagiaire) in the Paris Observatory. Fatou was promoted to assistant astronomer in 1904 and to astronomer (astronome titulaire) in 1928. He worked in this observatory until his death.

Fatou was awarded the Becquerel prize in 1918; he was a knight of the Legion of Honour (1923). He was the president of the French mathematical society in 1927.

He was in friendly relations with several contemporary French mathematicians, especially, Maurice René Fréchet and Paul Montel.

In the summer of 1929 Fatou went on holiday to Pornichet, a seaside town to the west of Nantes. He was staying in Le Brise-Lames Villa near the port and it was there at 8 p.m. on Friday 9 August that he died in his room. No cause of death was given on the death certificate but Audin argues that he died as a result of a stomach ulcer that burst. Fatou's nephew Robert Fatou wrote:

Having never thought it useful during his life to consult a doctor, my dear uncle died suddenly in a hotel room in Pornichet.

—

Fatou's funeral was held on 14 August in the church of Saint-Louis, and he was buried in the Carnel Cemetery in Lorient.

== Mathematical work ==
Fatou's work had a very large influence on the development of analysis in the 20th century.

Fatou's PhD thesis Séries trigonométriques et séries de Taylor (Fatou 1906) was the first application of the Lebesgue integral to concrete problems of analysis, mainly to the study of analytic and harmonic functions in the unit disc. In this work, Fatou studied for the first time the Poisson integral of an arbitrary measure on the unit circle. This work of Fatou is influenced by Henri Lebesgue who invented his integral in 1901.

The Fatou theorem, which says that a bounded analytic function in the unit disc has radial limits almost everywhere on the unit circle was published in 1906 (Fatou 1906). This theorem was at the origin of a large body of research in 20th-century mathematics under the name of bounded analytic functions. See also the Wikipedia article on functions of bounded type.

A number of fundamental results on the analytic continuation of a Taylor series belong to Fatou.

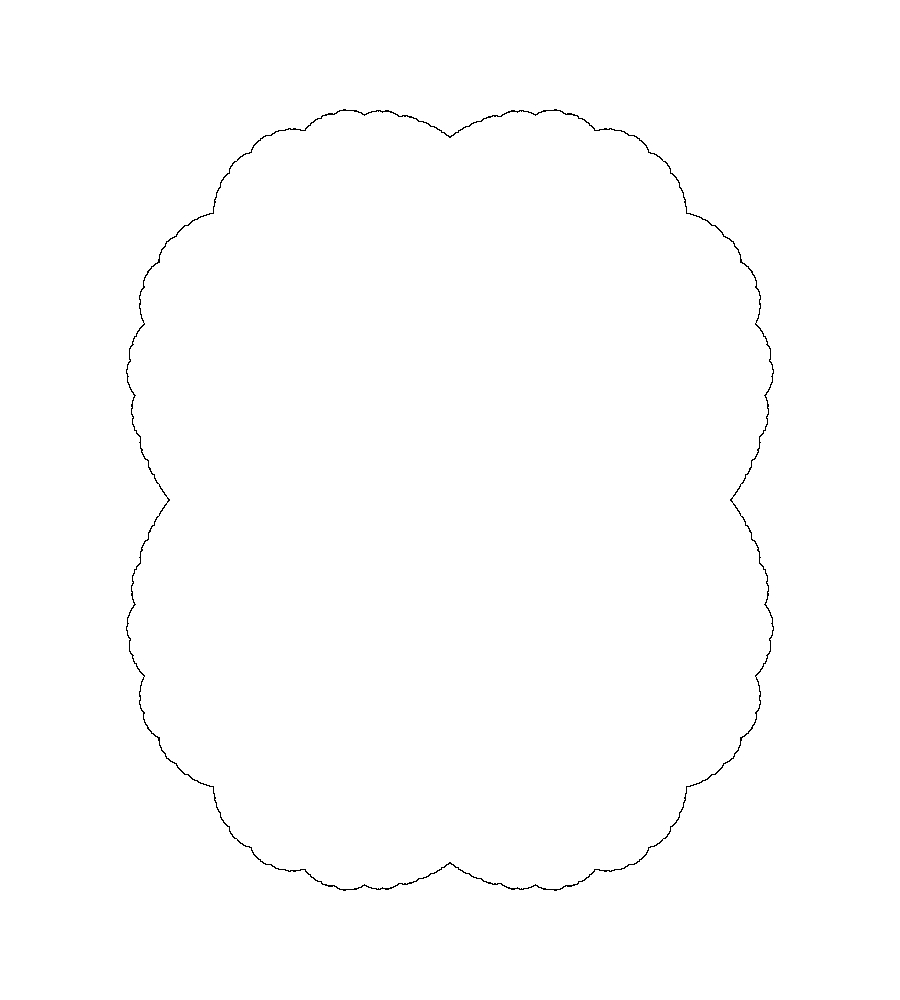
Julia set of $\tfrac12(z+z^2)$ investigated by Fatou in 1906. This picture is made with a modern computer.

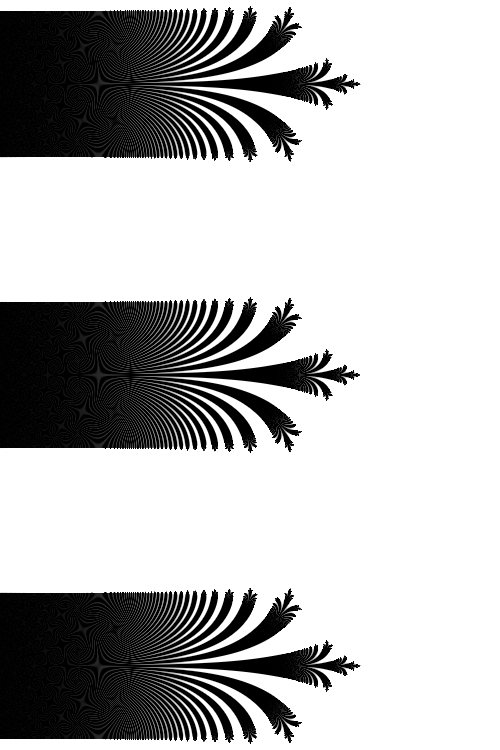
Julia set of z+1+e^{−z} investigated by Fatou in 1926

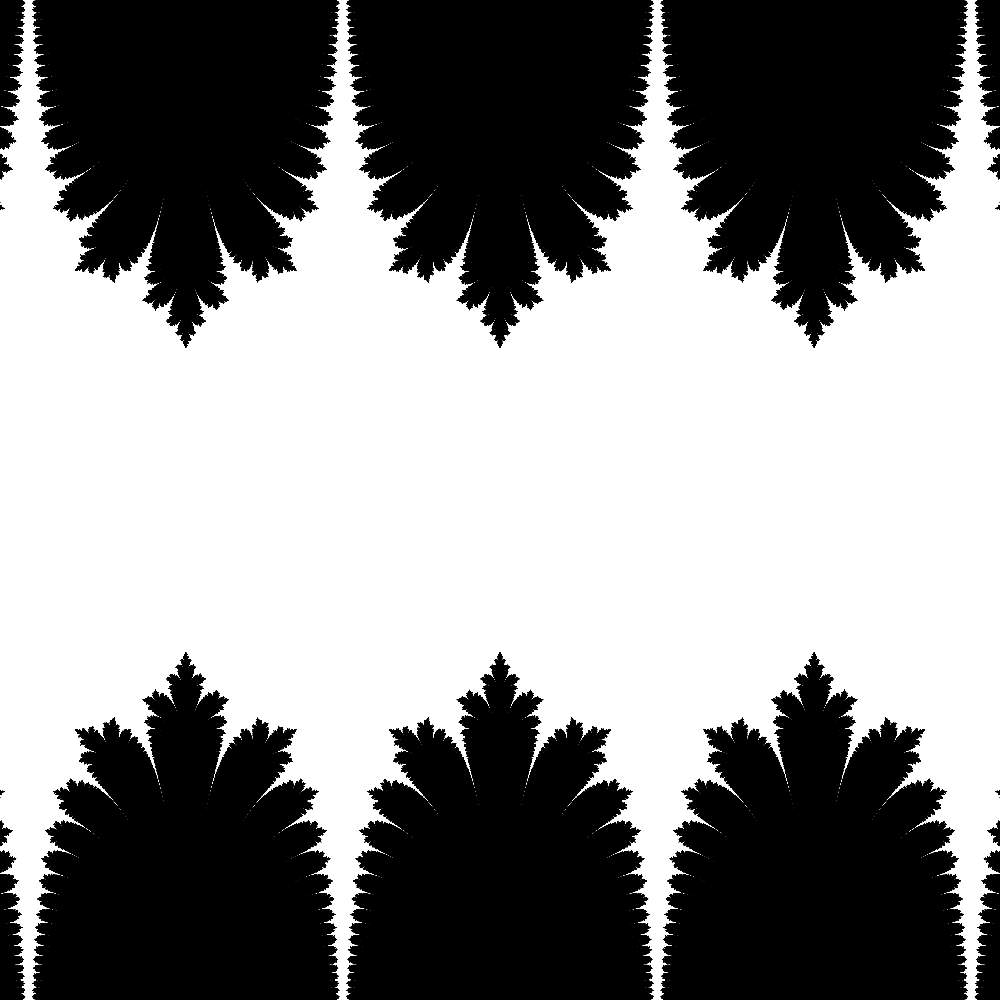
Julia set of a sine function studied by Fatou in 1926

In 1917–1920 Fatou created the area of mathematics which is called holomorphic dynamics (Fatou 1919, 1920, 1920b). It deals with a global study of iteration of analytic functions. He was the first to introduce and study the set which is called now the Julia set. (The complement of this set is sometimes called the Fatou set). Some of the basic results of holomorphic dynamics were also independently obtained by Gaston Julia and Samuel Lattes in 1918. Holomorphic dynamics has experienced a strong revival since 1982 because of the new discoveries of Dennis Sullivan, Adrien Douady, John Hubbard and others. In 1926, Fatou pioneered the study of dynamics of transcendental entire functions (Fatou 1926), a subject which is intensively developing at this time.

As a byproduct of his studies in holomorphic dynamics, Fatou discovered what are now called Fatou–Bieberbach domains (Fatou 1922). These are proper subregions of the complex space of dimension n, which are biholomorphically equivalent to the whole space. (Such regions cannot exist for n=1.)

Fatou did important work in celestial mechanics. He was the first to prove rigorously a theorem (conjectured by Gauss) on the averaging of a perturbation produced by a periodic force of short period (Fatou 1928). This work was continued by Leonid Mandelstam and Nikolay Bogolyubov and his students and developed into a large area of modern applied mathematics. Fatou's other research in celestial mechanics includes a study of the movement of a planet in a resisting medium.(Fatou 1923b)

== Selected publications ==
- Fatou, P. (1906). "Séries trigonométriques et séries de Taylor". Acta Mathematica. 30: 335–400. doi:10.1007/BF02418579. JFM 37.0283.01.
- Fatou, P. (1919). "Sur les équations fonctionnelles, I". Bulletin de la Société Mathématique de France. 47: 161–271. doi:10.24033/bsmf.998. JFM 47.0921.02.; Fatou, P. (1920). "Sur les équations fonctionnelles, II". Bulletin de la Société Mathématique de France. 48: 33–94. doi:10.24033/bsmf.1003. JFM 47.0921.02.; Fatou, P. (1920b). "Sur les équations fonctionnelles, III". Bulletin de la Société Mathématique de France. 48: 208–314. doi:10.24033/bsmf.1008. JFM 47.0921.02.
- Fatou, P. (1922). "Sur les fonctions méromorphes de deux variables". Comptes Rendus Hebdomadaires des Séances de l'Académie des Sciences. 175: 862–865. JFM 48.0391.03.
- Fatou, P. (1923). "Sur les fonctions holomorphes et bornées à l'intérieur d'un cercle". Bulletin de la Société Mathématique de France. 51: 191–202. doi:10.24033/bsmf.1033.
- Fatou, P. (1923b). "Sur le mouvement d'une planète dans un milieu résistant". Bulletin des Sciences Mathématiques. 47: 19–40.
- Fatou, P. (1926). "Sur l'itération des fonctions transcendantes entières". Acta Mathematica. 47 (4): 337–370. doi:10.1007/BF02559517.
- Fatou, P. (1928). "Sur le mouvement d'un système soumis à des forces à courte période". Bulletin de la Société Mathématique de France. 56: 98–139. doi:10.24033/bsmf.1131. JFM 54.0834.01.
- Fatou, Pierre (1907). Séries trigonométriques et séries de Taylor (Doctoral thesis).

== See also ==
- Fatou conjecture
- Fatou's theorem
- Fatou set
- Fatou–Lebesgue theorem (same as Fatou's lemma)
- Classification of Fatou components
- Fatou–Bieberbach domain
- Holomorphic dynamics
