= Siegel disc =

A Siegel disc or Siegel disk is a connected component in the Fatou set where the dynamics is analytically conjugate to an irrational rotation.

== Description ==
Given a holomorphic endomorphism $f:S\to S$ on a Riemann surface $S$ we consider the dynamical system generated by the iterates of $f$ denoted by $f^n=f\circ\stackrel{\left(n\right)}{\cdots}\circ f$. We then call the orbit $\mathcal{O}^+(z_0)$ of $z_0$ as the set of forward iterates of $z_0$. We are interested in the asymptotic behavior of the orbits in $S$ (which will usually be $\mathbb{C}$, the complex plane or $\mathbb{\hat C}=\mathbb{C}\cup\{\infty\}$, the Riemann sphere), and we call $S$ the phase plane or dynamical plane.

One possible asymptotic behavior for a point $z_0$ is to be a fixed point, or in general a periodic point. In this last case $f^p(z_0)=z_0$ where $p$ is the period and $p=1$ means $z_0$ is a fixed point. We can then define the multiplier of the orbit as $\rho=(f^p)'(z_0)$ and this enables us to classify periodic orbits as attracting if $|\rho|<1$ superattracting if $|\rho|=0$), repelling if $|\rho|>1$ and indifferent if $|\rho|=1$. Indifferent periodic orbits can be either rationally indifferent or irrationally indifferent, depending on whether $\rho^n=1$ for some $n\in\mathbb{Z}$ or $\rho^n\neq1$ for all $n\in\mathbb{Z}$, respectively.

Siegel discs are one of the possible cases of connected components in the Fatou set (the complementary set of the Julia set), according to Classification of Fatou components, and can occur around irrationally indifferent periodic points. The Fatou set is, roughly, the set of points where the iterates behave similarly to their neighbours (they form a normal family). Siegel discs correspond to points where the dynamics of $f$ are analytically conjugate to an irrational rotation of the complex unit disc.

== Name ==
The Siegel disc is named in honor of Carl Ludwig Siegel.

== Gallery ==
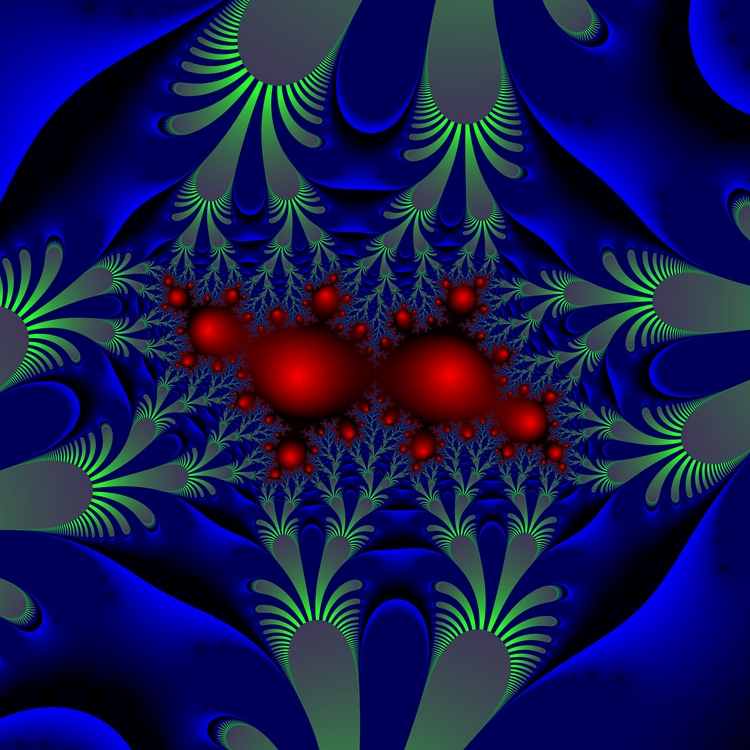
Siegel disc for a polynomial-like mapping

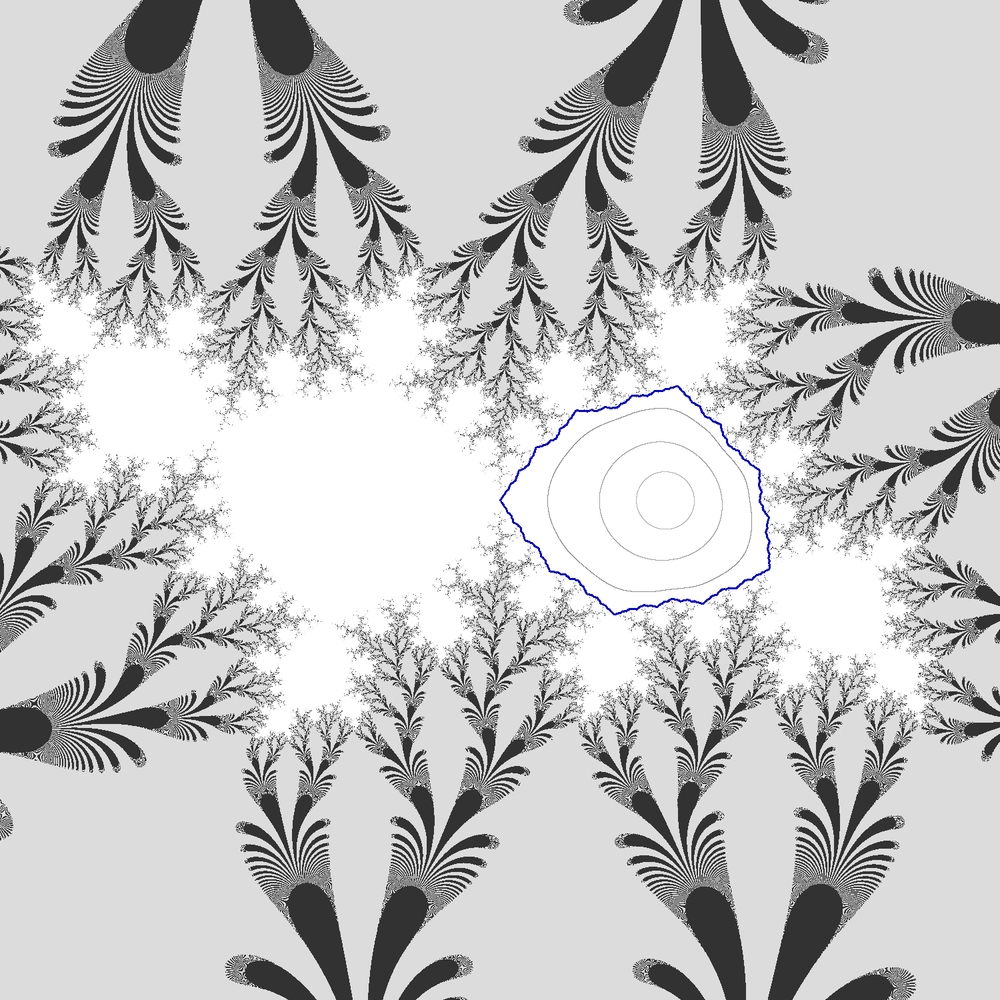
Julia set for $B(z)=\lambda a(e^{z/a}(z+1-a)+a-1)$, where $a=15-15i$ and $\lambda$ is the golden ratio. Orbits of some points inside the Siegel disc emphasized

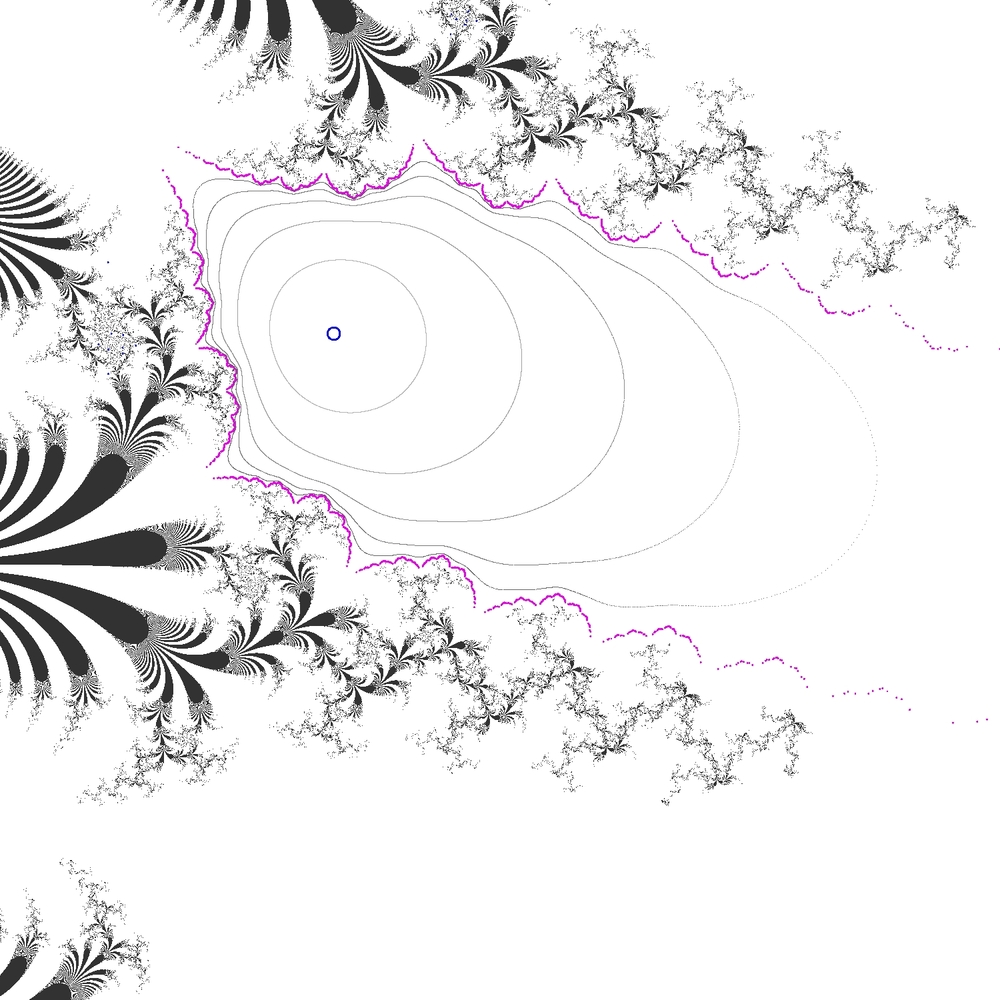
Julia set for $B(z)=\lambda a(e^{z/a}(z+1-a)+a-1)$, where $a=-0.33258+0.10324i$ and $\lambda$ is the golden ratio. Orbits of some points inside the Siegel disc emphasized. The Siegel disc is either unbounded or its boundary is an indecomposable continuum.

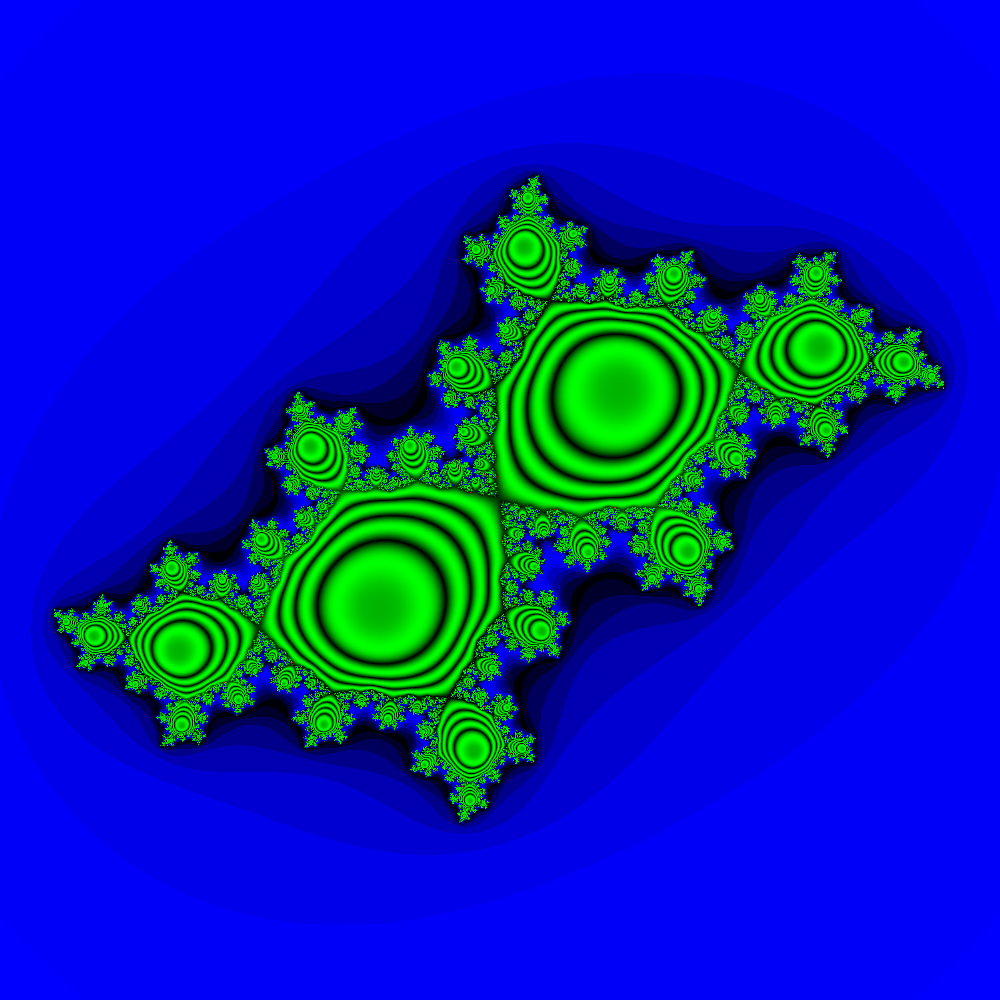
Filled Julia set for $f_c(z) = z*z + c$ for Golden Mean rotation number with interior colored proportional to the average discrete velocity on the orbit = abs( z_(n+1) - z_n ). Note that there is only one Siegel disc and many preimages of the orbits within the Siegel disk

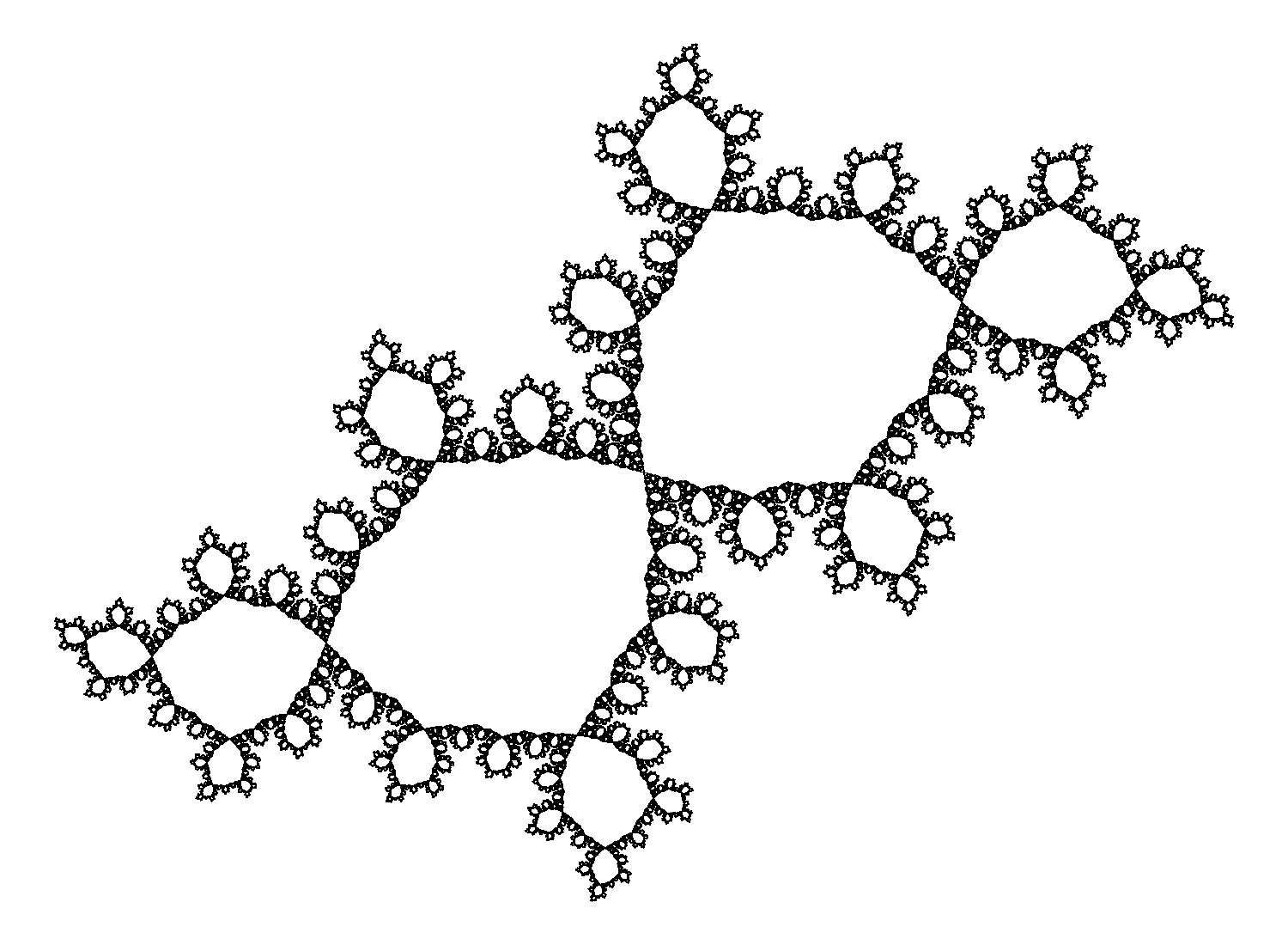

Infolding Siegel disc near 1/2

Infolding Siegel disc near 1/3. One can see virtual Siegel disc

Infolding Siegel disc near 2/7

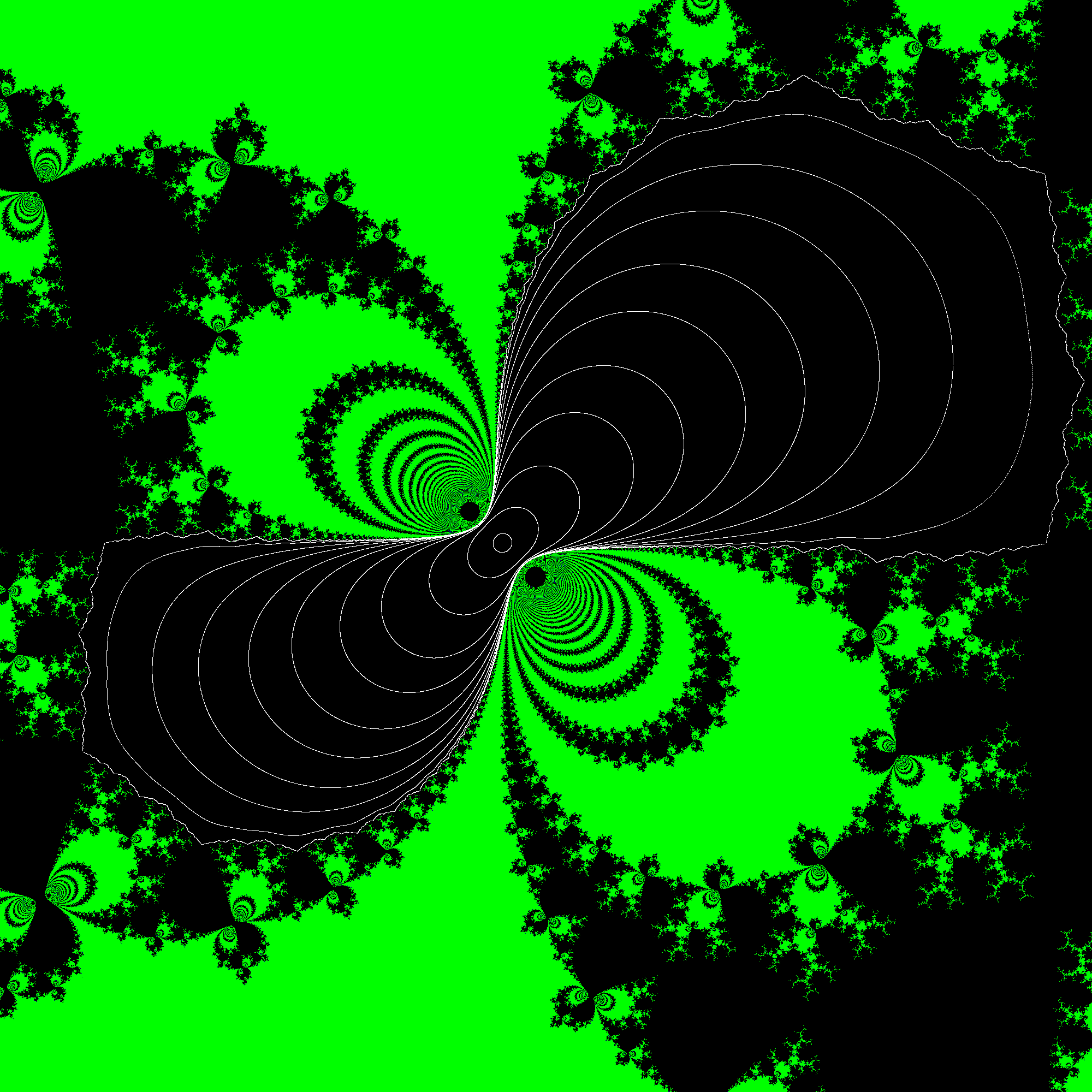

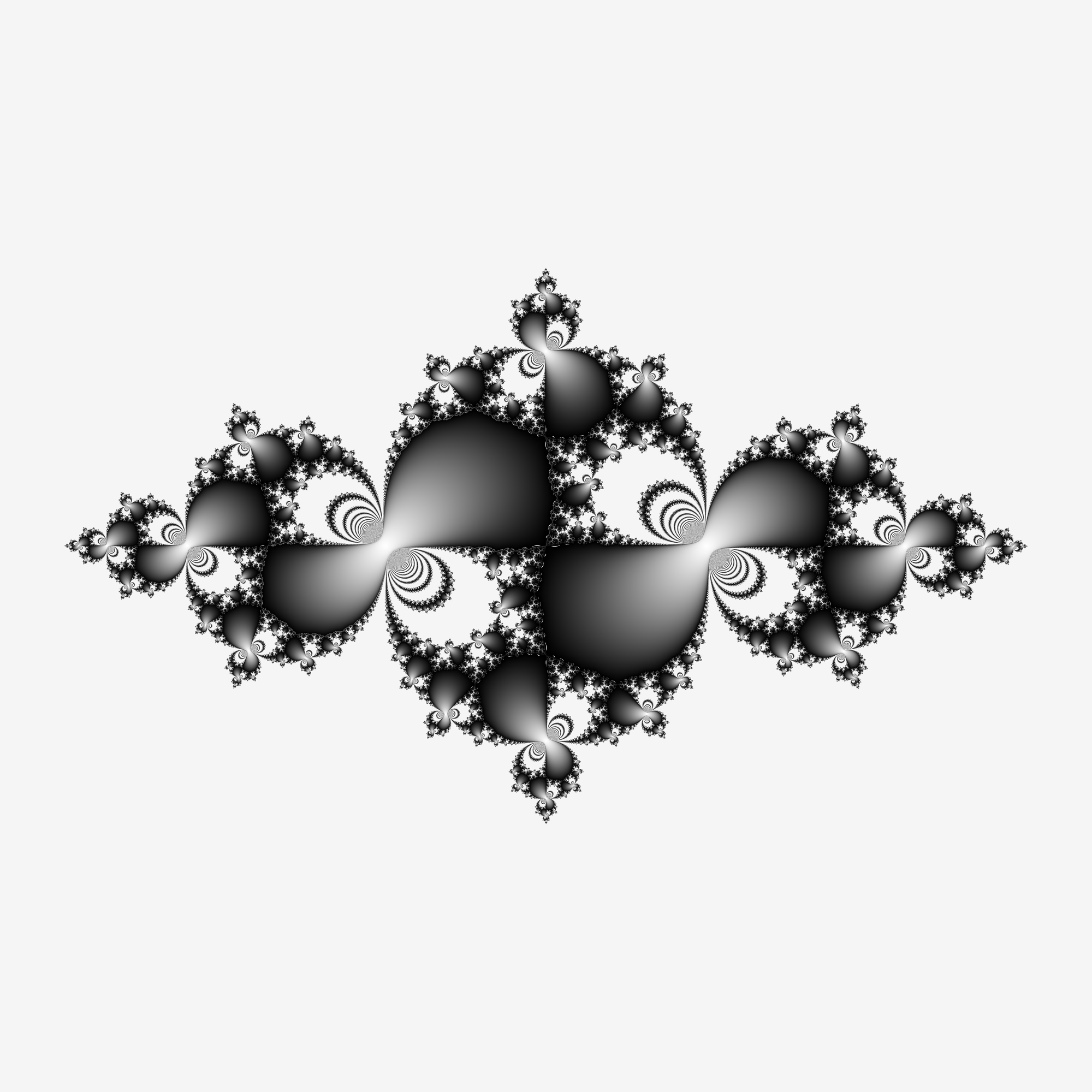
Julia set for fc(z) = z*z+c where c = -0.749998153581339 +0.001569040474910*I. Internal angle in turns is t = 0.49975027919634618290

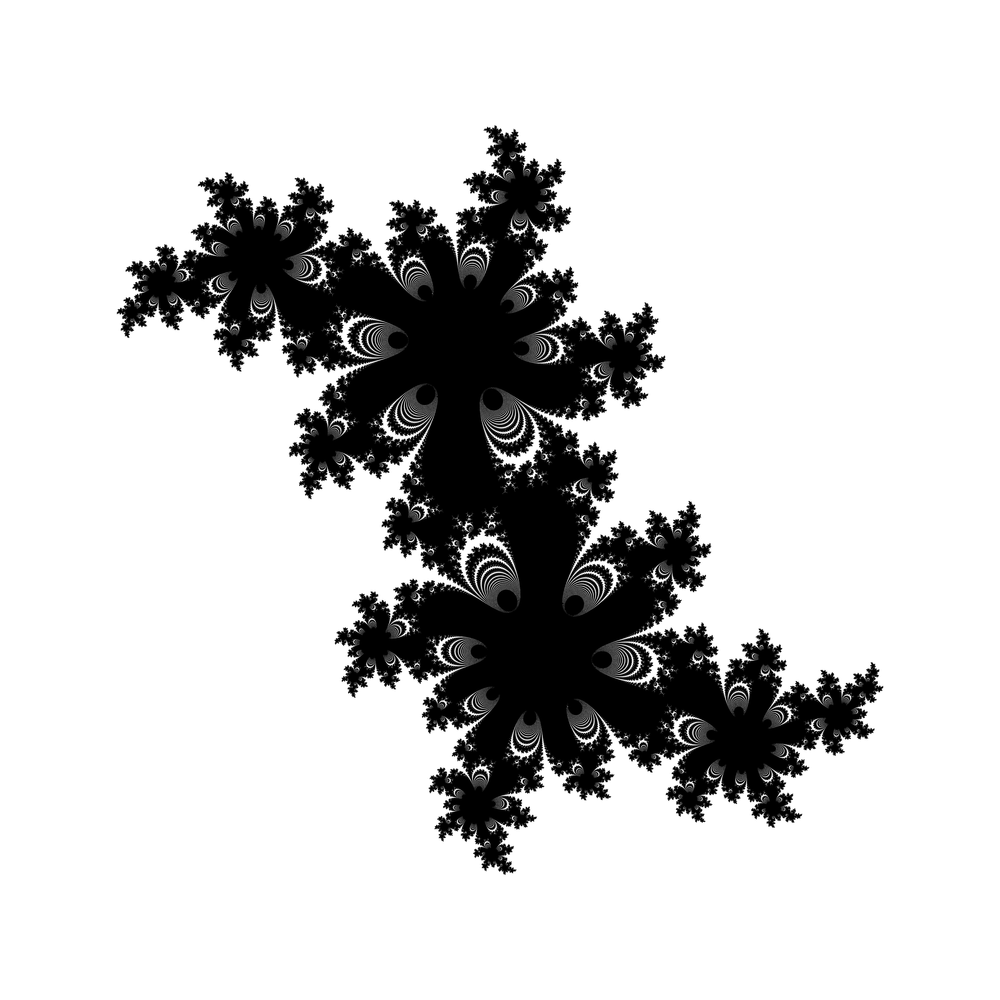
Julia set of quadratic polynomial with Siegel disk for rotation number [3,2,1000,1...]

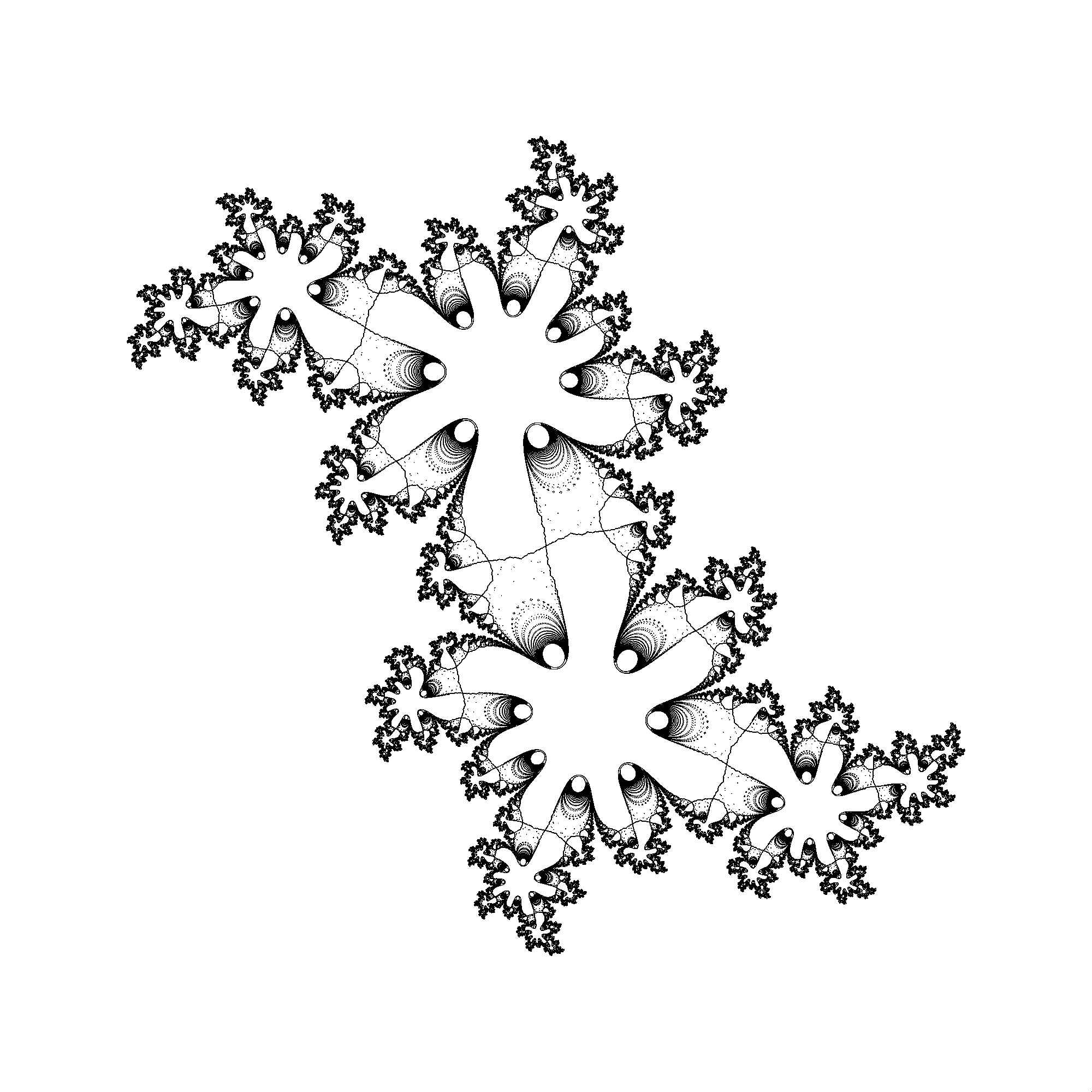

== Formal definition ==
Let $f\colon S\to S$ be a holomorphic endomorphism where $S$ is a Riemann surface, and let U be a connected component of the Fatou set $\mathcal{F}(f)$. We say U is a Siegel disc of f around the point $z_0$ if there exists a biholomorphism $\phi:U\to\mathbb{D}$ where $\mathbb{D}$ is the unit disc and such that $\phi(f^n(\phi^{-1}(z)))=e^{2\pi i\alpha n}z$ for some $\alpha\in\mathbb{R}\backslash\mathbb{Q}$ and $\phi(z_0)=0$.

Siegel's theorem proves the existence of Siegel discs for irrational numbers satisfying a strong irrationality condition (a Diophantine condition), thus solving an open problem since Fatou conjectured his theorem on the Classification of Fatou components.

Later Alexander D. Brjuno improved this condition on the irrationality, enlarging it to the Brjuno numbers.

This is part of the result from the Classification of Fatou components.

== See also ==
- Douady rabbit
- Herman ring
