= Quasitoric manifold =

In mathematics, a quasitoric manifold is a topological analogue of the nonsingular projective toric variety of algebraic geometry. A smooth $2n$-dimensional manifold is a quasitoric manifold if it admits a smooth, locally standard action of an $n$-dimensional torus, with orbit space an $n$-dimensional simple convex polytope.

Quasitoric manifolds were introduced in 1991 by M. Davis and T. Januszkiewicz, who called them "toric manifolds". However, the term "quasitoric manifold" was eventually adopted to avoid confusion with the class of compact smooth toric varieties, which are known to algebraic geometers as toric manifolds.

Quasitoric manifolds are studied in a variety of contexts in algebraic topology, such as complex cobordism theory, and the other oriented cohomology theories.

== Definitions ==
Denote the $i$-th subcircle of the $n$-torus $T^n$ by $T_i$ so that $T_1 \times \ldots \times T_n = T^n$. Then coordinate-wise multiplication of $T^n$ on $\mathbb{C}^n$ is called the standard representation.

Given open sets $X$ in $M^{2n}$ and $Y$ in $\mathbb{C}^n$, that are closed under the action of $T^n$, a $T^{n}$-action on $M^{2n}$ is defined to be locally isomorphic to the standard representation if $h(tx) = \alpha(t)h(x)$, for all $t$ in $T^n$, $x$ in $X$, where $h$ is a homeomorphism $X \rightarrow Y$, and $\alpha$ is an automorphism of $T^n$.

Given a simple convex polytope $P^n$ with $m$ facets, a $T^n$-manifold $M^{2n}$ is a quasitoric manifold over $P^n$ if,

1. the $T^n$-action is locally isomorphic to the standard representation,
2. there is a projection $\pi : M^{2n} \rightarrow P^n$ that maps each $l$-dimensional orbit to a point in the interior of an $l$-dimensional face of $P^n$, for $l = 0,$ $...,$ $n$.

The definition implies that the fixed points of $M^{2n}$ under the $T^n$-action are mapped to the vertices of $P^n$ by $\pi$, while points where the action is free project to the interior of the polytope.

== The dicharacteristic function ==
A quasitoric manifold can be described in terms of a dicharacteristic function and an associated dicharacteristic matrix. In this setting it is useful to assume that the facets $F_1,\dots,F_m$ of $P^n$ are ordered so that the intersection $F_{1} \cap \dots \cap F_{n}$ is a vertex $v$ of $P^{n}$, called the initial vertex.

A dicharacteristic function is a homomorphism $\lambda : T^m \rightarrow T^n$, such that if $F_{i_1} \cap \dots \cap F_{i_k}$ is a codimension-$k$ face of $P^n$, then $\lambda$ is a monomorphism on restriction to the subtorus $T_{i_1} \times \dots \times T_{i_k}$ in $T^m$.

The restriction of λ to the subtorus $T_1 \times \ldots \times T_n$ corresponding to the initial vertex $v$ is an isomorphism, and so $\lambda(T_1), \ldots, \lambda(T_n)$ can be taken to be a basis for the Lie algebra of $T^n$. The epimorphism of Lie algebras associated to λ may be described as a linear transformation $\mathbb{Z}^m \rightarrow \mathbb{Z}^n$, represented by the $n \times m$ dicharacteristic matrix $\Lambda$ given by

$$\begin{bmatrix}
1 & 0 & \dots & 0 & \lambda_{1, n+1} & \dots & \lambda_{1, m}\\
0 & 1 & \dots & 0 & \lambda_{2, n+1} & \dots & \lambda_{2, m}\\
\vdots & \vdots & \ddots & \vdots & \vdots & \ddots & \vdots \\
0 & 0 & \dots & 1 & \lambda_{n, n+1} & \dots & \lambda_{n, m}
\end{bmatrix}.$$

The $i$th column of $\Lambda$ is a primitive vector $\lambda_i = (\lambda_{1, i}, \dots, \lambda_{n, i})$ in $\mathbb{Z}^n$, called the facet vector. As each facet vector is primitive, whenever the facets $F_{i_1} \cap \dots \cap F_{i_n}$ meet in a vertex, the corresponding columns $\lambda_{i_1}, \dots \lambda_{i_n}$ form a basis of $\mathbb{Z}^n$, with determinant equal to $\pm 1$. The isotropy subgroup associated to each facet $F_i$ is described by

$$\{(e^{2\pi i \theta\lambda_{1,i}}, \ldots, e^{2\pi i \theta\lambda_{n,i}}) \in T^n \},$$

for some $\theta$ in $\mathbb{R}$.

In their original treatment of quasitoric manifolds, Davis and Januskiewicz introduced the notion of a characteristic function that mapped each facet of the polytope to a vector determining the isotropy subgroup of the facet, but this is only defined up to sign. In more recent studies of quasitoric manifolds, this ambiguity has been removed by the introduction of the dicharacteristic function and its insistence that each circle $\lambda(T_i)$ be oriented, forcing a choice of sign for each vector $\lambda_i$. The notion of the dicharacteristic function was originally introduced V. Buchstaber and N. Ray to enable the study of quasitoric manifolds in complex cobordism theory. This was further refined by introducing the ordering of the facets of the polytope to define the initial vertex, which eventually leads to the above neat representation of the dicharacteristic matrix $\Lambda$ as $(I_n \mid S)$, where $I_n$ is the identity matrix and $S$ is an $n \times (m-n)$ submatrix.

== Relation to the moment-angle complex ==
The kernel $K(\lambda)$ of the dicharacteristic function acts freely on the moment angle complex $Z_{P^n}$, and so defines a principal $K(\lambda)$-bundle $Z_{P^n} \rightarrow M^{2n}$ over the resulting quotient space $M^{2n}$. This quotient space can be viewed as

$$T^n \times P^n / \sim,$$

where pairs $(t_1, p_1)$, $(t_2, p_2)$ of $T^n \times P^n$ are identified if and only if $p_1 = p_2$ and $t_1^{-1}t_2$ is in the image of $\lambda$ on restriction to the subtorus $T_{i_1} \times \dots \times T_{i_k}$ that corresponds to the unique face $F_{i_1} \cap \dots \cap F_{i_k}$ of $P^n$ containing the point $p_1$, for some $1 \leq k \leq n$.

It can be shown that any quasitoric manifold $M^{2n}$ over $P^n$ is equivariently diffeomorphic to a quasitoric manifold of the form of the quotient space above.

== Examples ==
- The $n$-dimensional complex projective space $\mathbb{C}P^n$ is a quasitoric manifold over the $n$-simplex $\Delta^n$. If $\Delta^n$ is embedded in $\mathbb{R}^{n+1}$ so that the origin is the initial vertex, a dicharacteristic function can be chosen so that the associated dicharacteristic matrix is

$$\begin{bmatrix}
1 & 0 & \dots & 0 & -1\\
0 & 1 & \dots & 0 & -1\\
\vdots & \vdots & \ddots & \vdots & \vdots \\
0 & 0 & \dots & 1 & -1
\end{bmatrix}.$$

The moment angle complex $Z_{\Delta^n}$ is the $(2n+1)$-sphere $S^{2n+1}$, the kernel $K(\lambda)$ is the diagonal subgroup $\{(t, \dots, t)\} < T^{n+1}$, so the quotient of $Z_{\Delta^n}$ under the action of $K(\lambda)$ is $\mathbb{C}P^n$.

- The Bott manifolds that form the stages in a Bott tower are quasitoric manifolds over $n$-cubes. The $n$-cube $I^n$ is embedded in $\mathbb{R}^{2n}$ so that the origin is the initial vertex, and a dicharacteristic function is chosen so that the associated dicharacteristic matrix $(I_n \mid S)$ has $S$ given by

$$\begin{bmatrix}
1       &0          &\cdots &0      &0      &\cdots &0  &0  \\
-a(1,2)   &1          &\cdots &0      &0      &\cdots &0  &0  \\
\vdots      &\vdots         &   &\vdots     &\vdots     &   &\vdots &\vdots \\
-a(1,i)   &-a(2,i)      &\cdots &-a(i-1,i)    &1      &\cdots &0  &0  \\
\vdots      &\vdots         &   &\vdots     &\vdots     &   &\vdots &\vdots \\
-a(1,n) &-a(2,n)        &\cdots &-a(i-1,n)  &-a(i,n)    &\cdots &-a(n-1,n)  &1
\end{bmatrix},$$

for integers $a(i,j)$.

The moment angle complex $Z_{I^n}$ is a product of $n$ copies of 3-sphere embedded in $\mathbb{C}^{2n}$, the kernel $K(\lambda)$ is given by

$$\{(t_1,t_1^{-a(1,2)}t_2,\dots,t_1^{-a(1,i)}\dots t_{i-1}^{-a(i-1,i)}t_i,\dots, t_1^{-a(1,n)}\dots t_{n-1}^{-a(n-1,n)}t_n, t_1^{-1}, \dots, t_n^{-1}) : t_i \in T,  1\leq i\leq n \} < T^{2n}$$,

so that the quotient of $Z_{I^n}$ under the action of $K(\lambda)$ is the $n$-th stage of a Bott tower. The integer values $a(i,j)$ are the tensor powers of the line bundles whose product is used in the iterated sphere-bundle construction of the Bott tower.

== The cohomology ring of a quasitoric manifold ==
Canonical complex line bundles $\rho_i$ over $M^{2n}$ given by

$$Z_{P^n} \times_{K(l)} \mathbb{C}_i \longrightarrow M^{2n}$$,

can be associated with each facet $F_i$ of $P^n$, for $1 \leq i \leq m$, where $K(\lambda)$ acts on $\mathbb{C}_i$, by the restriction of $K(\lambda)$ to the $i$-th subcircle of $T^m$ embedded in $\mathbb{C}$. These bundles are known as the facial bundles associated to the quasitoric manifold. By the definition of $M^{2n}$, the preimage of a facet $\pi^{-1}(F_i)$ is a $2(n-1)$-dimensional quasitoric facial submanifold $M_i$ over $F_i$, whose isotropy subgroup is the restriction of $\lambda$ on the subcircle $T_i$ of $T^m$. Restriction of $\rho_i$ to $M_i$ gives the normal 2-plane bundle of the embedding of $M_i$ in $M^{2n}$.

Let $x_i$ in $H^2(M^{2n}; \mathbb{Z})$ denote the first Chern class of $\rho_i$. The integral cohomology ring $H^*(M^{2n}; \mathbb{Z})$ is generated by $x_i$, for $1 \leq i \leq m$, subject to two sets of relations. The first are the relations generated by the Stanley–Reisner ideal of $P^n$; linear relations determined by the dicharacterstic function comprise the second set:

$$x_i = -\lambda_{i, n+1}x_{n+1} - \cdots - \lambda_{i, m}x_m,  \mbox{ for } 1\leq i \leq n$$.

Therefore only $x_{n+1}, \dots, x_m$ are required to generate $H^*(M^{2n}; \mathbb{Z})$ multiplicatively.

== Comparison with toric manifolds ==
- Any projective toric manifold is a quasitoric manifold, and in some cases non-projective toric manifolds are also quasitoric manifolds.
- Not all quasitoric manifolds are toric manifolds. For example, the connected sum $\mathbb{C}P^2 \sharp \mathbb{C}P^2$ can be constructed as a quasitoric manifold, but it is not a toric manifold.
