= Riemann manifold =

Riemann manifold may refer to:

- Riemann surface in complex analysis
- Riemannian manifold in Riemannian geometry
- Zariski–Riemann space consisting of valuations
