= Symplectic cut =

In mathematics, specifically in symplectic geometry, the symplectic cut is a geometric modification on symplectic manifolds. Its effect is to decompose a given manifold into two pieces. There is an inverse operation, the symplectic sum, that glues two manifolds together into one. The symplectic cut can also be viewed as a generalization of symplectic blow up. The cut was introduced in 1995 by Eugene Lerman, who used it to study the symplectic quotient and other operations on manifolds.

== Topological description ==
Let $(X, \omega)$ be any symplectic manifold and

$$\mu : X \to \mathbb{R}$$

a Hamiltonian on $X$. Let $\epsilon$ be any regular value of $\mu$, so that the level set $\mu^{-1}(\epsilon)$ is a smooth manifold. Assume furthermore that $\mu^{-1}(\epsilon)$ is fibered in circles, each of which is an integral curve of the induced Hamiltonian vector field.

Under these assumptions, $\mu^{-1}([\epsilon, \infty))$ is a manifold with boundary $\mu^{-1}(\epsilon)$, and one can form a manifold

$$\overline{X}_{\mu \geq \epsilon}$$

by collapsing each circle fiber to a point. In other words, $\overline{X}_{\mu \geq \epsilon}$ is $X$ with the subset $\mu^{-1}((-\infty, \epsilon))$ removed and the boundary collapsed along each circle fiber. The quotient of the boundary is a submanifold of $\overline{X}_{\mu \geq \epsilon}$ of codimension two, denoted $V$.

Similarly, one may form from $\mu^{-1}((-\infty, \epsilon])$ a manifold $\overline{X}_{\mu \leq \epsilon}$, which also contains a copy of $V$. The symplectic cut is the pair of manifolds $\overline{X}_{\mu \leq \epsilon}$ and $\overline{X}_{\mu \geq \epsilon}$.

Sometimes it is useful to view the two halves of the symplectic cut as being joined along their shared submanifold $V$ to produce a singular space

$$\overline{X}_{\mu \leq \epsilon} \cup_V \overline{X}_{\mu \geq \epsilon}.$$

For example, this singular space is the central fiber in the symplectic sum regarded as a deformation.

== Symplectic description ==
The preceding description is rather crude; more care is required to keep track of the symplectic structure on the symplectic cut. For this, let $(X, \omega)$ be any symplectic manifold. Assume that the circle group $U(1)$ acts on $X$ in a Hamiltonian way with moment map

$$\mu : X \to \mathbb{R}.$$

This moment map can be viewed as a Hamiltonian function that generates the circle action. The product space $X \times \mathbb{C}$, with coordinate $z$ on $\mathbb{C}$, comes with an induced symplectic form

$$\omega \oplus (-i dz \wedge d\bar{z}).$$

The group $U(1)$ acts on the product in a Hamiltonian way by

$$e^{i\theta} \cdot (x, z) = (e^{i \theta} \cdot x, e^{-i \theta} z)$$

with moment map

$$\nu(x, z) = \mu(x) - |z|^2.$$

Let $\epsilon$ be any real number such that the circle action is free on $\mu^{-1}(\epsilon)$. Then $\epsilon$ is a regular value of $\nu$, and $\nu^{-1}(\epsilon)$ is a manifold.

This manifold $\nu^{-1}(\epsilon)$ contains as a submanifold the set of points $(x, z)$ with $\mu(x) = \epsilon$ and $|z|^2 = 0$; this submanifold is naturally identified with $\mu^{-1}(\epsilon)$. The complement of the submanifold, which consists of points $(x, z)$ with $\mu(x) > \epsilon$, is naturally identified with the product of

$$X_{> \epsilon} := \mu^{-1}((\epsilon, \infty))$$

and the circle.

The manifold $\nu^{-1}(\epsilon)$ inherits the Hamiltonian circle action, as do its two submanifolds just described. So one may form the symplectic quotient

$$\overline{X}_{\mu \geq \epsilon} := \nu^{-1}(\epsilon) / U(1).$$

By construction, it contains $X_{\mu > \epsilon}$ as a dense open submanifold; essentially, it compactifies this open manifold with the symplectic quotient

$$V := \mu^{-1}(\epsilon) / U(1),$$

which is a symplectic submanifold of $\overline{X}_{\mu \geq \epsilon}$ of codimension two.

If $X$ is Kähler, then so is the cut space $\overline{X}_{\mu \geq \epsilon}$; however, the embedding of $X_{\mu > \epsilon}$ is not an isometry.

One constructs $\overline{X}_{\mu \leq \epsilon}$, the other half of the symplectic cut, in a symmetric manner. The normal bundles of $V$ in the two halves of the cut are opposite each other (meaning symplectically anti-isomorphic). The symplectic sum of $\overline{X}_{\mu \geq \epsilon}$ and $\overline{X}_{\mu \leq \epsilon}$ along $V$ recovers $X$.

The existence of a global Hamiltonian circle action on $X$ appears to be a restrictive assumption. However, it is not actually necessary; the cut can be performed under more general hypotheses, such as a local Hamiltonian circle action near $\mu^{-1}(\epsilon)$ (since the cut is a local operation).

== Blow up as cut ==
When a complex manifold $X$ is blown up along a submanifold $Z$, the blow up locus $Z$ is replaced by an exceptional divisor $E$ and the rest of the manifold is left undisturbed. Topologically, this operation may also be viewed as the removal of an $\epsilon$-neighborhood of the blow up locus, followed by the collapse of the boundary by the Hopf map.

Blowing up a symplectic manifold is more subtle, since the symplectic form must be adjusted in a neighborhood of the blow up locus in order to continue smoothly across the exceptional divisor in the blow up. The symplectic cut is an elegant means of making the neighborhood-deletion/boundary-collapse process symplectically rigorous.

As before, let $(X, \omega)$ be a symplectic manifold with a Hamiltonian $U(1)$-action with moment map $\mu$. Assume that the moment map is proper and that it achieves its maximum $m$ exactly along a symplectic submanifold $Z$ of $X$. Assume furthermore that the weights of the isotropy representation of $U(1)$ on the normal bundle $N_X Z$ are all $1$.

Then for small $\epsilon$ the only critical points in $X_{\mu > m - \epsilon}$ are those on $Z$. The symplectic cut $\overline{X}_{\mu \leq m - \epsilon}$, which is formed by deleting a symplectic $\epsilon$-neighborhood of $Z$ and collapsing the boundary, is then the symplectic blow up of $X$ along $Z$.
