= Blowing up =

Type of geometric transformation

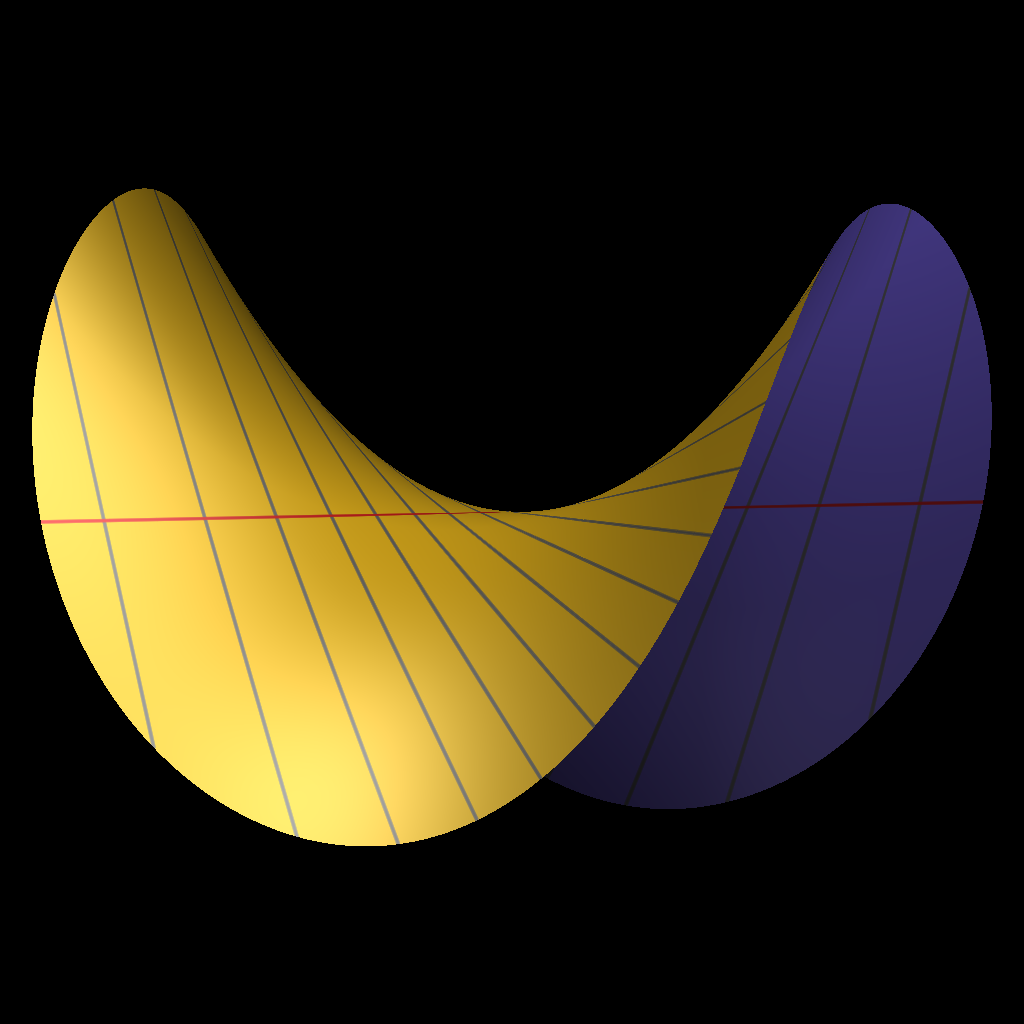
Blowup of the affine plane.

In mathematics, blowing up or blowup is a type of geometric transformation which replaces a subspace of a given space with the space of all directions pointing out of that subspace. For example, the blowup of a point in a plane replaces the point with the projectivized tangent space at that point. The metaphor is that of zooming in on a photograph to enlarge part of the picture, rather than referring to an explosion. The inverse operation is called blowing down.

Blowups are the most fundamental transformation in birational geometry, because every birational morphism between projective varieties is a blowup. The weak factorization theorem says that every birational map can be factored as a composition of particularly simple blowups. The Cremona group, the group of birational automorphisms of the plane, is generated by blowups.

Besides their importance in describing birational transformations, blowups are also an important way of constructing new spaces. For instance, most procedures for resolution of singularities proceed by blowing up singularities until they become smooth. A consequence of this is that blowups can be used to resolve the singularities of birational maps.

Classically, blowups were defined extrinsically, by first defining the blowup on spaces such as projective space using an explicit construction in coordinates and then defining blowups on other spaces in terms of an embedding. This is reflected in some of the terminology, such as the classical term monoidal transformation. Contemporary algebraic geometry treats blowing up as an intrinsic operation on an algebraic variety. From this perspective, a blowup is the universal (in the sense of category theory) way to turn a subvariety into a Cartier divisor.

A blowup can also be called monoidal transformation, locally quadratic transformation, dilatation, σ-process, or Hopf map.

== The blowup of a point in a plane ==
The simplest case of a blowup is the blowup of a point in a plane. Most of the general features of blowing up can be seen in this example.

The blowup has a synthetic description as an incidence correspondence. Recall that the Grassmannian $\mathbf{Gr}(1,2)$ parametrizes the set of all lines through a point in the plane. The blowup of the projective plane $\mathbf{P}^2$ at the point $P$, which we will denote $X$, is

$$X = \{ (Q, \ell) \mid P,\,Q \in \ell\} \subseteq \mathbf{P}^2 \times \mathbf{Gr}(1,2).$$

Here $Q$ denotes another point in $\mathbf{P}^2$ and $\ell$ is an element of the Grassmannian. $X$ is a projective variety because it is a closed subvariety of a product of projective varieties. It comes with a natural morphism $\pi$ to $\mathbf{P}^2$ that takes the pair $(Q, \ell)$ to $Q$. This morphism is an isomorphism on the open subset of all points $(Q, \ell)\in X$ with $Q\neq P$ because the line $\ell$ is determined by those two points. When $Q=P$, however, the line $\ell$ can be any line through $P$. These lines correspond to the space of directions through $P$, which is isomorphic to $\mathbf{P}^1$. This $\mathbf{P}^1$ is called the exceptional divisor, and by definition it is the projectivized normal space at $P$. Because $P$ is a point, the normal space is the same as the tangent space, so the exceptional divisor is isomorphic to the projectivized tangent space at $P$.

To give coordinates on the blowup, we can write down equations for the above incidence correspondence. Give $\mathbf{P}^2$ homogeneous coordinates $[X_0:X_1:X_2]$ in which $P$ is the point $[P_0:P_1:P_2]$. By projective duality, $\mathbf{Gr}(1,2)$ is isomorphic to $\mathbf{P}^2$, so we may give it homogeneous coordinates $[L_0:L_1:L_2]$. A line $\ell_0 = [L_0:L_1:L_2]$ is the set of all $[X_0:X_1:X_2]$ such that $X_0L_0+X_1L_1+X_2L_2=0$. Therefore, the blowup can be described as

$$X = \bigl\{ \bigl([X_0:X_1:X_2],[L_0:L_1:L_2]\bigr) \mid P_0L_0 + P_1L_1 + P_2L_2 = 0,\, X_0L_0 + X_1L_1 + X_2L_2 = 0 \bigr\} \subseteq \mathbf{P}^2 \times \mathbf{P}^2.$$

The blowup is an isomorphism away from $P$, and by working in the affine plane instead of the projective plane, we can give simpler equations for the blowup. After a projective transformation, we may assume that $P=[0:0:1]$. Write $x$ and $y$ for the coordinates on the affine plane $\{X_2\neq 0\}$. The condition $P\in\ell$ implies that $L_2=0$, so we may replace the Grassmannian with a $\mathbf{P}^1$. Then the blowup is the variety

$$\bigl\{ \bigl((x,y),[z:w]\bigr) \mid xz + yw = 0 \bigr\} \subseteq \mathbf{A}^2 \times \mathbf{P}^1.$$

It is more common to change coordinates so as to reverse one of the signs. Then the blowup can be written as

$$\left \{ \bigl((x,y),[z:w]\bigr) \mid \det\begin{bmatrix}x&y\\w&z\end{bmatrix} = 0 \right \}.$$

This equation is easier to generalize than the previous one.

The blowup can be easily visualized if we remove the infinity point of the Grassmannian, e.g. by setting $w=1$, and obtain the standard saddle surface $y=xz$ in 3D space.

The blowup can also be described by directly using coordinates on the normal space to the point. Again we work on the affine plane $\mathbf{A}^2$. The normal space to the origin is the vector space $\mathfrak{m}/\mathfrak{m}^2$, where $\mathfrak{m}=(x,y)$ is the maximal ideal of the origin. Algebraically, the projectivization of this vector space is Proj of its symmetric algebra, that is,

$$X = \operatorname{Proj} \bigoplus_{r=0}^\infty \operatorname{Sym}^r_{k[x,y]} \mathfrak{m}/\mathfrak{m}^2.$$

In this example, this has a concrete description as

$$X = \operatorname{Proj} k[x,y][z,w]/(xz - yw),$$

where $x$ and $y$ have degree 0 and $z$ and $w$ have degree 1.

Over the real or complex numbers, the blowup has a topological description as the connected sum $\mathbf{P}^2\#\mathbf{P}^2$. Assume that $P$ is the origin in $\mathbf{A}^2\subseteq\mathbf{P}^2$ , and write $L$ for the line at infinity. $\mathbf{A}^2\backslash\{0\}$ has an inversion map ${t}$ which sends $(x,y)$ to $\left(\frac{x}{\vert x \vert ^2 + \vert y \vert ^2},\frac{y}{\vert x \vert ^2 + \vert y \vert ^2}\right)$. $t$ is the circle inversion with respect to the unit sphere $S$: It fixes $S$, preserves each line through the origin, and exchanges the inside of the sphere with the outside. $t$ extends to a continuous map $\mathbf{P}^2\backslash\{0\}\to \mathbf{A}^2$ by sending the line at infinity to the origin. This extension, which we also denote $t$, can be used to construct the blowup. Let $C$ denote the complement of the unit ball. The blowup $X$ is the manifold obtained by attaching two copies of $C$ along $S$. $X$ comes with a map $\pi$ to $\mathbf{P}^2$ which is the identity on the first copy of $C$ and $t$ on the second copy of $C$. This map is an isomorphism away from $P$, and the fiber over $P$ is the line at infinity in the second copy of $C$. Each point in this line corresponds to a unique line through the origin, so the fiber over $\pi$ corresponds to the possible normal directions through the origin.

For $\mathbf{CP}^2$ this process ought to produce an oriented manifold. In order to make this happen, the two copies of $C$ should be given opposite orientations. In symbols, $X$ is $\mathbf{CP}^2\#\overline{\mathbf{CP}^2}$, where $\overline{\mathbf{CP}^2}$ is $\mathbf{CP}^2$ with the opposite of the standard orientation.

== Blowing up points in complex space ==
Let Z be the origin in n-dimensional complex space, C^{n}. That is, Z is the point where the n coordinate functions $x_1, \ldots, x_n$ simultaneously vanish. Let P^{n - 1} be (n - 1)-dimensional complex projective space with homogeneous coordinates $y_1, \ldots, y_n$. Let $\tilde{\mathbf{C}^n}$ be the subset of C^{n} × P^{n - 1} that satisfies simultaneously the equations $x_i y_j = x_j y_i$ for i, j = 1, ..., n. The projection

$$\pi : \mathbf{C}^n \times \mathbf{P}^{n - 1} \to \mathbf{C}^n$$

naturally induces a holomorphic map

$$\pi : \tilde{\mathbf{C}^n} \to \mathbf{C}^n.$$

This map π (or, often, the space $\tilde{\mathbf{C}^n}$) is called the blow-up (variously spelled blow up or blowup) of C^{n}.

The exceptional divisor E is defined as the inverse image of the blow-up locus Z under π. It is easy to see that

$$E = Z \times \mathbf{P}^{n - 1} \subseteq \mathbf{C}^n \times \mathbf{P}^{n - 1}$$

is a copy of projective space. It is an effective divisor. Away from E, π is an isomorphism between $\tilde{\mathbf{C}^n} \setminus E$ and C^{n} \ Z; it is a birational map between $\tilde{\mathbf{C}^n}$ and C^{n}.

If instead we consider the holomorphic projection

$$q\colon \tilde{\mathbf{C}^n} \to \mathbf{P}^{n-1}$$

we obtain the tautological line bundle of $\mathbf{P}^{n-1}$ and we can identify the exceptional divisor $\lbrace Z\rbrace\times\mathbf{P}^{n-1}$ with its zero section, namely $\mathbf{0}\colon \mathbf{P}^{n-1}\to\mathcal{O}_{\mathbf{P}^{n-1}}$ which assigns to each point $p$ the zero element $\mathbf{0}_p$ in the fiber over $p$.

== Blowing up submanifolds in complex manifolds ==
More generally, one can blow up any codimension-$k$ complex submanifold $Z$ of $\mathbf C^n$. Suppose that $Z$ is the locus of the equations $x_1 = \cdots = x_k = 0$, and let $y_1, \ldots, y_k$ be homogeneous coordinates on $\mathbf P^{k-1}$. Then the blow-up $\tilde{\mathbf{C}}^n$ is the locus of the equations $x_i y_j = x_j y_i$ for all $1\leq i,j\leq k$, in the space $\mathbf C^n \times \mathbf P^{k-1}$.

More generally still, one can blow up any submanifold of any complex manifold $X$ by applying this construction locally. The effect is, as before, to replace the blow-up locus $Z$ with the exceptional divisor $E$. In other words, the blow-up map

$$\pi : \tilde X \to X$$

is a birational mapping which, away from $E$, induces an isomorphism, and, on $E$, a locally trivial fibration with fiber $\mathbf P^{k-1}$. Indeed, the restriction $\pi|_E : E \to Z$ is naturally seen as the projectivization of the normal bundle of $Z$ in $X$.

Since $E$ is a smooth divisor (which has co-dim 1), its normal bundle is a line bundle. It is not difficult to show that $E$ intersects itself negatively. This means that its normal bundle possesses no holomorphic sections; $E$ is the only smooth complex representative of its homology class in $\tilde X$. (Suppose $E$ could be perturbed off itself to another complex submanifold in the same class. Then the two submanifolds would intersect positively — as complex submanifolds always do — contradicting the negative self-intersection of $E$.) This is why the divisor is called exceptional.

Let $V$ be some submanifold of $X$ other than $Z$. If $V$ is disjoint from $Z$, then it is essentially unaffected by blowing up along $Z$. However, if it intersects $Z$, then there are two distinct analogues of $V$ in the blow-up $\tilde X$. One is the proper (or strict) transform, which is the closure of $\pi^{-1}(V \setminus Z)$; its normal bundle in $\tilde X$ is typically different from that of $V$ in $X$. The other is the total transform, which incorporates some or all of $E$; it is essentially the pullback of $V$ in cohomology.

== Blowing up schemes ==
To pursue blow-up in its greatest generality, let X be a scheme, and let $\mathcal{I}$ be a coherent sheaf of ideals on X. The blow-up of X with respect to $\mathcal{I}$ is a scheme $\tilde{X}$ along with a morphism

$$\pi\colon \tilde{X} \rightarrow X$$

such that the pullback $\pi^{-1} \mathcal{I} \cdot \mathcal{O}_{\tilde{X}}$ is an invertible sheaf, characterized by this universal property: for any morphism f: Y → X such that $f^{-1} \mathcal{I} \cdot \mathcal{O}_Y$ is an invertible sheaf, f factors uniquely through π.

Notice that

$$\tilde{X}=\mathbf{Proj} \bigoplus_{n=0}^{\infty} \mathcal{I}^n$$

has this property; this is how the blow-up is constructed (see also Rees algebra). Here Proj is the Proj construction on graded sheaves of commutative rings.

=== Exceptional divisors ===
The exceptional divisor of a blowup $\pi : \operatorname{Bl}_\mathcal{I} X \to X$ is the subscheme defined by the inverse image of the ideal sheaf $\mathcal{I}$, which is sometimes denoted $\pi^{-1}\mathcal{I}\cdot\mathcal{O}_{\operatorname{Bl}_\mathcal{I} X}$. It follows from the definition of the blow up in terms of Proj that this subscheme E is defined by the ideal sheaf $\textstyle\bigoplus_{n=0}^\infty \mathcal{I}^{n+1}$. This ideal sheaf is also the relative $\mathcal{O}(1)$ for π.

π is an isomorphism away from the exceptional divisor, but the exceptional divisor need not be in the exceptional locus of π. That is, π may be an isomorphism on E. This happens, for example, in the trivial situation where $\mathcal{I}$ is already an invertible sheaf. In particular, in such cases the morphism π does not determine the exceptional divisor. Another situation where the exceptional locus can be strictly smaller than the exceptional divisor is when X has singularities. For instance, let X be the affine cone over P^{1} × P^{1}. X can be given as the vanishing locus of xw − yz in A^{4}. The ideals (x, y) and (x, z) define two planes, each of which passes through the vertex of X. Away from the vertex, these planes are hypersurfaces in X, so the blowup is an isomorphism there. The exceptional locus of the blowup of either of these planes is therefore centered over the vertex of the cone, and consequently it is strictly smaller than the exceptional divisor.

== Further examples ==
=== Blowups of linear subspaces ===
Let $\mathbf{P}^n$ be n-dimensional projective space. Fix a linear subspace L of dimension d. There are several explicit ways to describe the blowup of $\mathbf{P}^n$ along L. Suppose that $\mathbf{P}^n$ has coordinates $X_0, \dots, X_n$. After changing coordinates, we may assume that $L = \{X_{0} = \dots = X_{n-d} = 0\}$. The blowup may be embedded in $\mathbf{P}^n \times \mathbf{P}^{n-d-1}$. Let $Y_0, \dots, Y_{n-d}$ be coordinates on the second factor. Because L is defined by a regular sequence, the blowup is determined by the vanishing of the two-by-two minors of the matrix
$$\begin{pmatrix}
X_0 & \cdots & X_{n-d} \\
Y_0 & \cdots & Y_{n-d}
\end{pmatrix}.$$
This system of equations is equivalent to asserting that the two rows are linearly dependent. A point $P \in \mathbf{P}^n$ is in L if and only if, when its coordinates are substituted in the first row of the matrix above, that row is zero. In this case, there are no conditions on Q. If, however, that row is non-zero, then linear dependence implies that the second row is a scalar multiple of the first and therefore that there is a unique point $Q \in \mathbf{P}^{n-d}$ such that $(P, Q)$ is in the blowup.

This blowup can also be given a synthetic description as the incidence correspondence
$$\{(P, M) \colon P \in M,\,L \subseteq M\} \subseteq \mathbf{P}^n \times \operatorname{Gr}(n, n - d + 1),$$
where $\operatorname{Gr}$ denotes the Grassmannian of $(n - d + 1)$-dimensional subspaces in $\mathbf{P}^n$. To see the relation with the previous coordinatization, observe that the set of all $M \in \operatorname{Gr}(n, n - d + 1)$ that contain L is isomorphic to a projective space $\mathbf{P}^{n-d}$. This is because each subspace M is the linear join of L and a point Q not in L, and two points Q and Q' determine the same M if and only if they have the same image under the projection of $\mathbf{P}^n$ away from L. Therefore, the Grassmannian may be replaced by a copy of $\mathbf{P}^{n-d}$. When $P \not\in L$, there is only one subspace M containing P, the linear join of P and L. In the coordinates above, this is the case where $(X_0, \dots, X_{n-d})$ is not the zero vector. The case $P \in L$ corresponds to $(X_0, \dots, X_{n-d})$ being the zero vector, and in this case, any Q is allowed, that is, any M containing L is possible.

=== Blowing up intersections of curves scheme-theoretically ===
Let $f,g \in \mathbb{C}[x,y,z]$ be generic homogeneous polynomials of degree $d$ (meaning their associated projective varieties intersects at $d^2$ points by Bézout's theorem). The following projective morphism of schemes gives a model of blowing up $\mathbb{P}^2$ at $d^2$ points:
$$\begin{matrix}
\textbf{Proj}\left( \dfrac{\mathbb{C}[s,t][x,y,z]}{(sf(x,y,z) + tg(x,y,z))} \right) \\
\downarrow \\
\textbf{Proj}(\mathbb{C}[x,y,z])
\end{matrix}$$
Looking at the fibers explains why this is true: if we take a point $p = [x_0:x_1:x_2]$ then the pullback diagram
$$\begin{matrix}
\textbf{Proj}\left( \dfrac{\mathbb{C}[s,t]}{sf(p) + tg(p)} \right)& \rightarrow & \textbf{Proj}\left( \dfrac{\mathbb{C}[s,t][x,y,z]}{(sf(x,y,z) + tg(x,y,z))} \right) \\
\downarrow & & \downarrow \\
\textbf{Spec}(\mathbb{C})& \xrightarrow{[x_0:x_1:x_2]} & \textbf{Proj}(\mathbb{C}[x,y,z])
\end{matrix}$$
tells us the fiber is a point whenever $f(p) \neq 0$ or $g(p) \neq 0$ and the fiber is $\mathbb{P}^1$ if $f(p) = g(p) = 0$.

== Related constructions ==
In the blow-up of C^{n} described above, there was nothing essential about the use of complex numbers; blow-ups can be performed over any field. For example, the real blow-up of R^{2} at the origin results in the Möbius strip; correspondingly, the blow-up of the two-sphere S^{2} results in the real projective plane.

Deformation to the normal cone is a blow-up technique used to prove many results in algebraic geometry. Given a scheme X and a closed subscheme V, one blows up

$$V \times \{0\} \ \text{in} \ Y = X \times \mathbf{C} \ \text{or} \ X \times \mathbf{P}^1$$

Then

$$\tilde Y \to \mathbf{C}$$

is a fibration. The general fiber is naturally isomorphic to X, while the central fiber is a union of two schemes: one is the blow-up of X along V, and the other is the normal cone of V with its fibers completed to projective spaces.

Blow-ups can also be performed in the symplectic category, by endowing the symplectic manifold with a compatible almost complex structure and proceeding with a complex blow-up. This makes sense on a purely topological level; however, endowing the blow-up with a symplectic form requires some care, because one cannot arbitrarily extend the symplectic form across the exceptional divisor E. One must alter the symplectic form in a neighborhood of E, or perform the blow-up by cutting out a neighborhood of Z and collapsing the boundary in a well-defined way. This is best understood using the formalism of symplectic cutting, of which symplectic blow-up is a special case. Symplectic cutting, together with the inverse operation of symplectic summation, is the symplectic analogue of deformation to the normal cone along a smooth divisor.

== See also ==
- Infinitely near point – Concept in algebraic geometry
- Resolution of singularities – Concept in algebraic geometry
