= Frances Kirwan =

British mathematician (born 1959)

Professor Dame Frances Kirwan DBE FRS
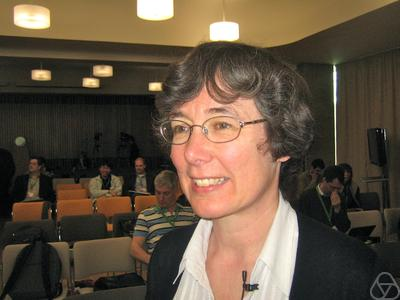
- Kirwan in 2009
- Born: 21 August 1959; UK
- Education: University of Cambridge; University of Oxford
- Awards: Whitehead Prize (1989); Senior Whitehead Prize (2013); Suffrage Science award (2016); Sylvester Medal (2021)
- Scientific career
- Fields: Mathematics
- Workplaces: University of Oxford
- Thesis: The Cohomology of Quotients in Symplectic and Algebraic Geometry
- Doctoral advisor: Michael Atiyah
- Website: www.maths.ox.ac.uk/people/frances.kirwan

Dame Frances Clare Kirwan (born 21 August 1959) is a British mathematician, currently Savilian Professor of Geometry at the University of Oxford. Her fields of specialisation are algebraic and symplectic geometry.

== Education ==
Kirwan was educated at Oxford High School, and studied maths as an undergraduate at Clare College, Cambridge. She took a DPhil degree at Oxford in 1984, with the dissertation title The Cohomology of Quotients in Symplectic and Algebraic Geometry, which was supervised by Michael Atiyah.

== Research ==
Kirwan's research interests include moduli spaces in algebraic geometry, geometric invariant theory (GIT), and in the link between GIT and moment maps in symplectic geometry. Her work endeavours to understand the structure of geometric objects by investigation of their algebraic and topological properties. She introduced the Kirwan map.

From 1983 to 1985, she held a junior fellowship at Harvard. From 1983 to 1986, she held a Fellowship at Magdalen College, Oxford, before becoming a Fellow of Balliol College, Oxford. She is an honorary fellow of Clare College, Cambridge and also at Magdalen College.

In 1996, she was awarded the Title of Distinction of Professor of Mathematics. From 2004 to 2006, she was president of the London Mathematical Society, the second-youngest president in the society's history and only the second woman to be president. In 2005, she received a five-year EPSRC Senior Research Fellowship, to support her research on the moduli spaces of complex algebraic curves.

In 2017, she was elected Savilian Professor of Geometry, becoming the first woman to hold the post. While this entailed a move to New College, Oxford, she was elected an emeritus fellow at Balliol. She was the convenor of the 2008–2009 meeting of European Women in Mathematics and deputy convenor of the following meeting in 2010–2011.

== Personal life ==
Kirwan is the mother of Geoff Penington, a physics professor at UC Berkeley. She was married to Michael Penington, an investment banker and the son of David Penington.

== Prizes, awards and scholarships ==
- London Mathematical Society Whitehead Prize, 1989
- Fellow of the Royal Society, 2001
- President, London Mathematical Society, 2003–2005
- EPSRC Senior Research Fellowship, 2005–2010, for her work in algebraic geometry
- Fellow of the American Mathematical Society, 2012
- London Mathematical Society Senior Whitehead Prize, 2013
- DBE for services to mathematics, 2014
- Maths and Computing Suffrage Science award, 2016
- Member of Academia Europaea
- Chairman of the United Kingdom Mathematics Trust
- Sylvester Medal of The Royal Society, 2021
- Honorary degree, University of York, 2020
- Honorary degree, University of St Andrews, 2022
- L'Oréal-UNESCO For Women in Science Awards (Laureate for Europe – Mathematics), 2023
- Honorary degree, University of Warwick, 2026

Kirwan served on the medal-selection committee that awarded the Fields medal to Maryam Mirzakhani.

== Publications ==
- Cohomology of Quotients in Symplectic and Algebraic Geometry. Mathematical Notes. Vol. 31. Princeton University Press. 1984. ISBN 978-0691083704.
- An Introduction to Intersection Homology Theory. Longman Scientific and Technical. 1988. with Jonathan Woolf: 2nd edn. CRC Press. 2006. ISBN 978-1584881841.
- Complex Algebraic Curves. London Mathematical Society Student Texts. Cambridge University Press. 1992. ISBN 978-0521423533.
