= Zariski space =

In algebraic geometry, a Zariski space, named for Oscar Zariski, has several different meanings:

- A topological space that is Noetherian (every open set is quasicompact)
- A topological space that is Noetherian and also sober (every nonempty closed irreducible subset is the closure of a unique point). The spectrum of any commutative Noetherian ring is a Zariski space in this sense
- A Zariski–Riemann space of valuations of a field
