= Symplectic sum =

In mathematics, specifically in symplectic geometry, the symplectic sum is a geometric modification on symplectic manifolds, which glues two given manifolds into a single new one. It is a symplectic version of connected summation along a submanifold, often called a fiber sum.

The symplectic sum is the inverse of the symplectic cut, which decomposes a given manifold into two pieces. Together the symplectic sum and cut may be viewed as a deformation of symplectic manifolds, analogous for example to deformation to the normal cone in algebraic geometry.

The symplectic sum has been used to construct previously unknown families of symplectic manifolds, and to derive relationships among the Gromov–Witten invariants of symplectic manifolds.

== Definition ==
Let $M_1$ and $M_2$ be two symplectic $2n$-manifolds and $V$ a symplectic $(2n - 2)$-manifold, embedded as a submanifold into both $M_1$ and $M_2$ via

$$j_i : V \hookrightarrow M_i,$$

such that the Euler classes of the normal bundles are opposite:

$$e(N_{M_1} V) = -e(N_{M_2} V).$$

In the 1995 paper that defined the symplectic sum, Robert Gompf proved that for any orientation-reversing isomorphism

$$\psi : N_{M_1} V \to N_{M_2} V$$

there is a canonical isotopy class of symplectic structures on the connected sum

$$(M_1, V) \# (M_2, V)$$

meeting several conditions of compatibility with the summands $M_i$. In other words, the theorem defines a symplectic sum operation whose result is a symplectic manifold, unique up to isotopy.

To produce a well-defined symplectic structure, the connected sum must be performed with special attention paid to the choices of various identifications. Loosely speaking, the isomorphism $\psi$ is composed with an orientation-reversing symplectic involution of the normal bundles of $V$ (or rather their corresponding punctured unit disk bundles); then this composition is used to glue $M_1$ to $M_2$ along the two copies of $V$.

== Generalizations ==
In greater generality, the symplectic sum can be performed on a single symplectic manifold $M$ containing two disjoint copies of $V$, gluing the manifold to itself along the two copies. The preceding description of the sum of two manifolds then corresponds to the special case where $X$ consists of two connected components, each containing a copy of $V$.

Additionally, the sum can be performed simultaneously on submanifolds $X_i \subseteq M_i$ of equal dimension and meeting $V$ transversally.

Other generalizations also exist. However, it is not possible to remove the requirement that $V$ be of codimension two in the $M_i$, as the following argument shows.

A symplectic sum along a submanifold of codimension $2k$ requires a symplectic involution of a $2k$-dimensional annulus. If this involution exists, it can be used to patch two $2k$-dimensional balls together to form a symplectic $2k$-dimensional sphere. Because the sphere is a compact manifold, a symplectic form $\omega$ on it induces a nonzero cohomology class

$$[\omega] \in H^2(\mathbb{S}^{2k}, \mathbb{R}).$$

But this second cohomology group is zero unless $2k = 2$. So the symplectic sum is possible only along a submanifold of codimension two.

== Identity element ==
Given $M$ with codimension-two symplectic submanifold $V$, one may projectively complete the normal bundle of $V$ in $M$ to the $\mathbb{CP}^1$-bundle

$$P := \mathbb{P}(N_M V \oplus \mathbb{C}).$$

This $P$ contains two canonical copies of $V$: the zero-section $V_0$, which has normal bundle equal to that of $V$ in $M$, and the infinity-section $V_\infty$, which has opposite normal bundle. Therefore, one may symplectically sum $(M, V)$ with $(P, V_\infty)$; the result is again $M$, with $V_0$ now playing the role of $V$:

$$(M, V) = ((M, V) \# (P, V_\infty), V_0).$$

So for any particular pair $(M, V)$ there exists an identity element $P$ for the symplectic sum. Such identity elements have been used both in establishing theory and in computations; see below.

== Symplectic sum and cut as deformation ==
It is sometimes profitable to view the symplectic sum as a family of manifolds. In this framework, the given data $M_1$, $M_2$, $V$, $j_1$, $j_2$, $\psi$ determine a unique smooth $(2n + 2)$-dimensional symplectic manifold $Z$ and a fibration

$$Z \to D \subseteq \mathbb{C}$$

in which the central fiber is the singular space

$$Z_0 = M_1 \cup_V M_2$$

obtained by joining the summands $M_i$ along $V$, and the generic fiber $Z_\epsilon$ is a symplectic sum of the $M_i$. (That is, the generic fibers are all members of the unique isotopy class of the symplectic sum.)

Loosely speaking, one constructs this family as follows. Choose a nonvanishing holomorphic section $\eta$ of the trivial complex line bundle

$$N_{M_1} V \otimes_\mathbb{C} N_{M_2} V.$$

Then, in the direct sum

$$N_{M_1} V \oplus N_{M_2} V,$$

with $v_i$ representing a normal vector to $V$ in $M_i$, consider the locus of the quadratic equation

$$v_1 \otimes v_2 = \epsilon \eta$$

for a chosen small $\epsilon \in \mathbb{C}$. One can glue both $M_i \setminus V$ (the summands with $V$ deleted) onto this locus; the result is the symplectic sum $Z_\epsilon$.

As $\epsilon$ varies, the sums $Z_\epsilon$ naturally form the family $Z \to D$ described above. The central fiber $Z_0$ is the symplectic cut of the generic fiber. So the symplectic sum and cut can be viewed together as a quadratic deformation of symplectic manifolds.

An important example occurs when one of the summands is an identity element $P$. For then the generic fiber is a symplectic manifold $M$ and the central fiber is $M$ with the normal bundle of $V$ "pinched off at infinity" to form the $\mathbb{CP}^1$-bundle $P$. This is analogous to deformation to the normal cone along a smooth divisor $V$ in algebraic geometry. In fact, symplectic treatments of Gromov–Witten theory often use the symplectic sum/cut for "rescaling the target" arguments, while algebro-geometric treatments use deformation to the normal cone for these same arguments.

However, the symplectic sum is not a complex operation in general. The sum of two Kähler manifolds need not be Kähler.

== History and applications ==
The symplectic sum was first clearly defined in 1995 by Robert Gompf. He used it to demonstrate that any finitely presented group appears as the fundamental group of a symplectic four-manifold. Thus the category of symplectic manifolds was shown to be much larger than the category of Kähler manifolds.

Around the same time, Eugene Lerman proposed the symplectic cut as a generalization of symplectic blow up and used it to study the symplectic quotient and other operations on symplectic manifolds.

A number of researchers have subsequently investigated the behavior of pseudoholomorphic curves under symplectic sums, proving various versions of a symplectic sum formula for Gromov–Witten invariants. Such a formula aids computation by allowing one to decompose a given manifold into simpler pieces, whose Gromov–Witten invariants should be easier to compute. Another approach is to use an identity element $P$ to write the manifold $M$ as a symplectic sum

$$(M, V) = (M, V) \# (P, V_\infty).$$

A formula for the Gromov–Witten invariants of a symplectic sum then yields a recursive formula for the Gromov–Witten invariants of $M$.
