= Disc theorem =

Two embeddings of a closed k-disc into a connected n-manifold are ambient isotopic

In the area of mathematics known as differential topology, the disc theorem of Palais (1960) states that two embeddings of a closed k-disc into a connected n-manifold are ambient isotopic provided that if k = n the two embeddings are equioriented.

The disc theorem implies that the connected sum of smooth oriented manifolds is well defined.

A different although related and similar named result is the disc embedding theorem proved by Freedman in 1982.

== Sources ==
- Palais, Richard S. (1960), "Extending diffeomorphisms", Proceedings of the American Mathematical Society, 11: 274–277, doi:10.2307/2032968, ISSN 0002-9939, JSTOR 2032968, MR 0117741
