= Zariski surface =

In algebraic geometry, a branch of mathematics, a Zariski surface is a surface over a field of characteristic p > 0 such that there is a dominant inseparable map of degree p from the projective plane to the surface. In particular, all Zariski surfaces are unirational. They were named by Piotr Blass in 1977 after Oscar Zariski who used them in 1958 to give examples of unirational surfaces in characteristic p > 0 that are not rational. (In characteristic 0 by contrast, Castelnuovo's theorem implies that all unirational surfaces are rational.)

Zariski surfaces are birational to surfaces in affine 3-space A^{3} defined by irreducible polynomials of the form

$$z^p = f(x, y).\$$

The following problem was posed by Oscar Zariski in 1971: Let S be a Zariski surface with vanishing geometric genus. Is S necessarily a rational surface? For p = 2 and for p = 3 the answer to the above problem is negative as shown in 1977 by Piotr Blass in his University of Michigan Ph.D. thesis and by William E. Lang in his Harvard Ph.D. thesis in 1978. Kentaro Mitsui (2014) announced further examples giving a negative answer to Zariski's question in every characteristic p > 0. His method, however, is non-constructive at the moment and no explicit equations for p > 3 are known.

== See also ==
- List of algebraic surfaces
