= Joseph Lipman =

Canadian-American mathematician

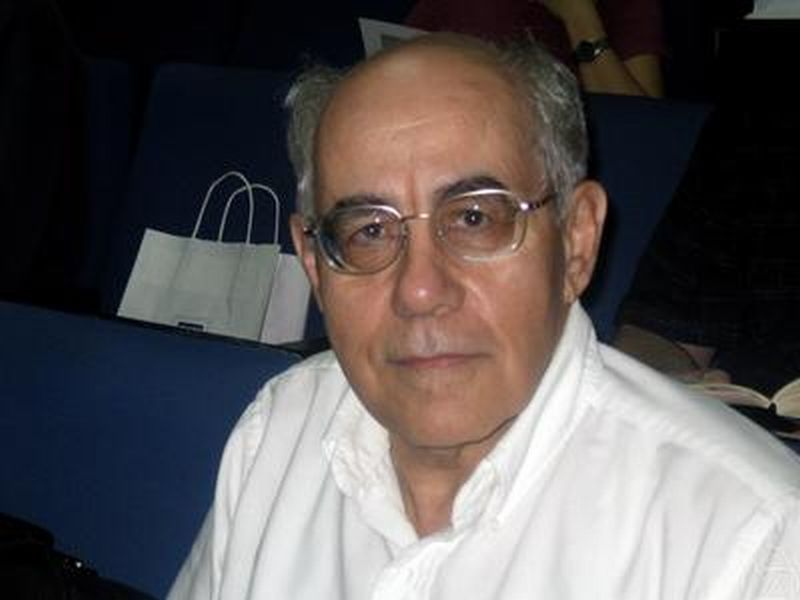
- Joseph Lipman, Segovia 2006
- Born: June 15, 1938 (age 88); Toronto, Ontario, Canada
- Education: Harvard University; University of Toronto
- Awards: Jeffery–Williams Prize (1982)
- Scientific career
- Fields: Mathematics
- Workplaces: Purdue University
- Thesis: Quasi-ordinary singularities of embedded surfaces (1965)
- Doctoral advisor: Oscar Zariski

Joseph Lipman (born June 15, 1938) is a Canadian-American mathematician, working in algebraic geometry.

Lipman graduated from the University of Toronto with a bachelor's degree in 1960 and then went to Harvard University, receiving his master's degree in 1961. He then earned a Ph.D. there in 1965 under the supervision of Oscar Zariski. In 1965 he was an assistant professor at Queen's University in Kingston and in 1966 was an assistant professor at the Purdue University, where he became professor in 1971. From 1987 to 1992, there, he was head of the mathematics department. He was a member of the MSRI and visiting scholar at the University of Cambridge and the University of Nice and a visiting professor at the Columbia University and Harvard University.

He specializes in singularity theory in algebraic geometry.

In 1958, while studying at the University of Toronto, he became a Putnam Fellow both in the spring and fall William Lowell Putnam Mathematical Competitions. In 1982 he received the Jeffery–Williams Prize. He is a fellow of the American Mathematical Society.

== Writings ==
- Collected Papers of Joseph Lipman. Queen's Papers in Pure and Applied Mathematics, vol. 117, Queen's University Press, Kingston, Ontario, 2000.
- Editor with Herwig Hauser, Frans Oort, Adolfo Quirós: Resolution of singularities. A research textbook in tribute to Oscar Zariski. Birkhäuser, Basel 2000, ISBN 3-7643-6178-6. (Progress in Mathematics. volume 181.)
- Mumford, David, ed. (1975). "Introduction to the Resolution of Singularities". Algebraic Geometry (Arcata 1974). Proc. Symp. Pure Math. Vol. 29. American Mathematical Society.
- Lipman, Joseph (1978). "Desingularization of Two-Dimensional Schemes". Annals of Mathematics. 107 (2): 151–207. doi:10.2307/1971141. JSTOR 1971141.
