= Band sum =

Method of connecting knots

In geometric topology, a band sum of two n-dimensional knots K_{1} and K_{2} along an (n + 1)-dimensional 1-handle h called a band is an n-dimensional knot K such that:

- There is an (n + 1)-dimensional 1-handle h connected to (K_{1}, K_{2}) embedded in S^{n+2}.
- There are points $p_1\in K_1$ and $p_2\in K_2$ such that $h$ is attached to $K_1\sqcup K_2$ along $p_1\sqcup p_2$.

K is the n-dimensional knot obtained by this surgery.

A band sum is thus a generalization of the usual connected sum of knots.

== See also ==
- Manifold decomposition
