= Kirwan map =

In differential geometry, the Kirwan map, introduced by British mathematician Frances Kirwan, is the homomorphism

$$H^*_G(M) \to H^*(M /\!/_p G)$$

where

- $M$ is a Hamiltonian G-space; i.e., a symplectic manifold acted by a Lie group G with a moment map $\mu: M \to {\mathfrak g}^*$.
- $H^*_G(M)$ is the equivariant cohomology ring of $M$; i.e.. the cohomology ring of the homotopy quotient $EG \times_G M$ of $M$ by $G$.
- $M /\!/_p G = \mu^{-1}(p)/G$ is the symplectic quotient of $M$ by $G$ at a regular central value $p \in Z({\mathfrak g}^*)$ of $\mu$.

It is defined as the map of equivariant cohomology induced by the inclusion $\mu^{-1}(p) \hookrightarrow M$ followed by the canonical isomorphism $H_G^*(\mu^{-1}(p)) = H^*(M /\!/_p G)$.

A theorem of Kirwan says that if $M$ is compact, then the map is surjective in rational coefficients. The analogous result holds between the K-theory of the symplectic quotient and the equivariant topological K-theory of $M$.
