= Resolution of singularities =

Concept in algebraic geometry

Strong desingularization of $X:=(x^2-y^3=0) \subset W:= \mathbf{R}^2.$ Observe that the resolution does not stop after the first blowing-up, when the strict transform is smooth, but when it is simple normal crossings with the exceptional divisors.

In algebraic geometry, the problem of resolution of singularities asks whether every algebraic variety V has a resolution, which is a non-singular variety W with a proper birational map W→V. For varieties over fields of characteristic 0, this was proved by Heisuke Hironaka in 1964; while for varieties of dimension at least 4 over fields of characteristic p, it is an open problem.

== Definitions ==
Originally the problem of resolution of singularities was to find a nonsingular model for the function field of a variety X, in other words a complete non-singular variety X′ with the same function field. In practice it is more convenient to ask for a different condition as follows: a variety X has a resolution of singularities if we can find a non-singular variety X′ and a proper birational map from X′ to X. The condition that the map is proper is needed to exclude trivial solutions, such as taking X′ to be the subvariety of non-singular points of X.

More generally, it is often useful to resolve the singularities of a variety X embedded into a larger variety W. Suppose we have a closed embedding of X into a regular variety W. A strong desingularization of X is given by a proper birational morphism from a regular variety W′ to W subject to some of the following conditions (the exact choice of conditions depends on the author):

1. The strict transform X′ of X is regular, and transverse to the exceptional locus of the resolution morphism (so in particular it resolves the singularities of X).
2. The map from the strict transform of X′ to X is an isomorphism away from the singular points of X.
3. W′ is constructed by repeatedly blowing up regular closed subvarieties of W or more strongly regular subvarieties of X, transverse to the exceptional locus of the previous blowings up.
4. The construction of W′ is functorial for smooth morphisms to W and embeddings of W into a larger variety. (It cannot be made functorial for all (not necessarily smooth) morphisms in any reasonable way.)
5. The morphism from X′ to X does not depend on the embedding of X in W. Or in general, the sequence of blowings up is functorial with respect to smooth morphisms.

Hironaka showed that there is a strong desingularization satisfying the first three conditions above whenever X is defined over a field of characteristic 0, and his construction was improved by several authors (see below) so that it satisfies all conditions above.

== Resolution of singularities of curves ==
Every algebraic curve has a unique nonsingular projective model, which means that all resolution methods are essentially the same because they all construct this model. In higher dimensions this is no longer true: varieties can have many different nonsingular projective models.

Kollár (2007) lists about 20 ways of proving resolution of singularities of curves.

=== Newton's method ===
Resolution of singularities of curves was essentially first proved by Newton (1676), who showed the existence of Puiseux series for a curve from which resolution follows easily.

=== Riemann's method ===
Riemann constructed a smooth Riemann surface from the function field of a complex algebraic curve, which gives a resolution of its singularities. This can be done over more general fields by using the set of discrete valuation rings of the field as a substitute for the Riemann surface.

=== Albanese's method ===
Albanese's method consists of taking a curve that spans a projective space of sufficiently large dimension (more than twice the degree of the curve) and repeatedly projecting down from singular points to projective spaces of smaller dimension. This method extends to higher-dimensional varieties, and shows that any n-dimensional variety has a projective model with singularities of multiplicity at most n!. For a curve, n = 1, and thus there are no singular points.

=== Normalization ===
Muhly & Zariski (1939) gave a one step method of resolving singularities of a curve by taking the normalization of the curve. Normalization removes all singularities in codimension 1, so it works for curves but not in higher dimensions.

=== Valuation rings ===
Another one-step method of resolving singularities of a curve is to take a space of valuation rings of the function field of the curve. This space can be made into a nonsingular projective curve birational to the original curve.

=== Blowing up ===
Repeatedly blowing up the singular points of a curve will eventually resolve the singularities. The main task with this method is to find a way to measure the complexity of a singularity and to show that blowing up improves this measure. There are many ways to do this. For example, one can use the arithmetic genus of the curve.

=== Noether's method ===
Noether's method takes a plane curve and repeatedly applies quadratic transformations (determined by a singular point and two points in general position). Eventually this produces a plane curve whose only singularities are ordinary multiple points (all tangent lines have multiplicity two).

=== Bertini's method ===
Bertini's method is similar to Noether's method. It starts with a plane curve, and repeatedly applies birational transformations to the plane to improve the curve. The birational transformations are more complicated than the quadratic transformations used in Noether's method, but produce the better result that the only singularities are ordinary double points.

== Resolution of singularities of surfaces ==
Surfaces have many different nonsingular projective models (unlike the case of curves where the nonsingular projective model is unique). However a surface still has a unique minimal resolution, that all others factor through (all others are resolutions of it). In higher dimensions there need not be a minimal resolution.

There were several attempts to prove resolution for surfaces over the complex numbers by Del Pezzo (1892), Levi (1899), Severi (1914), Chisini (1921), and Albanese (1924), but Zariski (1935, chapter I section 6) points out that none of these early attempts are complete, and all are vague (or even wrong) at some critical point of the argument. The first rigorous proof was given by Walker (1935), and an algebraic proof for all fields of characteristic 0 was given by Zariski (1939). Abhyankar (1956) gave a proof for surfaces of non-zero characteristic. Resolution of singularities has also been shown for all excellent 2-dimensional schemes (including all arithmetic surfaces) by Lipman (1978).

=== Zariski's method ===
Zariski's method of resolution of singularities for surfaces is to repeatedly alternate normalizing the surface (which kills codimension 1 singularities) with blowing up points (which makes codimension 2 singularities better, but may introduce new codimension 1 singularities). Although this will resolve the singularities of surfaces by itself, Zariski used a more roundabout method: he first proved a local uniformization theorem showing that every valuation of a surface could be resolved, then used the compactness of the Zariski–Riemann surface to show that it is possible to find a finite set of surfaces such that the center of each valuation is simple on at least one of these surfaces, and finally by studying birational maps between surfaces showed that this finite set of surfaces could be replaced by a single non-singular surface.

=== Jung's method ===
By applying strong embedded resolution for curves, Jung (1908) reduces to a surface with only rather special singularities (abelian quotient singularities) which are then dealt with explicitly. The higher-dimensional version of this method is de Jong's method.

=== Albanese method ===
In general the analogue of Albanese's method for curves shows that for any variety one can reduce to singularities of order at most n!, where n is the dimension. For surfaces this reduces to the case of singularities of order 2, which are easy enough to do explicitly.

=== Abhyankar's method ===
Abhyankar (1956) proved resolution of singularities for surfaces over a field of any characteristic by proving a local uniformization theorem for valuation rings. The hardest case is valuation rings of rank 1 whose valuation group is a nondiscrete subgroup of the rational numbers. The rest of the proof follows Zariski's method.

=== Hironaka's method ===
Hironaka's method for arbitrary characteristic varieties gives a resolution method for surfaces, which involves repeatedly blowing up points or smooth curves in the singular set.

=== Lipman's method ===
Lipman (1978) showed that a surface Y (a 2-dimensional reduced Noetherian scheme) has a desingularization if and only if its normalization is finite over Y and analytically normal (the completions of its singular points are normal) and has only finitely many singular points. In particular if Y is excellent then it has a desingularization.

His method was to consider normal surfaces Z with a birational proper map to Y and show that there is a minimal one with minimal possible arithmetic genus. He then shows that all singularities of this minimal Z are pseudo rational, and shows that pseudo rational singularities can be resolved by repeatedly blowing up points.

== Resolution of singularities in higher dimensions ==
The problem of resolution of singularities in higher dimensions is notorious for many incorrect published proofs and announcements of proofs that never appeared.

=== Zariski's method ===
For 3-folds the resolution of singularities was proved in characteristic 0 by Zariski (1944). He first proved a theorem about local uniformization of valuation rings, valid for varieties of any dimension over any field of characteristic 0. He then showed that the Zariski–Riemann space of valuations is quasi-compact (for any variety of any dimension over any field), implying that there is a finite family of models of any projective variety such that any valuation has a smooth center over at least one of these models. The final and hardest part of the proof, which uses the fact that the variety is of dimension 3 but which works for all characteristics, is to show that given 2 models one can find a third that resolves the singularities that each of the two given models resolve.

=== Abhyankar's method ===
Abhyankar (1966) proved resolution of singularities for 3-folds in characteristic greater than 6. The restriction on the characteristic arises because Abhyankar shows that it is possible to resolve any singularity of a 3-fold of multiplicity less than the characteristic, and then uses Albanese's method to show that singularities can be reduced to those of multiplicity at most (dimension)! = 3! = 6. Cutkosky (2009) gave a simplified version of Abhyankar's proof.

Cossart and Piltant (2008, 2009) proved resolution of singularities of 3-folds in all characteristics, by proving local uniformization in dimension at most 3, and then checking that Zariski's proof that this implies resolution for 3-folds still works in the positive characteristic case.

=== Hironaka's method ===
Resolution of singularities in characteristic 0 in all dimensions was first proved by Hironaka (1964). He proved that it was possible to resolve singularities of varieties over fields of characteristic 0 by repeatedly blowing up along non-singular subvarieties, using a very complicated argument by induction on the dimension. Simplified versions of his formidable proof were given by several people, including Bierstone & Milman (1991), Bierstone & Milman (1997), Villamayor (1992), Encinas & Villamayor (1998), Encinas & Hauser (2002), Wlodarczyk (2005), Kollár (2007). Some of the recent proofs are about a tenth of the length of Hironaka's original proof, and are easy enough to give in an introductory graduate course. For an expository account of the theorem, see (Hauser 2003) and for a historical discussion see (Hauser 2000).

=== De Jong's method ===
De Jong (1996) found a different approach to resolution of singularities, generalizing Jung's method for surfaces, which was used by Bogomolov & Pantev (1996) and by Abramovich & de Jong (1997) to prove resolution of singularities in characteristic 0. De Jong's method gave a weaker result for varieties of all dimensions in characteristic p, which is strong enough to act as a substitute for resolution for many purposes. De Jong proved that for any variety X over a field there is a dominant proper morphism which preserves the dimension from a regular variety onto X. This need not be a birational map, so is not a resolution of singularities, as it may be generically finite to one and so involves a finite extension of the function field of X. De Jong's idea was to try to represent X as a fibration over a smaller space Y with fibers that are curves (this may involve modifying X), then eliminate the singularities of Y by induction on the dimension, then eliminate the singularities in the fibers.

== Resolution for schemes and status of the problem ==
It is easy to extend the definition of resolution to all schemes. Not all schemes have resolutions of their singularities: Grothendieck & Dieudonné (1965, section 7.9) showed that if a locally Noetherian scheme X has the property that one can resolve the singularities of any finite integral scheme over X, then X must be quasi-excellent. Grothendieck also suggested that the converse might hold: in other words, if a locally Noetherian scheme X is reduced and quasi excellent, then it is possible to resolve its singularities. When X is defined over a field of characteristic 0 and is Noetherian, this follows from Hironaka's theorem, and when X has dimension at most 2 it was proved by Lipman.

Hauser (2010) gave a survey of work on the unsolved characteristic p resolution problem.

== Method of proof in characteristic zero ==
The lingering perception that the proof of resolution is very hard gradually diverged from reality. ... it is feasible to prove resolution in the last two weeks of a beginning algebraic geometry course.

— (Kollár 2007, Lectures on Resolution of Singularities)

There are many constructions of strong desingularization but all of them give essentially the same result. In every case the global object (the variety to be desingularized) is replaced by local data (the ideal sheaf of the variety and those of the exceptional divisors and some orders that represents how much should be resolved the ideal in that step). With this local data the centers of blowing-up are defined. The centers will be defined locally and therefore it is a problem to guarantee that they will match up into a global center. This can be done by defining what blowings-up are allowed to resolve each ideal. Done appropriately, this will make the centers match automatically. Another way is to define a local invariant depending on the variety and the history of the resolution (the previous local centers) so that the centers consist of the maximum locus of the invariant. The definition of this is made such that making this choice is meaningful, giving smooth centers transversal to the exceptional divisors.

In either case the problem is reduced to resolve singularities of the tuple formed by the ideal sheaf and the extra data (the exceptional divisors and the order, d, to which the resolution should go for that ideal). This tuple is called a marked ideal and the set of points in which the order of the ideal is larger than d is called its co-support. The proof that there is a resolution for the marked ideals is done by induction on dimension. The induction breaks in two steps:

1. Functorial desingularization of marked ideal of dimension n − 1 implies functorial desingularization of marked ideals of maximal order of dimension n.
2. Functorial desingularization of marked ideals of maximal order of dimension n implies functorial desingularization of (a general) marked ideal of dimension n.

Here we say that a marked ideal is of maximal order if at some point of its co-support the order of the ideal is equal to d. A key ingredient in the strong resolution is the use of the Hilbert–Samuel function of the local rings of the points in the variety. This is one of the components of the resolution invariant.

== Examples ==
=== Multiplicity need not decrease under blowup ===
The most obvious invariant of a singularity is its multiplicity. However this need not decrease under blowup, so it is necessary to use more subtle invariants to measure the improvement.

For example, the rhamphoid cusp y^{2} = x^{5} has a singularity of order 2 at the origin. After blowing up at its singular point it becomes the ordinary cusp y^{2} = x^{3}, which still has multiplicity 2.

It is clear that the singularity has improved, since the degree of defining polynomial has decreased. This does not happen in general. An example where it does not is given by the isolated singularity of x^{2} + y^{3}z + z^{3} = 0 at the origin. Blowing it up gives the singularity x^{2} + y^{2}z + yz^{3} = 0. It is not immediately obvious that this new singularity is better, as both singularities have multiplicity 2 and are given by the sum of monomials of degrees 2, 3, and 4.

=== Blowing up the most singular points does not work ===
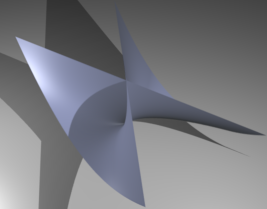
Whitney umbrella

A natural idea for improving singularities is to blow up the locus of the "worst" singular points. The Whitney umbrella x^{2} = y^{2}z has singular set the z axis, most of whose point are ordinary double points, but there is a more complicated pinch point singularity at the origin, so blowing up the worst singular points suggests that one should start by blowing up the origin. However blowing up the origin reproduces the same singularity on one of the coordinate charts. So blowing up the (apparently) "worst" singular points does not improve the singularity. Instead the singularity can be resolved by blowing up along the z-axis.

There are algorithms that work by blowing up the "worst" singular points in some sense, such as (Bierstone & Milman 1997), but this example shows that the definition of the "worst" points needs to be quite subtle.

For more complicated singularities, such as x^{2} = y^{m}z^{n} which is singular along x = yz =0, blowing up the worst singularity at the origin produces the singularities x^{2} = y^{m+n−2}z^{n} and x^{2} = y^{m}z^{m+n−2} which are worse than the original singularity if m and n are both at least 3.

After resolution, the total transform (the union of the strict transform and the exceptional divisors) is a variety with singularities of the simple normal crossings type. It is natural to consider the possibility of resolving singularities without resolving this type of singularities, this is finding a resolution that is an isomorphism over the set of smooth and simple normal crossing points. When the strict transform is a divisor (i.e., can be embedded as a codimension one subvariety in a smooth variety) it is known that there exists a strong resolution avoiding simple normal crossing points. Whitney's umbrella shows that it is not possible to resolve singularities avoiding blowing-up the normal crossings singularities.

=== Incremental resolution procedures need memory ===
A natural way to resolve singularities is to repeatedly blow up some canonically chosen smooth subvariety. This runs into the following problem. The singular set of x^{2} = y^{2}z^{2} is the pair of lines given by the y and z axes. The only reasonable varieties to blow up are the origin, one of these two axes, or the whole singular set (both axes). However the whole singular set cannot be used since it is not smooth, and choosing one of the two axes breaks the symmetry between them so is not canonical. This means we have to start by blowing up the origin, but this reproduces the original singularity, so we seem to be going round in circles.

The solution to this problem is that although blowing up the origin does not change the type of the singularity, it does give a subtle improvement: it breaks the symmetry between the two singular axes because one of them is an exceptional divisor for a previous blowup, so it is now permissible to blow up just one of these. However, in order to exploit this the resolution procedure needs to treat these 2 singularities differently, even though they are locally the same. This is sometimes done by giving the resolution procedure some memory, so the center of the blowup at each step depends not only on the singularity, but on the previous blowups used to produce it.

=== Resolutions are not functorial ===
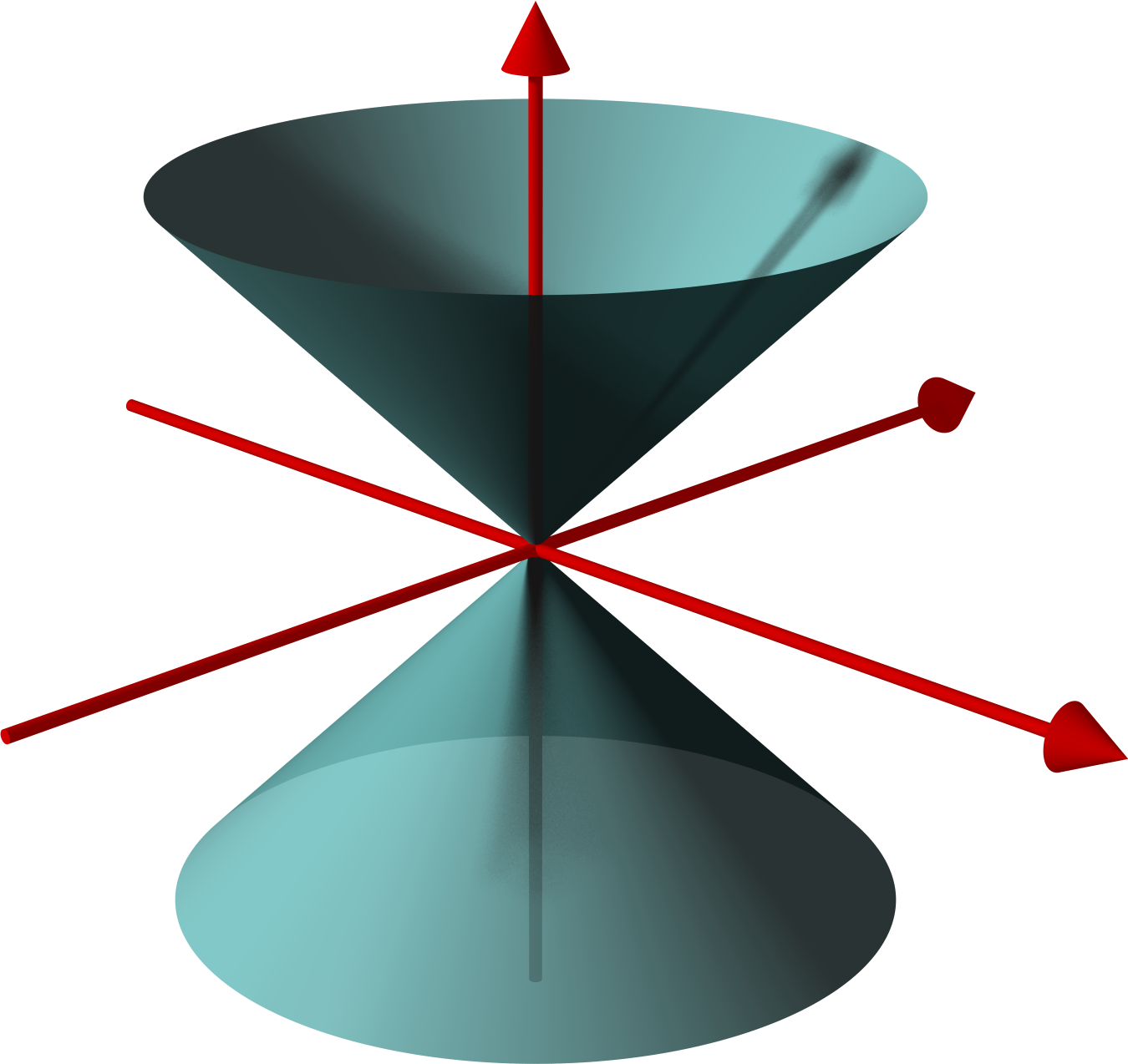
Conical singularity x^{2} + y^{2} = z^{2}

Some resolution methods (in characteristic 0) are functorial for all smooth morphisms. However it is not possible to find a strong resolution functorial for all (possibly non-smooth) morphisms. An example is given by the map from the affine plane A^{2} to the conical singularity x^{2} + y^{2} = z^{2} taking (X,Y) to (2XY, X^{2} − Y^{2}, X^{2} + Y^{2}). The XY-plane is already nonsingular so should not be changed by resolution, and any resolution of the conical singularity factorizes through the minimal resolution given by blowing up the singular point. However the rational map from the XY-plane to this blowup does not extend to a regular map.

=== Minimal resolutions need not exist ===
Minimal resolutions (resolutions such that every resolution factors through them) exist in dimensions 1 and 2, but not always in higher dimensions. The Atiyah flop gives an example in 3 dimensions of a singularity with no minimal resolution. Let Y be the zeros of xy = zw in A^{4}, and let V be the blowup of Y at the origin. The exceptional locus of this blowup is isomorphic to P^{1}×P^{1}, and can be blown down to P^{1} in 2 different ways, giving two small resolutions X_{1} and X_{2} of Y, neither of which can be blown down any further.

=== Resolutions should not commute with products ===
Kollár (2007, example 3.4.4, page 121) gives the following example showing that one cannot expect a sufficiently good resolution procedure to commute with products. If f:A→B is the blowup of the origin of a quadric cone B in affine 3-space, then f×f:A×A→B×B cannot be produced by an étale local resolution procedure, essentially because the exceptional locus has 2 components that intersect.

=== Singularities of toric varieties ===
Singularities of toric varieties give examples of high-dimensional singularities that are easy to resolve explicitly. A toric variety is defined by a fan, a collection of cones in a lattice. The singularities can be resolved by subdividing each cone into a union of cones each of which is generated by a basis for the lattice, and taking the corresponding toric variety.

=== Choosing centers that are regular subvarieties of X ===
Construction of a desingularization of a variety X may not produce centers of blowings up that are smooth subvarieties of X. Many constructions of a desingularization of an abstract variety X proceed by locally embedding X in a smooth variety W, considering its ideal in W and computing a canonical desingularization of this ideal. The desingularization of ideals uses the order of the ideal as a measure of how singular is the ideal. The desingularization of the ideal can be made such that one can justify that the local centers patch together to give global centers. This method leads to a proof that is relatively simpler to present, compared to Hironaka's original proof, which uses the Hilbert-Samuel function as the measure of how bad singularities are. For example, the proofs in Villamayor (1992), Encinas & Villamayor (1998), Encinas & Hauser (2002), and Kollár (2007) use this idea. However, this method only ensures centers of blowings up that are regular in W.

The following example shows that this method can produce centers that have non-smooth intersections with the (strict transform of) X. Therefore, the resulting desingularization, when restricted to the abstract variety X, is not obtained by blowing up regular subvarieties of X.

Let X be the subvariety of the four-dimensional affine plane, with coordinates x,y,z,w, generated by y^{2}-x^{3} and x^{4}+xz^{2}-w^{3}. The canonical desingularization of the ideal with these generators would blow up the center C_{0} given by x=y=z=w=0. The transform of the ideal in the x-chart if generated by x-y^{2} and y^{2}(y^{2}+z^{2}-w^{3}). The next center of blowing up C_{1} is given by x=y=0. However, the strict transform of X is X_{1}, which is generated by x-y^{2} and y^{2}+z^{2}-w^{3}. This means that the intersection of C_{1} and X_{1} is given by x=y=0 and z^{2}-w^{3}=0, which is not regular.

To produce centers of blowings up that are regular subvarieties of X stronger proofs use the Hilbert-Samuel function of the local rings of X rather than the order of its ideal in the local embedding in W.

== Other variants of resolutions of singularities ==
After the resolution the total transform, the union of the strict transform, X, and the exceptional divisor, is a variety that can be made, at best, to have simple normal crossing singularities. Then it is natural to consider the possibility of resolving singularities without resolving this type of singularities. The problem is to find a resolution that is an isomorphism over the set of smooth and simple normal crossing points. When X is a divisor, i.e. it can be embedded as a codimension-one subvariety in a smooth variety it is known to be true the existence of the strong resolution avoiding simple normal crossing points. The general case or generalizations to avoid different types of singularities are still not known.

Avoiding certain singularities is impossible. For example, one can't resolve singularities avoiding blowing-up the normal crossings singularities. In fact, to resolve the pinch point singularity the whole singular locus needs to be blown up, including points where normal crossing singularities are present.
