= Local uniformization =

Concept related to resolving singularities in algebraic geometry

In algebraic geometry, local uniformization is a weak form of resolution of singularities, stating that a variety can be desingularized near any valuation, or in other words that the Zariski–Riemann space of the array is in some sense non-singular. Local uniformization was introduced by Zariski (1939, 1940), who separated the problem of resolving the singularities of a variety into the problem of local uniformization and the problem of combining the local uniformizations into a global desingularization.

Local uniformization of a variety at a valuation of its function field means finding a projective model of the variety such that the center of the valuation is non-singular. It is weaker than resolution of singularities: if there is a resolution of singularities then this is a model such that the center of every valuation is non-singular. Zariski (1944b) proved that if one can show local uniformization of a variety then one can find a finite number of models such that every valuation has a non-singular center on at least one of these models. To complete a proof of resolution of singularities, it is then sufficient to show that one can combine these finite models into a single model, but this seems rather hard. (Local uniformization at a valuation does not directly imply resolution at the center of the valuation: roughly speaking; it only implies resolution in a sort of "wedge" near this point, and it seems hard to combine the resolutions of different wedges into a resolution at a point.)

Zariski (1940) proved local uniformization of varieties in any dimension over fields of characteristic 0, and used this to prove resolution of singularities for varieties in characteristic 0 of dimension at most 3. Local uniformization in positive characteristic seems to be much harder. Abhyankar (1956, 1966) proved local uniformization in all characteristics for surfaces and in characteristics at least 7 for 3-folds, and was able to deduce global resolution of singularities in these cases from this. Cutkosky (2009) simplified Abhyankar's long proof. Cossart and Piltant (2008, 2009) extended Abhyankar's proof of local uniformization of 3-folds to the remaining characteristics 2, 3, and 5. Temkin (2013) showed that it is possible to find a local uniformization of any valuation after taking a purely inseparable extension of the function field.

Local uniformization in positive characteristic for varieties of dimension at least 4 is (as of 2019) an open problem.
