= Infinitely near point =

Concept in algebraic geometry

In algebraic geometry, an infinitely near point of an algebraic surface S is a point on a surface obtained from S by repeatedly blowing up points. Infinitely near points of algebraic surfaces were introduced by Max Noether (1876).

There are some other meanings of "infinitely near point". Infinitely near points can also be defined for higher-dimensional varieties: there are several inequivalent ways to do this, depending on what one is allowed to blow up. Weil gave a definition of infinitely near points of smooth varieties, though these are not the same as infinitely near points in algebraic geometry. In the line of hyperreal numbers, an extension of the real number line, two points are called infinitely near if their difference is infinitesimal.

== Definition ==
When blowing up is applied to a point P on a surface S, the new surface S* contains a whole curve C where P used to be. The points of C have the geometric interpretation as the tangent directions at P to S. They can be called infinitely near to P as way of visualizing them on S, rather than S*. More generally this construction can be iterated by blowing up a point on the new curve C, and so on.

An infinitely near point (of order n) P_{n} on a surface S_{0} is given by a sequence of points P_{0}, P_{1},...,P_{n} on surfaces S_{0}, S_{1},...,S_{n} such that S_{i} is given by blowing up S_{i–1} at the point P_{i–1} and P_{i} is a point of the surface S_{i} with image P_{i–1}.

In particular the points of the surface S are the infinitely near points on S of order 0.

Infinitely near points correspond to 1-dimensional valuations of the function field of S with 0-dimensional center, and in particular correspond to some of the points of the Zariski–Riemann surface. (The 1-dimensional valuations with 1-dimensional center correspond to irreducible curves of S.) It is also possible to iterate the construction infinitely often, producing an infinite sequence P_{0}, P_{1},... of infinitely near points. These infinite sequences correspond to the 0-dimensional valuations of the function field of the surface, which correspond to the "0-dimensional" points of the Zariski–Riemann surface.

== Applications ==
If C and D are distinct irreducible curves on a smooth surface S intersecting at a point p, then the multiplicity of their intersection at p is given by
$$\sum_{x \text{ infinitely near }p} m_x(C)m_x(D)$$
where m_{x}(C) is the multiplicity of C at x. In general this is larger than m_{p}(C)m_{p}(D) if C and D have a common tangent line at x so that they also intersect at infinitely near points of order greater than 0, for example if C is the line y = 0 and D is the parabola y = x^{2} and p = (0,0).

The genus of C is given by
$$g(C)=g(N)+\sum_{\text{infinitely near points }x}m_x(m_x-1)/2$$
where N is the normalization of C and m_{x} is the multiplicity of the infinitely near point x on C.
