= Connected sum =

Way to join two given mathematical manifolds together

Illustration of connected sum.

In mathematics, specifically in topology, the operation of connected sum is a geometric modification on manifolds. Its effect is to join two given manifolds together near a chosen point on each. This construction plays a key role in the classification of closed surfaces.

More generally, one can also join manifolds together along identical submanifolds; this generalization is often called the fiber sum.

There is also a closely related notion of a connected sum on knots, called the knot sum or composition of knots.

== Connected sum at a point ==
A connected sum of two m-dimensional manifolds is a manifold formed by deleting a ball inside each manifold and gluing together the resulting boundary spheres.

If both manifolds are oriented, there is a unique connected sum defined by having the gluing map reverse orientation. Although the construction uses the choice of the balls, the result is unique up to homeomorphism. One can also make this operation work in the smooth category, and then the result is unique up to diffeomorphism. There are subtle problems in the smooth case: not every diffeomorphism between the boundaries of the spheres gives the same composite manifold, even if the orientations are chosen correctly. For example, Milnor showed that two 7-cells can be glued along their boundary so that the result is an exotic sphere homeomorphic but not diffeomorphic to a 7-sphere.

However, there is a canonical way to choose the gluing of $M_1$ and $M_2$ which gives a unique well-defined connected sum. Choose embeddings $i_1 : D_n \rightarrow M_1$ and $i_2 : D_n \rightarrow M_2$ so that $i_1$ preserves orientation and $i_2$ reverses orientation. Now obtain $M_1 \mathbin{\#} M_2$ from the disjoint sum
$$(M_1 - i_1(0)) \sqcup (M_2 - i_2(0))$$
by identifying $i_1(tu)$ with $i_2((1 - t)u)$ for each unit vector $u \in S^{n-1}$ and each $0 < t < 1$. Choose the orientation for $M_1 \mathbin{\#} M_2$ which is compatible with $M_1$ and $M_2$. The fact that this construction is well-defined depends crucially on the disc theorem, which is not at all obvious. For further details, see Kosinski, Differential Manifolds.

The operation of connected sum is denoted by $\#$.

The operation of connected sum has the sphere $S^m$ as an identity; that is, $M \mathbin{\#} S^m$ is homeomorphic (or diffeomorphic) to $M$.

The classification of closed surfaces, a foundational and historically significant result in topology, states that any closed surface can be expressed as the connected sum of a sphere with some number $g$ of tori and some number $k$ of real projective planes.

== Connected sum along a submanifold ==
The connected sum can be defined along a submanifold.

Let $M_1$ and $M_2$ be two smooth, oriented manifolds of equal dimension and $V$ a smooth, closed, oriented manifold, embedded as a submanifold into both $M_1$ and $M_2.$ Suppose furthermore that there exists an isomorphism of normal bundles
$$\psi: N_{M_1} V \to N_{M_2} V$$
that reverses the orientation on each fiber. Then $\psi$ induces an orientation-preserving diffeomorphism
$$N_1 \setminus V \cong N_{M_1} V \setminus V \to N_{M_2} V \setminus V \cong N_2 \setminus V,$$
where each normal bundle $N_{M_i} V$ is diffeomorphically identified with a neighborhood $N_i$ of $V$ in $M_i$, and the map
$$N_{M_1} V \setminus V \to N_{M_2} V \setminus V$$
is the orientation-reversing diffeomorphic involution
$$v \mapsto v / |v|^2$$
on normal vectors. The connected sum of $M_1$ and $M_2$ along $V$ is then the space
$$(M_1 \setminus V) \bigcup_{N_1 \setminus V = N_2 \setminus V} (M_2 \setminus V)$$
obtained by gluing the deleted neighborhoods together by the orientation-preserving diffeomorphism. The sum is often denoted
$$(M_1, V) \mathbin{\#} (M_2, V).$$
Its diffeomorphism type depends on the choice of the two embeddings of $V$ and on the choice of $\psi$.

Loosely speaking, each normal fiber of the submanifold $V$ contains a single point of $V$, and the connected sum along $V$ is simply the connected sum as described in the preceding section, performed along each fiber. For this reason, the connected sum along $V$ is often called the fiber sum.

The special case of $V$ a point recovers the connected sum of the preceding section.

== Connected sum along a codimension-two submanifold ==
Another important special case occurs when the dimension of $V$ is two less than that of the $M_i$. Then the isomorphism $\psi$ of normal bundles exists whenever their Euler classes are opposite:
$$e\left(N_{M_1} V\right) = -e\left(N_{M_2} V\right).$$

Furthermore, in this case the structure group of the normal bundles is the circle group $SO(2)$; it follows that the choice of embeddings can be canonically identified with the group of homotopy classes of maps from $V$ to the circle, which in turn equals the first integral cohomology group $H^1(V)$. So the diffeomorphism type of the sum depends on the choice of $\psi$ and a choice of element from $H^1(V)$.

A connected sum along a codimension-two $V$ can also be carried out in the category of symplectic manifolds; this elaboration is called the symplectic sum.

== Local operation ==
The connected sum is a local operation on manifolds, meaning that it alters the summands only in a neighborhood of $V$. This implies, for example, that the sum can be carried out on a single manifold $M$ containing two disjoint copies of $V$, with the effect of gluing $M$ to itself. For example, the connected sum of a 2-sphere at two distinct points of the sphere produces the 2-torus.

== Connected sum of knots ==
There is a closely related notion of the connected sum of two knots. In fact, if one regards a knot merely as a 1-manifold, then the connected sum of two knots is just their connected sum as a 1-dimensional manifold. However, the essential property of a knot is not its manifold structure (under which every knot is equivalent to a circle) but rather its embedding into the ambient space. So the connected sum of knots has a more elaborate definition that produces a well-defined embedding, as follows.

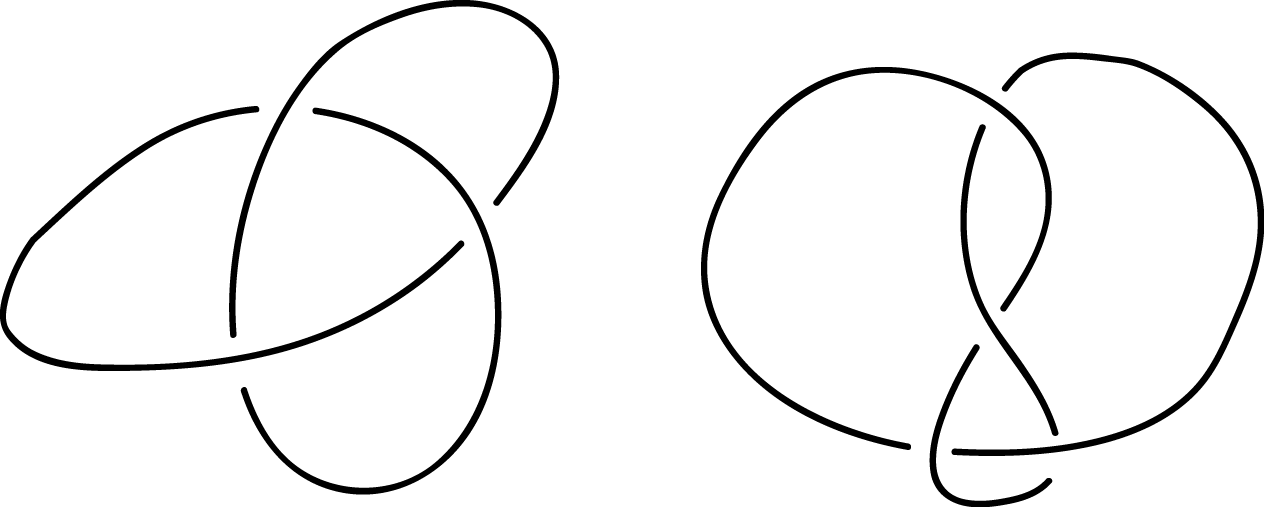
Consider disjoint planar projections of each knot.

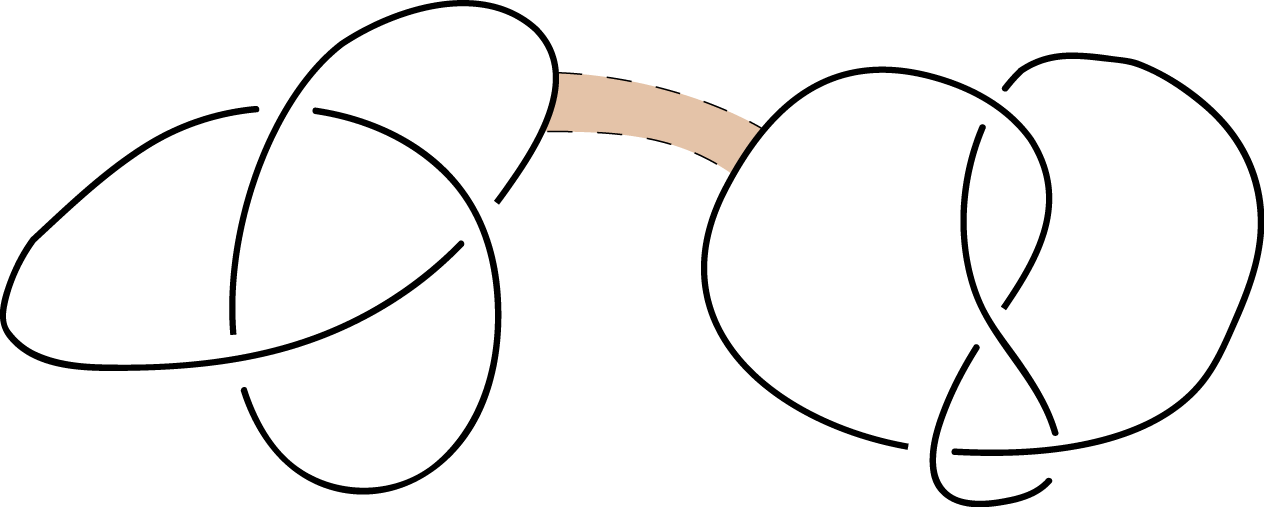
Find a rectangle in the plane where one pair of sides are arcs along each knot but is otherwise disjoint from the knots.

Now join the two knots together by deleting these arcs from the knots and adding the arcs that form the other pair of sides of the rectangle.

This procedure results in the projection of a new knot, a connected sum (or knot sum, or composition) of the original knots. For the connected sum of knots to be well defined, one has to consider oriented knots in 3-space. To define the connected sum for two oriented knots:

1. Consider a planar projection of each knot and suppose these projections are disjoint.
2. Find a rectangle in the plane where one pair of sides are arcs along each knot but is otherwise disjoint from the knots and so that the arcs of the knots on the sides of the rectangle are oriented around the boundary of the rectangle in the same direction.
3. Now join the two knots together by deleting these arcs from the knots and adding the arcs that form the other pair of sides of the rectangle.

The resulting connected sum knot inherits an orientation consistent with the orientations of the two original knots, and the oriented ambient isotopy class of the result is well-defined, depending only on the oriented ambient isotopy classes of the original two knots.

Under this operation, oriented knots in 3-space form a commutative monoid with unique prime factorization, which allows us to define what is meant by a prime knot. Proof of commutativity can be seen by letting one summand shrink until it is very small and then pulling it along the other knot. The unknot is the unit. The two trefoil knots are the simplest prime knots. Higher-dimensional knots can be added by splicing the $n$-spheres.

In three dimensions, the unknot cannot be written as the sum of two non-trivial knots. This fact follows from additivity of knot genus; another proof relies on an infinite construction sometimes called the Mazur swindle. In higher dimensions (with codimension at least three), it is possible to get an unknot by adding two nontrivial knots.

If one does not take into account the orientations of the knots, the connected sum operation is not well-defined on isotopy classes of (nonoriented) knots. To see this, consider two noninvertible knots K, L which are not equivalent (as unoriented knots); for example take the two pretzel knots K = P(3, 5, 7) and L = P(3, 5, 9). Let K_{+} and K_{−} be K with its two inequivalent orientations, and let L_{+} and L_{−} be L with its two inequivalent orientations. There are four oriented connected sums we may form:

- A = K_{+} # L_{+}
- B = K_{−} # L_{−}
- C = K_{+} # L_{−}
- D = K_{−} # L_{+}

The oriented ambient isotopy classes of these four oriented knots are all distinct, and, when one considers ambient isotopy of the knots without regard to orientation, there are two distinct equivalence classes: {A ~ B} and {C ~ D}. To see that A and B are unoriented equivalent, simply note that they both may be constructed from the same pair of disjoint knot projections as above, the only difference being the orientations of the knots. Similarly, one sees that C and D may be constructed from the same pair of disjoint knot projections.

== See also ==
- Band sum
- Prime decomposition (3-manifold)
- Manifold decomposition
- Satellite knot
