= Cartan formula =

Mathematical formulae

The Cartan formula in mathematics may refer to two different formulae in differential geometry or algebraic topology.

== Cartan formula in differential geometry ==
The Cartan formula in differential geometry states:

$\mathcal L_X = \mathrm d \, \iota_X + \iota_X \mathrm d$, where $\mathcal L_X, \mathrm d$, and $\iota_X$ are Lie derivative, exterior derivative, and interior product, respectively, acting on differential forms.

It is also called the Cartan homotopy formula or Cartan magic formula. This formula is named after Élie Cartan.

== Cartan formula in algebraic topology ==
The Cartan formula in algebraic topology is one of the five axioms of Steenrod algebra. (Note: More precisely, these five axioms define cohomology operations, which are natural transformations between cohomology functors, which in turn define Steenrod algebra.) It reads:

$$\begin{align}
Sq^n(x \smile y) & = \sum_{i+j=n} (Sq^i x) \smile (Sq^j y) \quad \text{or} \\ P^n(x \smile y) & = \sum_{i+j=n} (P^i x) \smile (P^j y)
\end{align}$$.

The name derives from Henri Cartan, son of Élie.

== See also ==
- List of things named after Élie Cartan
