= Zariski–Riemann space =

Concept in algebraic geometry

In algebraic geometry, a Zariski–Riemann space or Zariski space of a subring k of a field K is a locally ringed space whose points are valuation rings containing k and contained in K. They generalize the Riemann surface of a complex curve.

Zariski–Riemann spaces were introduced by Zariski (1940, 1944) who (rather confusingly) called them Riemann manifolds or Riemann surfaces. They were named Zariski–Riemann spaces after Oscar Zariski and Bernhard Riemann by Nagata (1962) who used them to show that algebraic varieties can be embedded in complete ones.

Local uniformization (proved in characteristic 0 by Zariski) can be interpreted as saying that the Zariski–Riemann space of a variety is nonsingular in some sense, so is a sort of rather weak resolution of singularities. This does not solve the problem of resolution of singularities because in dimensions greater than 1 the Zariski–Riemann space is not locally affine and in particular is not a scheme.

== Definition ==
The Zariski–Riemann space of a field K over a base field k is a locally ringed space whose points are the valuation rings containing k and contained in K. Sometimes the valuation ring K itself is excluded, and sometimes the points are restricted to the zero-dimensional valuation rings (those whose residue field has transcendence degree zero over k).

If S is the Zariski–Riemann space of a subring k of a field K, it has a topology defined by taking a basis of open sets to be the valuation rings containing a given finite subset of K. The space S is quasi-compact. It is made into a locally ringed space by assigning to any open subset the intersection of the valuation rings of the points of the subset. The local ring at any point is the corresponding valuation ring.

The Zariski–Riemann space of a function field can also be constructed as the inverse limit of all complete (or projective) models of the function field.

== Examples ==
=== The Zariski-Riemann space of a curve ===
The Zariski-Riemann space of the function field K of a curve over k is the same as the nonsingular projective model of it. It has one generic non-closed point corresponding to the trivial valuation with valuation ring K, and its other points are the rank 1 valuation rings in K containing k. Unlike the higher-dimensional cases, the Zariski–Riemann space of a curve is a scheme.

=== The Zariski-Riemann space of a surface ===
The valuation rings of a surface S over k with function field K can be classified by the dimension (the transcendence degree of the residue field) and the rank (the number of nonzero convex subgroups of the valuation group). Zariski (1939) gave the following classification:

- Dimension 2. The only possibility is the trivial valuation with rank 0, valuation group 0 and valuation ring K.
- Dimension 1, rank 1. These correspond to divisors on some blowup of S, or in other words to divisors and infinitely near points of S. They are all discrete. The center in S can be either a point or a curve. The valuation group is Z.
- Dimension 0, rank 2. These correspond to germs of algebraic curves through a point on a normal model of S. The valuation group is isomorphic to Z+Z with the lexicographic order.
- Dimension 0, rank 1, discrete. These correspond to germs of non-algebraic curves (given for example by y= a non-algebraic formal power series in x) through a point of a normal model. The valuation group is Z.
- Dimension 0, rank 1, non-discrete, value group has incommensurable elements. These correspond to germs of transcendental curves such as y=x^{π} through a point of a normal model. The value group is isomorphic to an ordered group generated by 2 incommensurable real numbers.
- Dimension 0, rank 1, non-discrete, value group elements are commensurable. The value group can be isomorphic to any dense subgroup of the rational numbers. These correspond to germs of curves of the form y=Σa_{n}x^{b_{n}} where the numbers b_{n} are rational with unbounded denominators.
