= Exceptional divisor =

In mathematics, specifically algebraic geometry, an exceptional divisor for a regular map

$$f: X \rightarrow Y$$

of varieties is a kind of 'large' subvariety of $X$ which is 'crushed' by $f$, in a certain definite sense. More strictly, f has an associated exceptional locus which describes how it identifies nearby points in codimension one, and the exceptional divisor is an appropriate algebraic construction whose support is the exceptional locus. The same ideas can be found in the theory of holomorphic mappings of complex manifolds.

More precisely, suppose that

$$f: X \rightarrow Y$$

is a regular map of varieties which is birational (that is, it is an isomorphism between open subsets of $X$ and $Y$). A codimension-1 subvariety $Z \subset X$ is said to be exceptional if $f(Z)$ has codimension at least 2 as a subvariety of $Y$. One may then define the exceptional divisor of $f$ to be

$$\sum_i Z_i \in Div(X),$$

where the sum is over all exceptional subvarieties of $f$, and is an element of the group of Weil divisors on $X$.

Consideration of exceptional divisors is crucial in birational geometry: an elementary result (see for instance Shafarevich, II.4.4) shows (under suitable assumptions) that any birational regular map that is not an isomorphism has an exceptional divisor. A particularly important example is the blowup

$$\sigma: \tilde{X} \rightarrow X$$

of a subvariety

$W \subset X$:

in this case the exceptional divisor is exactly the preimage of $W$.
