= Hiroaki Terao =

Japanese mathematician (born 1951)

- Born: August 13, 1951 (age 75); Tokyo, Japan
- Education: University of Tokyo; Kyoto University
- Known for: Arrangement of hyperplanes
- Awards: MSJ Algebra Prize (2010)
- Scientific career
- Fields: Mathematics
- Workplaces: International Christian University; University of Wisconsin–Madison; Tokyo Metropolitan University; Hokkaido University
- Doctoral advisor: Kyoji Saito

Hiroaki Terao (寺尾 宏明, Hiroaki Terao; born August 13, 1951) is a Japanese mathematician, known as, with Peter Orlik and Louis Solomon, a pioneer of the theory of arrangements of hyperplanes. He was awarded a Mathematical Society of Japan Algebra Prize in 2010.

== Education ==
Terao started his studies at the University of Tokyo, where he earned in 1974 his bachelor's degree and in 1976 his master's degree. For his graduate studies he went to Kyoto University, where he earned in 1981 his Ph.D. degree, with a thesis written under the supervision of Kyoji Saito.

== Career ==
He held teaching positions at International Christian University (1977–1991), University of Wisconsin–Madison (1990–1999), Tokyo Metropolitan University (1998–2006), and Hokkaido University (1996–1998, 2006–2015). He was dean of the school of science of Hokkaido University (2013–2015), after which he became vice president of Hokkaido University (2015–2017). He has been a professor emeritus at Hokkaido University since 2017. He is currently a guest professor at Tokyo Metropolitan University.

== Research ==
In 1983, Terao asked whether the freeness of an arrangement is determined from its intersection lattice. This problem is now known as the Terao conjecture, and is still open.

== Books ==
- Orlik, Peter; Terao, Hiroaki (1992). Arrangements of Hyperplanes. Grundlehren der mathematischen Wissenschaften. Berlin, Heidelberg: Springer. doi:10.1007/978-3-662-02772-1. ISBN 978-3-642-08137-8. ISSN 0072-7830. MR 1217488.
- Orlik, Peter; Terao, Hiroaki (2007) [2001]. Arrangements and hypergeometric integrals. MSJ Memoirs. Vol. 9 (2nd ed.). Tokyo: Mathematical Society of Japan. ISBN 978-4-931469-10-5. MR 2325213.
