= Reiko =

- Pronunciation: Reiko
- Gender: Female

Origin
- Origin: Japanese
- Region of origin: Japanese

Reiko is a feminine Japanese given name. A few possible ways to spell the name in Japanese are: (れいこ, レイコ, 麗子, 怜子, 伶子, 玲子, 令子, 礼子, 禮子, 冷子). Notable people with the name include:

- Reiko Aonuma (青沼 令子; born 1954), Japanese women's basketball player
- Reiko Aylesworth (born 1972), an American actress
- Reiko Chiba (千葉 麗子; born 1975), J-pop idol
- Reiko Dan (団 令子; 1935-2003), Japanese actress
- Reiko Douglas (Hashimoto) Japanese singer and comic, wife of Emmy-winning comedy writer Jack Douglas
- Reiko Ezoe (江副 令子; born 1942), Japanese sprinter
- Reiko Fujita (born 1972), Japanese archer
- Reiko Hayama (葉山 レイコ; born 1969), Japanese av actress
- Reiko Hiura (樋浦 令子; born 1984), Japanese table tennis player
- Reiko Ike (池 玲子; born 1953), Japanese actress and singer
- Reiko Kataoka (片岡 礼子; born 1971), Japanese actress
- Reiko Katsura, an actor
- Reiko Kiuchi (木内 レイコ; born 1968), Japanese voice actress
- Reiko Kobayashi (小林 れい子; born 1961), Japanese figure skater and coach
- Reiko Kobayashi (Go player) (小林 禮子; 1939–1996), Japanese Go player
- Reiko Kudo (工藤 礼子), a Japanese singer with the group Maher Shalal Hash Baz
- Reiko Kuroda (黒田 玲子; born 1947), Japanese chemist and professor at University of Tokyo
- Reiko Kusamura (草村 礼子; born 1940), Japanese actress
- Reiko Miyaoka (宮岡 礼子; born 1951), Japanese mathematician and professor
- Reiko Momochi (ももち 麗子), Japanese shōjo manga artist
- Reiko Mori (森 禮子; 1928-2014), Japanese novelist and playwright
- Reiko Mutō (武藤 礼子; 1935–2006), Japanese actress and voice actress
- Reiko Nakamura (中村 礼子; born 1982), Japanese swimmer, bronze medalist in the 2004 Summer Olympics
- Reiko Nakano (born 1983), Japanese violinist, founder of Strings
- Reiko Obata Japanese-American koto performer and composer
- Reiko Ohara (大原 麗子; 1946–2009), Japanese actress
- Reiko Okano (岡野 玲子; born 1960), Japanese manga artist
- Reiko Okutani (奥谷 禮子; born 1950), Japanese businesswoman
- Reiko Okuyama (奥山 玲子; 1936–2007), Japanese animator
- Reiko Ōmori (大森 玲子; born 1984), Japanese voice actress and J-pop idol
- Reiko Ōsawa (大沢 礼子; 1915–2010), Japanese diver
- Reiko Oshida (大信田 礼子; born 1948), Japanese actress and singer
- Reiko Sakamoto (mathematician) (坂本 玲子; born 1939), Japanese mathematician
- Reiko Sakamoto (table tennis) (阪本 礼子; born 1950/1951), Japanese former international table tennis player
- Reiko Sato (佐藤 レイコ; 1931–1981), American dancer and actress
- Reiko Shimizu (清水 玲子; born 1963), Japanese shōjo manga writer and illustrator
- Reiko Shiota (潮田 玲子; born 1983), Japanese badminton player
- Reiko Suzuki (Scouting) (鈴木 れい子), serves as the Deputy National Commissioner of the Scout Association of Japan
- Reiko Suzuki (鈴木 れい子; born 1944), Japanese voice actress
- Reiko Takagaki (高垣 麗子; born 1979), Japanese model and actress
- Reiko Takagi (高木 礼子; born 1973), Japanese voice actress and narrator
- Reiko Takashima (高島 礼子; born 1964), Japanese actress
- Reiko Takeda (武田 麗子; born 1984), Japanese Olympic show jumping rider
- Reiko Takizawa (滝澤 玲子; born 1962), Japanese former volleyball player
- Reiko Terashima (寺島 令子; born 1958), Japanese yonkoma manga artist and illustrator
- Reiko Tomii (富井 玲子), Japanese-born art historian and curator based in New York
- Reiko Tosa (土佐 礼子; born 1976), Japanese long-distance runner
- Reiko Tokita (土岐田 麗子; born 1984), Japanese fashion model and tarento
- Reiko Yamashita (born 1973), a J-pop singer, member of the group Oororagoninmusume
- Reiko Yasuhara (安原 麗子; born 1969), Japanese actress, voice actress and singer
- Reiko Yoshida (吉田 玲子; born 1967), Japanese screenwriter

Reiko is a masculine German given name. Notable people with the name include:

- Reiko Füting (born 1970) German composer

== Fictional characters ==
- Reiko, a male character from the fighting game series Mortal Kombat
- Reiko, a supporting character of the tokusatsu film Kamen Rider ZO
- Reiko Katherine Akimoto, a character in the manga/anime Kochira Katsushika-ku Kameari Kōen-mae Hashutsujo
- Reiko Asakawa, the heroine of the J-Horror film Ring
- Reiko Aya, the human pseudonym of Sailor Aluminium Siren, one of the Sailor Animamates in the Sailor Moon metaseries
- Reiko Fujiwara, a character in the manga/anime Ojamajo Doremi
- Reiko Higuchi, the heroine character of the tokusatsu series Solbrain
- Reiko Hinomoto, a character in Rumble Roses and Rumble Roses XX
- Reiko Ichikawa, from Infinite Ryvius
- Reiko Kisaragi, a supporting character from Go! Princess PreCure
- Reiko Nagase, a virtual race queen from the racing game series Ridge Racer
- Reiko Kurokaki, a fictional character from Marvel Nemesis: Rise of the Imperfects
- Reiko Saeki, a character in the light novel series Asura Cryin'
- Reiko Yuki, a psychic in the animated series Gilgamesh
- Reiko Mikami, a character in the novel and anime Another
- Reiko Mikami, the main character in the manga and anime Ghost Sweeper Mikami
- Reiko Natsume, the late maternal grandmother of the protagonist of the ongoing manga and anime Natsume's Book of Friends
- Reiko, the anti-hero of the animated YouTube video Kimyona Sekai.
- Reiko Yanagi, a character in the Boku No Hero Academia in class 1B.
- Reiko Tamura (disambiguation), multiple characters

== See also ==
- Reiko the Zombie Shop, a Japanese manga series by Rei Mikamoto
- Reiko (novel), a novel by New Zealand author Ian Middleton
- Reikou, a citrus fruit
