= Yasuyuki Kawahigashi =

Japanese mathematician

- 河東泰之
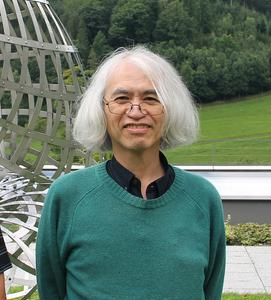
- Kawahigashi at Oberwolfach in 2025
- Born: 1962 (age 63–64); Ōta, Tokyo, Japan
- Education: University of Tokyo; University of California, Los Angeles
- Occupation: Mathematician
- Website: https://www.ms.u-tokyo.ac.jp/~yasuyuki/index-e.html

Yasuyuki Kawahigashi (河東 泰之, born 1962), formerly known as Yasuyuki Asano, is a Japanese mathematician and a professor at the Graduate School of Mathematical Sciences, the University of Tokyo. His primary area of expertise is operator algebra theory.

== Career ==
Born in Ōta, Tokyo, Kawahigashi was raised in a family where his father worked for an oil company and his mother was a teacher at a Kumon learning centre. Kawahigashi graduated from Azabu High School in 1981, where he was classmates with Hiraku Nakajima. He matriculated at the University of Tokyo in 1981. During his years as an undergraduate, he worked for ASCII and authored several bestselling software books, supporting himself through royalties.

Kawahigashi completed his undergraduate degree at UTokyo's Department of Mathematics in 1985. He then went on to study at the University of California, Los Angeles in 1985 under the supervision of Masamichi Takesaki, a proponent of the Tomita–Takesaki theory. he earned his master's degree from UCLA the following year. He earned his first Ph.D. from UCLA in 1989 and the second from UTokyo in 1990. He has held various academic positions at various institutions before attaining his current role.

=== Major Contributions ===
According to Kawahigashi, his most notable achievement so far is the completion of the classification theory for local conformal nets with central charge less than one, co-authored with Italian mathematician Roberto Longo in 2004.

== Supervision ==
Kawahigashi has supervised Narutaka Ozawa as a doctoral candidate. Although educated at the Department of Physics of UTokyo, Yoshiko Ogata joined Kawahigashi's seminar as a student, and she worked with him at the Department of Mathematics at the university for more than a decade.

Kawahigashi believes that one should never stop questioning, researching, or consulting others until complete understanding is achieved, asserting that 'It is absurd for someone who cannot do this to be in a doctoral programme.

== Recognition ==
He was elected to the 2026 class of Fellows of the American Mathematical Society.
