= Tomoyuki =

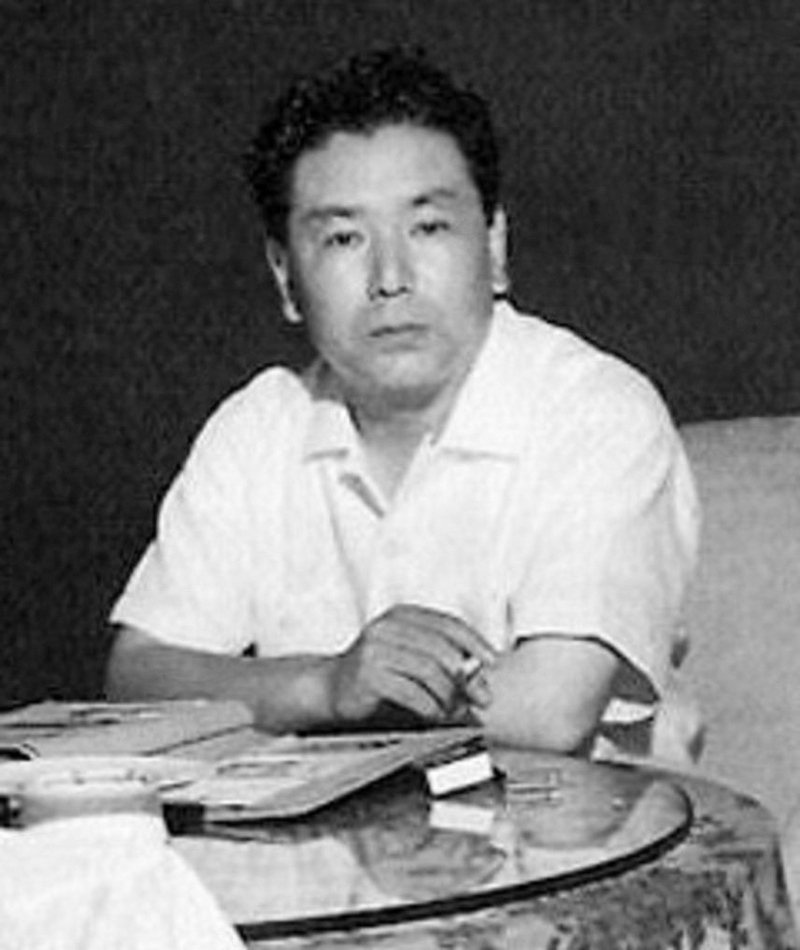
- Tomoyuki Tanaka (1910–1997), Japanese film producer
- Pronunciation: tomojɯkʲi (IPA)
- Gender: Male

Origin
- Origin: Japanese
- Meaning: Different meanings depending on the kanji used

Tomoyuki is a masculine Japanese given name.

== Written forms ==
Tomoyuki can be written using many different combinations of kanji characters. Some examples:

- 友之, "friend, of"
- 友幸, "friend, happiness"
- 友行, "friend, go"
- 友恭, "friend, respectful"
- 友志, "friend, determination"
- 知之, "know, of"
- 知幸, "know, happiness"
- 知行, "know, go"
- 知恭, "know, respectful"
- 知志, "know, determination"
- 智之, "intellect, of"
- 智幸, "intellect, happiness"
- 智行, "intellect, go"
- 共行, "together, go"
- 朋幸, "companion, happiness"
- 朝之, "morning/dynasty, of"
- 朝幸, "morning/dynasty, happiness"
- 朝行, "morning/dynasty, go"

The name can also be written in hiragana ともゆき or katakana トモユキ.

== Notable people with the name ==
- Tomoyuki Arakawa (荒川 知幸; born 1968), Japanese mathematician
- Tomoyuki Arata (荒田 智之; born 1985), Japanese footballer
- Tomoyuki Dan (檀 臣幸; 1963–2013), Japanese actor and voice actor
- Tomoyuki Furumaya (古厩 智之; born 1968), Japanese film director
- Tomoyuki Hirase (平瀬 智行; born 1977), Japanese footballer
- Tomoyuki Hoshino (星野 智幸; born 1965), Japanese writer
- Tomoyuki Kajino (梶野 智幸; born 1960), Japanese footballer
- Tomoyuki Kawabata (河端 朋之; born 1985), Japanese cyclist
- Tomoyuki Kōno (河野 智之; born 1971), Japanese voice actor
- Tomoyuki Kubota (久保田 智之; born 1981), Japanese baseball player
- Tomoyuki Matsuda (松田 知幸; born 1975), Japanese sport shooter
- Tomoyuki Nishita (西田 友是; born 1949), Japanese computer scientist
- Tomoyuki Sakai (酒井 友之; born 1979), Japanese footballer
- Tomoyuki Sasaki (佐々木 共之; born 1963), Japanese sailor
- Tomoyuki Sato (佐藤 智之; born 1981), Japanese long-distance runner
- Tomoyuki Sugano (菅野 智之; born 1989), Japanese baseball player
- Tomoyuki Suzuki (鈴木 智幸; born 1985), Japanese footballer
- Tomoyuki Tanaka (田中 友幸; 1910–1997), Japanese film producer
- Tomoyuki Yamashita (山下 奉文; 1885–1946), Japanese Imperial Army general
- Tomoyuki Yoshino (吉野 智行; born 1980), Japanese footballer
