= Peter Orlik =

American mathematician (born 1938)

Peter Paul Nikolas Orlik (born 12 November 1938, in Budapest) is an American mathematician, known for his research on topology, algebra, and combinatorics.

Orlik earned in 1961 his bachelor's degree from the Norwegian Institute of Technology in Trondheim and in 1966 his Ph.D. from the University of Michigan under Frank Raymond with thesis Necessary conditions for the homeomorphism of Seifert manifolds. He became in 1966 an assistant professor and in 1973 a full professor at the University of Wisconsin–Madison.

Orlik was in the academic year 1971/72 a visiting professor in Oslo. From 1967 to 1969 he was a visiting scholar at the Institute for Advanced Study.

Orlik is the author of over 70 publications. He works on Seifert manifolds, singularity theory, braid theory, reflection groups, invariant theory, and hypergeometric integrals. He was, with Louis Solomon and Hiroaki Terao, a pioneer of the theory of arrangements of hyperplanes in complex space.

In 2012 he was elected a Fellow of the American Mathematical Society.

== Selected publications ==
=== Books ===
- Seifert Manifolds, Lecture Notes in Mathematics 291, Springer Verlag, 1972
- as editor: Singularities, 2 vols., American Mathematical Society, 1983
- Introduction to Arrangements, CBMS Regional Conference Series, American Mathematical Society, 1989
- Orlik, Peter; Terao, Hiroaki (1992). Arrangements of Hyperplanes. Grundlehren der mathematischen Wissenschaften. Berlin, Heidelberg: Springer. doi:10.1007/978-3-662-02772-1. ISBN 978-3-642-08137-8. ISSN 0072-7830. MR 1217488.
- Orlik, Peter; Terao, Hiroaki (2007) [2001]. Arrangements and hypergeometric integrals. MSJ Memoirs. Vol. 9 (2nd ed.). Tokyo: Mathematical Society of Japan. ISBN 978-4-931469-10-5. MR 2325213.
- with Volkmar Welker: Algebraic Combinatorics. Lectures at a Summer School in Nordfjordeid, Norway, June 2003, Universitext, Springer Verlag, 2007

=== Articles ===
- with Colin P. Rourke: "Free involutions on homotopy (4k + 3)-spheres". Bulletin of the American Mathematical Society. 74: 949–953. 1968. doi:10.1090/s0002-9904-1968-12101-9. MR 0229245.
- with John Milnor: Milnor, John; Orlik, Peter (1970). "Isolated singularities defined by weighted homogeneous polynomials". Topology. 9 (4): 385–393. doi:10.1016/0040-9383(70)90061-3.
- with Frank Raymond: Orlik, Peter; Raymond, Frank (1970). "Actions of the torus on 4-manifolds. I". Transactions of the American Mathematical Society. 152 (2): 531–559. doi:10.1090/s0002-9947-1970-0268911-3. MR 0268911.
- with Philip Wagreich: Orlik, Peter; Wagreich, Philip (1971). "Isolated singularities of algebraic surfaces with C*-action". Annals of Mathematics. 93 (2): 205–228. doi:10.2307/1970772. JSTOR 1970772.
- The multiplicity of a holomorphic map at an isolated critical point, in Real and complex singularities, Oslo: Sijthoff and Noordhoff, 1977, 405–474
- Orlik, Peter (1979). "Singularities and group actions". Bulletin of the American Mathematical Society. 1 (5): 703–720. doi:10.1090/s0273-0979-1979-14643-3. MR 0537624.
- with Louis Solomon: Orlik, Peter; Solomon, Louis (1980). "Combinatorics and topology of complements of hyperplanes". Inventiones Mathematicae. 56 (2): 167–189. Bibcode:1980InMat..56..167O. doi:10.1007/bf01392549. S2CID 123685579.
- with Daniel C. Cohen: Cohen, Daniel C.; Orlik, Peter (2005). "Gauss–Manin connections for arrangements, III Formal connections". Transactions of the American Mathematical Society. 357 (8): 3031–3050. arXiv:math/0105063. doi:10.1090/s0002-9947-04-03621-9. MR 2135734. S2CID 2173664.
