= Bang-Yen Chen =

Taiwanese American mathematician (born 1943)

Chen Bang-yen
- 陳邦彦
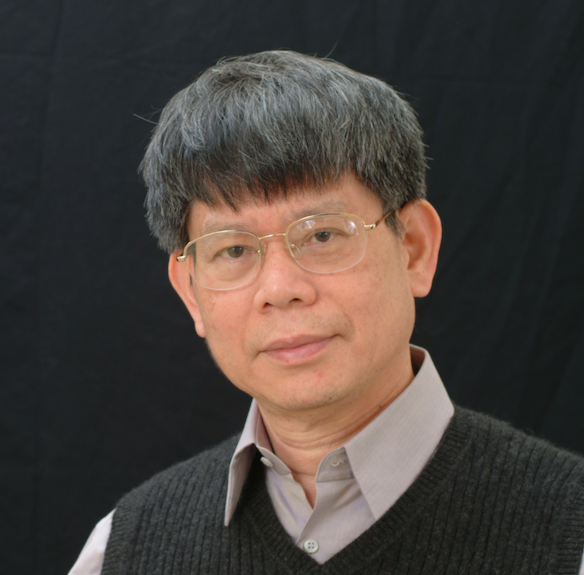
- Born: October 3, 1943 (age 82); Toucheng, Yilan, Taiwan
- Education: Tamkang University (BS); National Tsing Hua University (MS); University of Notre Dame (PhD)
- Known for: "Chen inequalities", "Chen invariants (or δ-invariants)", "Chen's conjectures", "Chen surface", "Chen–Ricci inequality", "Chen submanifold", "Chen equality", "Chen flow", "Submanifolds of finite type", "Slant submanifolds", "ideal immersion", "(M+,M-)-theory (or Chen-Nagano theory) for compact symmetric spaces (joint with Tadashi Nagano)", "maximal antipodal sets and 2-numbers of Riemannian manifolds (also joint with Tadashi Nagano)".
- Scientific career
- Fields: Differential geometry, Riemannian geometry, Symmetric spaces, Topology
- Workplaces: Michigan State University
- Thesis: On the G-total curvature and topology of immersed manifolds (1970)
- Doctoral advisor: Tadashi Nagano
- Doctoral students: Bogdan Suceavă
- Website: www.researchgate.net/profile/Bang_Yen_Chen

Chen Bang-yen (traditional Chinese: 陳邦彦; born October 3, 1943) is a Taiwanese-American mathematician who works mainly on differential geometry and related subjects. He was a University Distinguished Professor of Michigan State University from 1990 to 2012 until his retirement. After 2012, he became University Distinguished Professor Emeritus.

== Early life and education ==
Chen was born in Toucheng, Taiwan. He received his B.S. from Tamkang University in 1965 and his M.S. from National Tsing Hua University in 1967. He obtained his Ph.D. degree from the University of Notre Dame in 1970 under the supervision of Tadashi Nagano.

== Career ==
Chen Bang-yen taught at Tamkang University between 1965 and 1968 and at National Tsing Hua University during the academic year 1967–1968. After completing his doctoral studies (1968-1970) at the University of Notre Dame, he joined the faculty at Michigan State University as a research associate from 1970 to 1972. He became an associate professor in 1972 and a full professor in 1976. He was awarded the title of University Distinguished Professor in 1990. After 2012, he became University Distinguished Professor Emeritus.

Chen Bang-yen is the author of over 600 works, including 12 books, spanning more than six decades. His works have been cited over 40,000 times. He also co-edited five books, four of which were published by Springer and one of which by the American Mathematical Society.

In 1989, Chen Bang-yen became an elected corresponding member of Accademia Peloritana dei Pericolanti, Italy. In 2008, Chen was presented with the first Geometry Prize from the Simon Stevin Institute for Geometry, Netherlands, for his seminal contributions to differential geometry. He was named as one of the top 15 famous Taiwanese scientists by the SCI Journal in 2022. Chen Bang-yen was awarded doctorates from the Science University of Tokyo (D.Sc. 1981) and Ovidius University of Constanța (Dr.h.c. 2025). On October 20–21, 2018, at the 1143rd Meeting of the American Mathematical Society held at Ann Arbor, Michigan, one of the Special Sessions was dedicated to Chen's 75th birthday. The volume 756 in the Contemporary Mathematics series, published by the American Mathematical Society, is dedicated to Chen Bang-yen, and it includes many contributions presented in the Ann Arbor event. The volume is edited by Joeri Van der Veken, Alfonso Carriazo, Ivko Dimitrić, Yun Myung Oh, Bogdan Suceavă, and Luc Vrancken. On July 15–16, 2024, the 9th European Congress of Mathematics held at Seville, Spain, includes in its program a mini symposium on Geometry of Submanifolds, celebrating Chen Bang-yen's 80th Anniversary.

== Research contributions ==
In symmetric spaces, Chen Bang-yen and Tadashi Nagano created the (M+,M-)-theory (also known as the Chen-Nagano theory) for compact symmetric spaces with important applications to several areas in mathematics. One of the advantages of their theory is that it is powerful for applying inductive arguments on polars or meridians. In particularly, Chen and Nagano initiated the study of maximal antipodal set and 2-number (also known as Chen-Nagano invariant); as an application Chen and Nagano were able to completely determine 2-rank of all compact simple Lie groups and thus they settled a problem in group theory raised by prominent mathematicians Armand Borel and Jean-Pierre Serre.

In 1993, Chen Bang-yen studied submanifolds of space forms, showing that the intrinsic sectional curvature at any point is bounded below in terms of the intrinsic scalar curvature, the length of the mean curvature vector, and the curvature of the space form. Consequently, given a minimal submanifold of Euclidean space, every sectional curvature at a point is greater than or equal to one-half of the scalar curvature at that point. Interestingly, the submanifolds for which the inequality is an equality can be characterized as certain products of minimal surfaces of low dimension with Euclidean spaces.

In Riemannian geometry, Chen Bang-yen invented the theory of δ-invariants (also known as Chen invariants), which are certain kinds of partial traces of the sectional curvature; they can be viewed as an interpolation between sectional curvature and scalar curvature, allowing for more nuanced analysis of submanifolds. Due to the Gauss equation, the δ-invariants of a Riemannian submanifold can be controlled by the length of the mean curvature vector and the size of the sectional curvature of the ambient manifold. Submanifolds of space forms that satisfy the equality case of this inequality are known as ideal immersions; such submanifolds are critical points of a certain restriction of the Willmore energy. Also in Riemannian geometry, Chen Bang-yen and Kentaro Yano initiated the study of spaces of quasi-constant curvature.

In differential geometry, Chen Bang-yen also created the theory of finite type submanifolds, which studies submanifolds of a Euclidean space for which the position vector is a finite linear combination of eigenfunctions of the Laplace-Beltrami operator. As a by-product, Chen proposed his longstanding biharmonic conjecture in 1991, stating that any biharmonic submanifold in a Euclidean space must be a minimal submanifold.

In complex geometry, Chen Bang-yen created the theory of slant submanifolds. A slant submanifold of an almost Hermitian manifold is a submanifold for which there is a number θ such that the image under the almost complex structure of an arbitrary submanifold tangent vector has an angle of θ with the submanifold's tangent space. Within the context of almost Hermitian manifolds, Chen also initiated the theory of the geometry of warped product submanifolds by establishing sharp relationships between the warping function and mean curvature of warped product submanifolds. In particular, he introduced the study of CR-warped product submanifolds, providing a new method to investigate CR-submanifolds and their extensions by utilizing the concept of warped product.

In general relativity and gravitational theory, Chen Bang-yen established a simple and useful characterization of generalized Robertson-Walker spacetimes; namely, a Lorentzian manifold is a generalized Robertson-Walker spacetime if and only if it admits a timelike concircular vector field.

Given an almost Hermitian manifold, a totally real submanifold is one for which the tangent space is orthogonal to its image under the almost complex structure. From the algebraic structure of the Gauss equation and the Simons formula, Chen Bang-yen and Koichi Ogiue derived several information on submanifolds of complex space forms which are totally real and minimal. By using Shiing-Shen Chern, Manfredo do Carmo, and Shoshichi Kobayashi's estimate of the algebraic terms in the Simons formula, Chen and Ogiue showed that closed submanifolds which are totally real and minimal must be totally geodesic if the second fundamental form is sufficiently small. By using the Codazzi equation and isothermal coordinates, they also obtained rigidity results on two-dimensional closed submanifolds of complex space forms, which are totally real.

== Selected publications ==
Major articles

- Chen Bang-yen and Koichi Ogiue. On totally real submanifolds. Trans. Amer. Math. Soc. 193 (1974), 257–266. doi:10.1090/S0002-9947-1974-0346708-7
- Chen Bang-yen. Some pinching and classification theorems for minimal submanifolds. Arch. Math. (Basel) 60 (1993), no. 6, 568–578. doi:10.1007/BF01236084

Surveys

- Chen Bang-yen. Some open problems and conjectures on submanifolds of finite type. Soochow J. Math. 17 (1991), no. 2, 169–188.
- Chen Bang-yen. A report on submanifolds of finite type. Soochow J. Math. 22 (1996), no. 2, 117–337.
- Chen Bang-yen. Riemannian submanifolds. Handbook of Differential Geometry, Vol. I (2000), 187–418. North-Holland, Amsterdam. doi:10.1016/S1874-5741(00)80006-0; arXiv:1307.1875

Books

- Chen Bang-yen. Geometry of submanifolds. Pure and Applied Mathematics, No. 22. Marcel Dekker, Inc., New York, 1973. vii+298 pp. ISBN 0-8247-6075-1
- Chen Bang-yen. Geometry of submanifolds and its applications. Science University of Tokyo, Tokyo, 1981. iii+96 pp.
- Chen Bang-yen. Finite type submanifolds and generalizations. Università degli Studi di Roma "La Sapienza", Istituto Matematico "Guido Castelnuovo", Rome, 1985. iv+68 pp.
- Chen Bang-yen. A new approach to compact symmetric spaces and applications. A report on joint work with Professor T. Nagano. Katholieke Universiteit Leuven, Louvain, 1987. 83 pp.
- Chen Bang-yen. Geometry of slant submanifolds. Katholieke Universiteit Leuven, Louvain, 1990. 123 pp. arXiv:1307.1512
- Chen Bang-yen and Leopold Verstraelen. Laplace transformations of submanifolds. Centre for Pure and Applied Differential Geometry (PADGE), 1. Katholieke Universiteit Brussel, Group of Exact Sciences, Brussels; Katholieke Universiteit Leuven, Department of Mathematics, Leuven, 1995. x+126 pp.
- Chen Bang-yen. Pseudo-Riemannian geometry, δ-invariants and applications. With a foreword by Leopold Verstraelen. World Scientific Publishing Co. Pte. Ltd., Hackensack, NJ, 2011. xxxii+477 pp. ISBN 978-981-4329-63-7, 981-4329-63-0. doi:10.1142/8003
- Chen Bang-yen. Total mean curvature and submanifolds of finite type. Second edition of the 1984 original. With a foreword by Leopold Verstraelen. Series in Pure Mathematics, 27. World Scientific Publishing Co. Pte. Ltd., Hackensack, NJ, 2015. xviii+467 pp. ISBN 978-981-4616-69-0, 978-981-4616-68-3. doi:10.1142/9237
- Chen Bang-yen. Differential geometry of warped product manifolds and submanifolds. With a foreword by Leopold Verstraelen. World Scientific Publishing Co. Pte. Ltd., Hackensack, NJ, 2017. xxx+486 pp. ISBN 978-981-3208-92-6, doi:10.1142/10419
- Chen Bang-yen. Geometry of submanifolds. Dover Publications, Inc., Mineola, New York, 1973. viii+184 pp. ISBN 978-0-486-83278-4
- Ye-Lin Ou and Chen Bang-yen. Biharmonic submanifolds and biharmonic maps in Riemannian geometry. World Scientific Publishing Co. Pte. Ltd., Hackensack, NJ, 2020. xii+528 pp. ISBN 978-981-121-237-6, doi:10.1142/11610
- Chen Bang-yen, Mohammad Hasan Shahid, and Gabriel-Eduard Vîlcu, Geometry of CR-submanifolds and Applications. With a foreword by Sorin Dragomir. Springer, Singapore, 2025, xviii+597 pp. ISBN 978-981-96-2817-9, doi:10.1007/978-981-96-2818-6
