= Hitoshi Ishii =

Japanese mathematician

Hitoshi Ishii (石井 仁司 Ishii Hitoshi, born on 12 October 1947), a Japanese mathematician, who is specialized in partial differential equations.

He first studied physics and then mathematics at Waseda University with a master's degree in 1972 and a doctorate in 1975 with dissertation "偏微分方程式の初期値問題のLP可解性及び一意性" (translation: "L_{p} solvability and uniqueness of the initial value problem for partial differential equations"). He became an assistant professor at Chūō University in 1976 and in 1989 a full professor. In 1996, he became a professor at Tokyo Metropolitan University and in 2001, he became a professor at Waseda University. He studies nonlinear partial differential equations (PDEs) such as Hamilton–Jacobi equation, viscosity solutions of PDEs, optimal control theory, differential games, and evolution of surfaces.

From 1987 to 1988, he was a visiting professor at Brown University, in 2011 at Collège de France, and in 2010 at University of Chicago. From 2011 to 2014 he was an adjunct professor at King Abdulaziz University.

In 1994, He received the Autumn Prize from the Mathematical Society of Japan. In 2002, he was named to the Thomson ISI list of highly cited researchers in mathematics. He was an invited speaker with talk Asymptotic solutions for large time of Hamilton-Jacobi equations at the International Congress of Mathematicians in 2006 in Madrid. He was an invited speaker at the 7th International Congress on Industrial and Applied Mathematics (ICIAM) 2007 in Zurich. In 2012 he was elected a Fellow of the American Mathematical Society.

== Selected publications ==
- with Michael G. Crandall and Pierre-Louis Lions: User’s guide to viscosity solutions of second order partial differential equations. Bulletin AMS, vol. 27, 1992, 1–67 doi:10.1090/S0273-0979-1992-00266-5
- mit Pierre-Louis Lions: Viscosity solutions of fully nonlinear second-order elliptic partial differential equations. Journal of Differential Equations, vol. 83, 1990, 26–78 doi:10.1016/0022-0396(90)90068-2
- On uniqueness and existence of viscosity solutions of fully nonlinear second order elliptic PDE's. Communications on Pure and Applied Mathematics, vol. 42, 1989, 15–45 doi:10.1002/cpa.3160420103
- Perron’s method for Hamilton-Jacobi equations. Duke Math. J., vol. 55, 1987, 369–384 doi:10.1215/S0012-7094-87-05521-9
