= Rieko =

- Gender: Female

Origin
- Origin: Japanese
- Meaning: different meanings depending on the kanji used

Other names
- Related names: Rie; Reiko; Rei

Rieko (りえこ, リエコ) is a feminine Japanese given name.

== Written forms ==
Rieko can be written using different kanji characters and can mean:

- 理恵子, "logic, blessing, child"
- 梨枝子, "pear, branch, child"
- 利恵子, "profit, blessing, child"
- 里江子, "hometown, creek, child"
- 理絵子, "logic, picture, child"
- 理枝子, "logic, branch, child"

The name can also be written in hiragana or katakana.

== People ==
- Rieko Amano (天野 理恵子; born 1976), Japanese retired professional wrestler under the ring name Carlos Amano
- Rieko Ioane, a New Zealand rugby union player
- Rieko Ito (利恵子), a member of the J-pop band Round Table
- Rieko Kodama (理恵子), a Japanese video game designer
- Rieko Matsunaga (松永 里絵子; born 1979), Japanese rhythmic gymnast
- Rieko Matsuura (松浦 理英子; born 1958), Japanese novelist and short story writer
- Rieko Miura (理恵子), a J-pop singer and actress
- Rieko Miyoshi (天野 理恵子; born 1976), Japanese singer/songwriter and pianist under the stage name Kotringo
- Rieko Nakagawa (中川李枝子), a Japanese children's book writer and lyricist
- Rieko Saibara (西原 理恵子; born 1964), Japanese manga artist
- Rieko Takahashi (高橋 理恵子; born 1967), Japanese actress and voice actress
- Rieko Yauchi (矢内 理絵子; born 1980), Japanese women's professional shogi player

== Fictional characters ==
- Rieko, an android in the manga, tokusatsu, and anime series Kikaider
