= Reiko Sakamoto =

Reiko Sakamoto may refer to:

- Reiko Sakamoto (table tennis)
- Reiko Sakamoto (mathematician)
