= Hideki Omori =

Japanese mathematician

- 大森英樹
- Hideki Omori in 2006
- Born: December 3, 1938 (age 87); Nishinomiya, Hyōgo Prefecture, Japan
- Education: University of Tokyo
- Known for: Omori−Yau maximum principle
- Awards: Geometry Prize of the Mathematical Society of Japan (1996)
- Scientific career
- Fields: Differential geometry Lie groups Deformation quantization
- Workplaces: Tokyo Metropolitan University; Okayama University; Tokyo University of Science
- Thesis: A study of transformation groups on manifolds (1967)

Hideki Omori (大森英樹, born December 3, 1938) is a Japanese mathematician who specialized in geometry and worked at Tokyo University of Science.

== Life and career ==
Hideki Omori was born in Nishinomiya, Hyōgo Prefecture, on December 3, 1938. He completed both his undergraduate and graduate studies at the University of Tokyo. In 1966, he was awarded his Ph.D. degree for his dissertation on the study of transformation groups on manifolds. After completing his doctoral studies, Omori began his professional academic career at Tokyo Metropolitan University, where he held his first research position. In 1967, early in his career, he was invited to the Institute for Advanced Study in Princeton, New Jersey. This was followed by a position at the Mathematics Institute at the University of Warwick in 1970, and later at Bonn University in 1972. Together with Akira Yoshioka, he wrote an introductory calculus textbook: 直観世界からの微・積分入門.

During his time at Warwick, he developed a strong interest in the work of K. David Elworthy on stochastic analysis. Omori is credited with being the first person to introduce Elworthy's work on stochastic analysis to the Japanese mathematical community. In 1980, Omori moved to Okayama University, where he continued his research and teaching. Two years later, in 1982, he joined the faculty of Tokyo University of Science as a professor. In 1996, he was awarded the Geometry Prize of the Mathematical Society of Japan. Omori continued his active research well beyond typical retirement age, focusing particularly on problems of deformation quantization beginning in 1999. His retirement from Tokyo University of Science was celebrated in April 2004 with an conference held at the Morito Hall of Tokyo University of Science.

== See also ==
- Omori−Yau maximum principle

== Selected publications ==
- Omori, Hideki (1967). "Isometric immersions of Riemannian manifolds". Journal of the Mathematical Society of Japan. 19 (2): 205–214. doi:10.2969/jmsj/01920205.
- Omori, Hideki; Maeda, Yoshiaki; Yoshioka, Akira (1991). "Weyl manifolds and deformation quantization". Advances in Mathematics. 85 (2): 224–255. doi:10.1016/0001-8708(91)90057-E.
- Omori, Hideki (1973). "Groups of diffeomorphisms and their subgroups". Transactions of the American Mathematical Society. 179: 85–122. doi:10.1090/S0002-9947-1973-0377975-0.
