= Morio Obata =

Japanese mathematician

- 小畠 守生
- Born: June 5, 1926; Busan, Korea, Empire of Japan
- Died: December 21, 2006 (aged 80)
- Education: Kumamoto University (BS); University of Tokyo (MS); Tokyo Metropolitan University (DSc)
- Known for: Lichnerowicz–Obata theorem Ledger–Obata space Obata connection
- Spouse: Fumiko Obata
- Children: 2
- Scientific career
- Fields: Differential geometry Conformal geometry Global analysis Riemannian geometry
- Workplaces: Keio University; Tokyo Metropolitan University; University of Illinois at Urbana-Champaign
- Thesis: Affine connections on manifolds with almost complex, quaternion or Hermitian structure (1957)

Morio Obata (小畠 守生, Obata Morio; June 5, 1926 – December 21, 2006) was a Japanese mathematician who contributed to geometry and analysis.

== Life and career ==
Obata was born on June 5, 1926, in Busan, Korea, Empire of Japan.

Obata obtained a bachelor of science degree from the Fifth College at Kumamoto University in 1947 and subsequently studied under the guidance of Kentaro Yano at the University of Tokyo, who was frequently away working at the Institute for Advanced Study in Princeton, New Jersey and other institutions. A chance meeting with Shizuo Kakutani in 1947 influenced Obata's decision to pursue differential geometry as his field of research, as Kakutani remarked that if he were younger and just starting his mathematical career, he would be studying it. Obata obtained a master of science degree from the University of Tokyo in 1950. In 1951, he joined the Tokyo Metropolitan University and published joint papers with his friend Shigeru Ishihara on affine connections and conformal transformations from 1953 to 1955. In 1956, he established that an irreducible noncompact Kähler manifold admits isometries which are not holomorphic only if the holonomy group is the symplectic group $\text{Sp}(n)$. Obata's dissertation was on affine connections on manifolds with almost complex, almost quaternion, and almost Hermitian structure. He earned his doctorate in 1958.

From 1958 to 1961, he worked as a visiting mathematician and research assistant professor at the University of Illinois at Urbana-Champaign until he joined Tokyo Metropolitan University staff as an associate professor. In 1963, he participated in fundraising efforts for mathematical research and worked with Takeo Fujisawa (then vice-president of Honda Motor Company) to secure funding for the mathematical community through the Sakkokai foundation. Obata was made a full professor of mathematics in 1966. After leaving Tokyo Metropolitan University in 1978, Obata moved to Keio University, where he supervised a number of geometry graduate students. In 1987, Obata established the Geometry Prize of the Mathematical Society of Japan, which is awarded to geometers for achievements, contributions, or guidance to younger researchers. By 1991, the prize had been awarded to ten geometers. He retired from Keio University in 1991 at the age of 65; a workshop celebrating his contributions to geometry and global analysis was held in his honor from November 19 to 21 of the same year.

Obata died on December 21, 2006, at the age of 80. He was a member of the American Mathematical Society for 47 years.

== Selected publications ==
- Obata, Morio. "The conjectures on conformal transformations of Riemannian manifolds." (1971): 265–270.
- Obata, Morio. "Certain conditions for a Riemannian manifold to be isometric with a sphere Dedicated to Professor Kentaro Yano on his fiftieth birthday." Journal of the Mathematical Society of Japan 14.3 (1962): 333–340.
- Obata, Morio. "Affine connections on manifolds with almost complex, quaternion or Hermitian structure." Japanese journal of mathematics: transactions and abstracts. Vol. 26. The Mathematical Society of Japan, 1956.
- Obata, Morio. "Conformal transformations of Riemannian manifolds." Journal of Differential Geometry 4.3 (1970): 311–333.
- Obata, Morio. "The Gauss map of immersions of Riemannian manifolds in spaces of constant curvature." Journal of Differential Geometry 2.2 (1968): 217–223.
