= Miyaoka =

Miyaoka (written: 宮岡) is a Japanese surname. Notable people with the surname include:

- Reiko Miyaoka (宮岡 礼子, born 1951), Japanese mathematician
- Yoichi Miyaoka (宮岡 洋一), Japanese mathematician
