= Mathematical Society of Japan =

Japanese learned society

The Mathematical Society of Japan (MSJ, Japanese: 日本数学会) is a learned society for mathematics in Japan.

In 1877, the organization was established as the Tokyo Sugaku Kaisha and was the first academic society in Japan. It was re-organized and re-established in its present form in 1946.

The MSJ has roughly 5,000 members. They have the opportunity to participate in programs at MSJ meetings which take place in spring and autumn each year. They also have the opportunity to announce their own research at these meetings.

== Prizes ==
=== Iyanaga Prize ===
The Iyanaga Prize was a mathematics award granted by the Mathematical Society of Japan. The prize was funded through an endowment given by Shokichi Iyanaga. Since 1988, it has been replaced by the Spring Prize.

- 1973 - Yasutaka Ihara
- 1974 - Reiko Sakamoto
- 1975 - Motoo Takahashi
- 1976 - Mitsuyoshi Katō
- 1977 - Takahiro Kawai
- 1978 - Takuro Shintani
- 1979 - Goro Nishida
- 1980 - Katsuhiro Shiohama
- 1981 - Masaki Kashiwara
- 1982 - Shigeru Iitaka
- 1983 - Shigefumi Mori
- 1984 - Yukio Matsumoto
- 1985 - Toshio Oshima
- 1986 - Shinichi Kotani
- 1987 - Toshikazu Sunada

=== Geometry Prize ===
The Geometry Prize is a mathematics award granted by the Mathematical Society of Japan to recognise significant or long-time research work in the field of geometry, including differential geometry, topology, and algebraic geometry. It was established in 1987 by Morio Obata.

- 1987 - Akio Kawauchi and Shoshichi Kobayashi
- 1988 - Hirotaka Fujimoto
- 1989 - Kenji Fukaya and Yoshio Muto
- 1990 - Akito Futaki
- 1991 - Masaru Takeuchi and Takashi Tsuboi
- 1992 - Akira Fujiki and Norihito Koiso
- 1993 - Tomoyoshi Yoshida
- 1994 - Ryoichi Kobayashi and Tadashi Nagano
- 1995 - Masaaki Umehara and Kotaro Yamada
- 1996 - Hideki Omori
- 1997 - Shigetoshi Bando and Hiraku Nakajima
- 1998 - Masahiko Kanai and Tomotada Ohtsuki
- 1999 - Kaoru Ono and Takao Yamaguchi
- 2000 - Sadayoshi Kojima and Takeo Ohsawa
- 2001 - Reiko Miyaoka
- 2002 - Kazuyoshi Kiyohara and Hajime Tsuji
- 2003 - Kengo Hirachi and Shigenori Matsumoto
- 2004 - Seiichi Kamada and Shin Nayatani
- 2005 - Koji Fujiwara and Ryushi Goto
- 2006 - Toshiki Mabuchi and Takashi Shioya
- 2007 - Shigeyuki Morita and Ken-Ichi Yoshikawa
- 2008 - Kazuo Habiro
- 2009 - Ko Honda and Yoshikata Kida
- 2010 - Kazuo Akutagawa and Nobuhiro Honda
- 2011 - Shin-ichi Ohta and Kyoji Saito
- 2012 - Ken'ichi Ohshika and Yukinobu Toda
- 2013 - Toshitake Kohno and Katsutoshi Yamanoi
- 2014 - Masatake Kuranishi
- 2015 - Hiroshi Iritani and Osamu Saeki
- 2016 - Teruhiko Soma and Shigeharu Takayama
- 2017 - Osamu Kobayashi and Makoto Sakuma
- 2018 Yuji Odaka and Shouhei Honda
- 2019 Kei Irie and Masaki Tsukamoto
- 2020 Mikiya Masuda
- 2021 Nariya Kawazumi and Yusuke Kuno;
  and Jun Murakami
- 2022 Hiroshi Iriyeh and Masataka Shibata;
  and Tatsuki Kuwagaki

=== Takebe Prize ===
In the context of its 50th anniversary celebrations, the Mathematical Society of Japan established the Takebe Prize for the encouragement of those who show promise as mathematicians. The award is named after Edo period mathematician Takebe Katahiro (建部賢弘; 1664-1739) (also known as Takebe Kenkō).

=== Spring Prize ===
- 1988 Kazuya Kato
- 1989 Yoichi Miayoka
- 1990 Hiroshi Matano
- 1991 Morihiko Saito
- 1992 Haruzo Hida
- 1993 Shigeo Kusuoka
- 1994 Kenji Fukaya
- 1995 Mitsuhiro Shishikura
- 1996 Shūji Saitō
- 1997 Hitoshi Arai
- 1998 Toru Ozawa
- 1999 Toshiyuki Kobayashi
- 2000 Hiraku Nakajima
- 2001 Takeshi Saito
- 2002 Yasuyuki Kawahigashi
- 2003 Tomotada Ohtsuki
- 2004 Takashi Kumagai
- 2005 Takeshi Tsuji
- 2006 Takurō Mochizuki
- 2007 Kenji Nakanishi
- 2008 Hideo Takaoka
- 2009 Narutaka Ozawa
- 2010 Osamu Iyama
- 2011 Atsushi Shiho
- 2012 Shin-ichi Ohta
- 2013 Masayuki Asaoka
- 2014 Yukinobu Toda
- 2015 Kenichi Kawarabayashi
- 2016 Hiroshi Iritani
- 2017 Tomoyuki Abe
- 2018 Yoshikata Kida
- 2019 Yasunori Maekawa
- 2020 Yuji Odaka
- 2021 Masaki Tsukamoto
- 2022 Neal Bez

=== Autumn Prize ===
- 1987 Tetsuji Miwa, Michio Jimbo
- 1988 Yujiro Kawamata, Shigefumi Mori
- 1989 Shinzō Watanabe
- 1990 Tesuji Shioda
- 1991 Akihiro Tsuchiya
- 1992 Shoichiro Sakai
- 1993 Hitoshi Ishii
- 1994 Kunio Murasugi
- 1995 Hitoshi Ishii
- 1996 Shigeru Mukai
- 1997 Kahuhiko Aomoto
- 1998 Hiroaki Nakamura, Akio Tamagawa, Shinichi Mochizuki
- 1999 Mikio Furuta
- 2000 Yoshikazu Giga
- 2001 Gen Nakamura
- 2002 Yasumasa Nishiura
- 2003 Susumu Ariki
- 2004 Toshiyasu Arai
- 2005 Kaoru Ono
- 2006 Hiroshi Isozaki
- 2007 Tadahisa Funaki
- 2008 Masanao Ozawa
- 2009 Kenji Yajima
- 2010 Masaki Izumi
- 2011 Akito Futaki
- 2012 Mitsuhiro Nakao
- 2013 Masato Tsujii
- 2014 Hideo Kozono
- 2015 Koji Fujiwara
- 2016 Shigeyuki Morita
- 2017 Tomoyuki Arakawa
- 2018 Hirofumi Osada
- 2019 Takayoshi Ogawa
- 2020 Masaaki Umehara, Kotarō Yamada
- 2021 Martin Guest
- 2022 Yoshiko Ogata

== English Publications from MSJ ==
MSJ publishes the following journals in English.

- Journal of the Mathematical Society of Japan (JMSJ)
- Japanese Journal of Mathematics (JJM)
- Publications of the Mathematical Society of Japan
- Advanced Studies in Pure Mathematics
- MSJ Memoirs

== See also ==
- Japan Society for Industrial and Applied Mathematics
- List of mathematical societies
