= Yukio Matsumoto =

Japanese mathematician

Yukio Matsumoto (松本 幸夫, Matsumoto Yukio; born 1944) is a Japanese mathematician, who worked mostly in the field of geometric topology and low-dimensional topology. He was a former professor for mathematics at the University of Tokyo.

He received his Ph.D. in 1973 from the university of Tokyo and his supervisor was Ichiro Tamura.

In 1984, he won the Iyanaga Prize of the Mathematical Society of Japan.

== Selected publications ==
=== Books ===
==== Solo ====
- Matsumoto, Yukio (2001). An Introduction to Morse Theory. Translations of Mathematical Monographs. ISBN 978-0821810224.

==== Joint ====
- Kojima, Sadayoshi; Matsumoto, Yukio; Saito, Kyōji; Seppälä, Mika (1995). Topology and Teichmüller spaces. World Scientific Publishing. doi:10.1142/3122.
