= Institute of Modern Languages (Queensland) =

Australian language and translation institute

The Institute of Modern Languages, also known as IML-UQ, is a language and translation institute located within the St Lucia campus of the University of Queensland (UQ) in Brisbane, Australia. Today IML-UQ enrolls 3000 plus students annually in all of its language programs.

IML-UQ provides courses in over 30 languages. Designed to enrich the knowledge of a language and its culture, these courses are taught by native speakers with a focus on enhancing fluency and accuracy of expression. Apart from Latin, their content is based on themes and topics of the modern world in which we live.

IML-UQ is an Australian translator and interpreter service for 75 different languages, specialising in English language translations. Languages available at the IML-UQ include Arabic, Brazilian Portuguese, Cantonese, Chinese Mandarin, Croatian, Czech, Dutch, Danish, Finnish, French, Greek, German, Hebrew, Hindi, Indonesian, Italian, Japanese, Korean, Latin, Norwegian, Persian, Polish, Russian, Spanish, Swedish, Thai, Turkish and Vietnamese amongst many others.

Established in 1934, IML-UQ continues to serve the community by facilitating language learning and cross-cultural communication. Over the years it has sought to develop strategies to reach out to students in order to enrich their experience of learning another language. IML-UQ still meets the language service needs of the corporate sector, small businesses, government departments and community organisations. IML-UQ seeks to fulfill the original aspiration of the University of Queensland Senate to give more adults the chance to deepen their lives by bringing them into the university community via language courses open to the public. IML-UQ also provides a vehicle for UQ students to remain connected with its alumni in a meaningful way over the decades in which they are no longer engaged in more formal study.

== Background ==
When the seventh Senate of the University of Queensland met in March 1932, it stated its intentions "…to serve increasingly, despite straitened resources, not only education but whatever public needs science and learning could serve."

One of the ways these intentions were made manifest in 1934 was "to bring those classes under an Institute of Modern Languages (IML-UQ) associated with the Faculties of Arts and Commerce and to offer through it instruction in any modern language for which there should be a sufficient demand."

The successful launching of the IML-UQ was largely the result of the personal commitment to non-traditional university studies of a number of prominent University of Queensland academics. These academics recognised the demand for language teaching from the community at large.

== Foundation ==
When IML-UQ was established at the University of Queensland on 11 May 1934, it was the first adult education extension unit in modern languages to be attached to an Australian tertiary education institution. According to a university statute, IML-UQ was intended to "promote and extend the teaching of Modern Languages."

The Telegraph reported the University’s decision to establish IML-UQ as follows (12 May 1934): "At the meeting of the University Senate yesterday afternoon a recommendation for the establishment of IML-UQ was approved. This is clearly an important educational development, since it provides machinery for the study of foreign languages that have a cultural and commercial value for the State, and for which no provision is made in secondary schools for Junior, Senior, and Matriculation purposes."

IML-UQ commenced operations with one class each in French and Italian and two in German. In an article entitled ‘A Wider National Perspective’ (Courier-Mail, 14 May 1934, see page 5), the author articulates a vision of language education serving the national interest. The view was that IML-UQ courses would provide training in practical skills which would benefit business and international travel. Language programs were also endorsed as suitable educational ventures towards better international understanding and tolerance.

Australia’s changing perceptions of the non-English speaking world were reflected through the changing patterns of IML-UQ enrolments. New prospects in international commerce and tourism and the evolution of a cosmopolitan Australian society through post-war immigration were reflected in the diversification of language courses. These new courses were offered in response to public demand.

In another article, entitled ‘Foreign Languages’, which appeared in the Courier-Mail on the same day, the new IML-UQ courses were defined as follows: "The courses were…for commercial purposes, and would not enter so deeply into the literature of the languages as in an ordinary degree course, but rather would aim at the impartation of good working business knowledge of each tongue dealt with."

== Teaching methods ==
The history of language teaching at IML-UQ has been characterised by an ongoing search for more effective ways of teaching languages. The Grammar Translation Method was the main language teaching method in the initial decades. After this the Direct Method, which emphasises listening and speaking skills, was introduced.

Today, languages are primarily taught using the Communicative and Intercultural Language Teaching and Learning approaches with less emphasis on whole class activities and more on pair and group work.

== History ==
=== The early years: 1935–1965 ===
On 23 April 1934, resolutions to create a constitution and rules were passed by IML-UQ Joint Sub-Committee of the Faculties of Arts and Commerce. By 1937, special courses were added for those involved in scientific work. In 1952, students of Russian reflected a sentiment that, "Russian will probably be useful in the future".

By 1954, IML-UQ had grown to the point that a review of its purposes, services and administrative structures was required. The main priority was to establish IML-UQ as a provider of ‘adult education’, where courses would not enter ‘deeply into literature’ but focus on a ‘good working knowledge’ for practical application; followed by the expectation to satisfy requirements set for honours students in the Faculty of Commerce; and lastly to provide access to languages for which there was no provision in schools for Junior, Senior and Matriculation purposes.

All IML-UQ classes were held in the Old Government House on George Street. By the late 1960s, all IML-UQ classes were transferred to the St Lucia campus, where they remain today. The first full-time IML-UQ director was appointed in 1965.

=== The middle years: 1965–1998 ===
Donald Munro was the first full-time Director of IML-UQ from 1965 - 1970.

Mr Munro advocated the idea that learning languages would assist in community engagement. He believed that the study of a language would help students to understand the perspective of those who spoke that language. In his own words, his assumption was that "language and culture cannot be separated." He advocated that the study of language could itself form a cultural bridge, and thus is important for Australia’s migrant population.

He began a move to audio-lingual teaching methods by acquiring new teaching and learning equipment which could simultaneously play and record, so that students could compare their pronunciation with a master track.

Dr Max Brändle the second full-time IML-UQ director from 1970 - 1998, taught 5 languages at IML-UQ. During Dr Brändle’s time as IML-UQ director, IML-UQ established the first commercial ELICOS (English Language Intensive Courses for Overseas Students) centre in Australia that taught English solely to individual, full-fee paying students. In 1988 the University set up a separate TESOL unit, now known as the Institute of Continuing & TESOL Education.

=== The later years (1999–) ===
Georgiana Poulter became the new IML-UQ Director in 1999, commencing a series of functional changes to the structure of Institute. In response to the increasing trend of global business, IML-UQ now includes a translation and interpreting service appropriate to the international market inclusive of local cultural needs. External clients range from the mining and engineering industry, to law firms, government departments, migration agents, and the IT, travel and advertising industries.

To enhance the effectiveness of teaching and learning which is the primary focus of IML-UQ, in-house training, or Professional Development (PD), workshops are now implemented for tutors and staff, and involvement with professional associations is encouraged. Translation, interpreting, language courses and customised tuition are the foundational components to support the purpose of IML-UQ in its ongoing role facilitating community engagement and links between UQ and the Brisbane community.

== Language programs ==
=== Adult programs ===
IML-UQ is designed to enhance employment opportunities, improve communication abilities, support lifelong learning and international travel, and maintain language skills in a practical adult (16+) learning environment. Year courses commence March of each year, and second semester courses commence in July. Short courses are offered in Spring, Summer, Autumn and Winter.

Languages currently taught at IML-UQ are: Arabic, Brazilian Portuguese, Chinese (Cantonese), Chinese (Mandarin), Croatian, Danish, Dutch, Finnish, French, German, Greek (Modern), Hebrew (Modern), Hindi, Indonesian, Irish Gaelic, Italian, Japanese, Korean, Latin, Norwegian, Persian, Polish, Russian, Spanish, Swahili, Swedish, Thai, Turkish, Vietnamese.

=== Customised courses ===
IML-UQ offers one-on-one and small group private tuition in most languages customised for business, government departments, companies, travel preparation, research, personal development and cross-cultural communication. Customised courses are designed to offer flexibility in course content, structure and teaching style at venues and times that suit the needs of students. Qualified and experienced tutors are selected specifically for each organisation or individual.

=== Summer high school program ===
These language enrichment courses are designed for students in the Senior phase of learning who wish to enrich their knowledge of the language and culture they are currently studying and practise their language skills over the long Summer holidays. The courses are taught by native speakers with a focus on enhancing fluency and accuracy of expression, with content based on themes and topics specified in the QSA Senior Syllabus.
