= Kyoji Saito =

Japanese mathematician (born 1944)

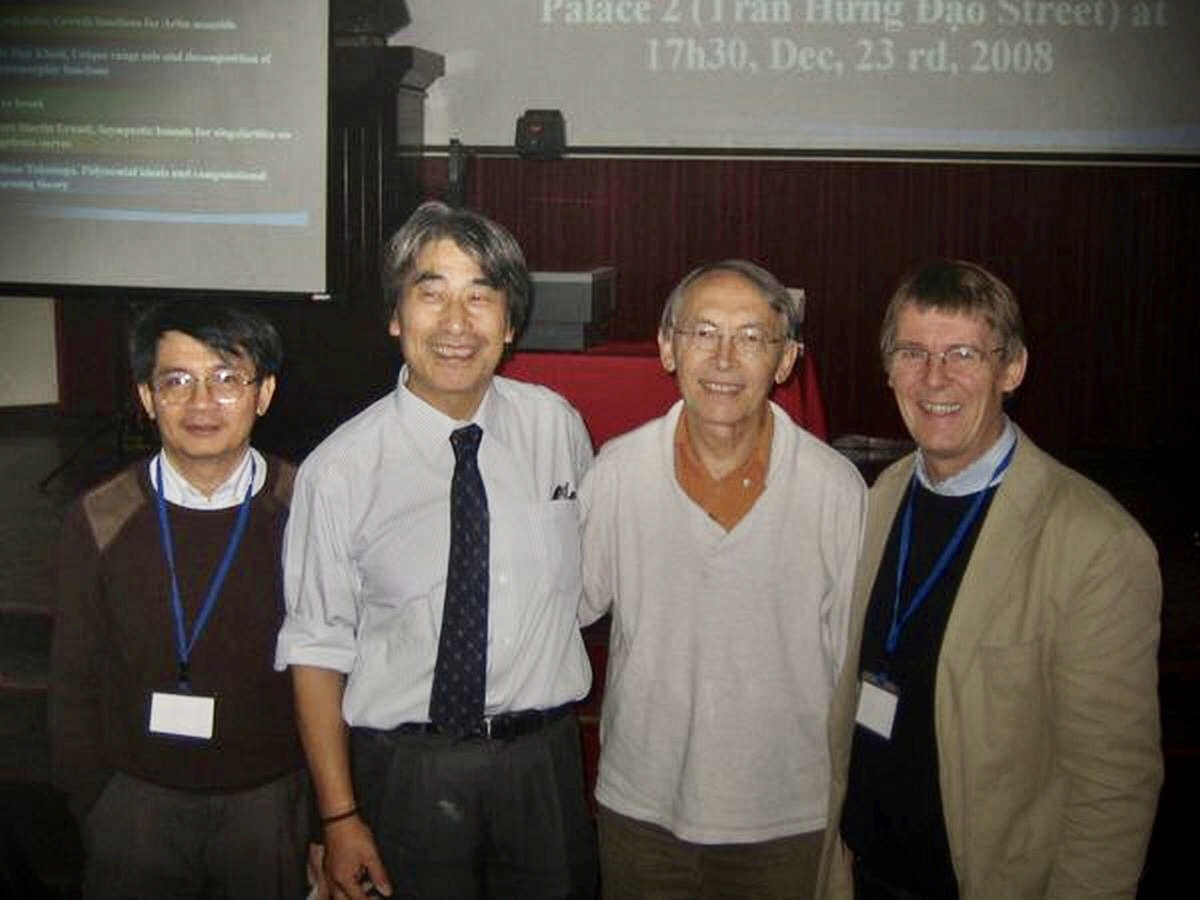
from left: Ngô Việt Trung, Kyoji Saito, Frédéric Pham, Gert-Martin Greuel at Dalat University in 2008

Kyōji Saitō (齋藤 恭司, Saitō Kyōji; born 25 December 1944) is a Japanese mathematician, specializing in algebraic geometry and complex analytic geometry.

== Education and career ==
Saito received in 1971 his promotion Ph.D. from the University of Göttingen under Egbert Brieskorn, with thesis Quasihomogene isolierte Singularitäten von Hyperflächen (Quasihomogeneous isolated singularities of hypersurfaces). Saito is a professor at the Research Institute for Mathematical Sciences (RIMS) of Kyoto University.

Saito's research deals with the interplay among Lie algebras, reflection groups (Coxeter groups), braid groups, and singularities of hypersurfaces.

From the 1980s, he did research on underlying symmetries of period integrals in complex hypersurfaces. Saito introduced higher-dimensional generalizations of elliptic integrals. These generalizations are integrals of "primitive forms", first considered in the study of the unfolding of isolated singularities of complex hypersurfaces, associated with infinite-dimensional Lie algebras. He also studied the corresponding new automorphic forms. The theory has a geometric connection to "flat structures" (now called "Saito Frobenius manifolds"), mirror symmetry, Frobenius manifolds, and Gromov–Witten theory in algebraic geometry and various topics in mathematical physics related to string theory.

Saito supervised the thesis of 7 Ph.D. students at Kyoto University, including Hiroaki Terao and Masahiko Yoshinaga.

He was an Invited Speaker with talk The limit element in the configuration algebra for a discrete group: a précis at the International Congress of Mathematicians 1990 in Kyoto. In 2011 he was awarded the Geometry Prize of the Mathematical Society of Japan.

== Selected publications ==
- Brieskorn, Egbert; Saito, Kyoji (1972). "Artin-Gruppen und Coxeter-Gruppen". Inventiones Mathematicae. 17 (4): 245–271. Bibcode:1972InMat..17..245B. doi:10.1007/BF01406235. MR 0323910. S2CID 120737658.
- Saito, Kyoji (1980). "Theory of logarithmic differential forms and logarithmic vector fields". J. Fac. Sci. Univ. Tokyo Sect. IA Math. 27 (2): 265–291. hdl:2261/6265. MR 0586450.
- Saito, Kyoji (1982). "Primitive forms for a universal unfolding of a function with an isolated critical point". J. Fac. Sci. Univ. Tokyo Sect. IA Math. 28 (3): 775–792. hdl:2261/6324. MR 0656053.
- Saito, Kyoji (1983). "Period mapping associated to a primitive form". Publ. Res. Inst. Math. Sci. 19 (3): 1231–1264. doi:10.2977/prims/1195182028. MR 0723468.
- as editor with and Masaki Kashiwara, Atsushi Matsuo, and Ikuo Satake: Topological Field Theory, Primitive Forms and Related Topics, Birkhäuser Verlag, Progress in Mathematics, 1998
- Saito, Kyoji; Takahashi, Atsuki (2008), "From primitive forms to Frobenius manifolds", From Hodge theory to integrability and TQFT: tt*-geometry, Proceedings of Symposia in Pure Mathematics, vol. 78, American Mathematical Society, pp. 31–48, CiteSeerX 10.1.1.307.1944, doi:10.1090/pspum/078/2483747, ISBN 9780821844304, MR 2483747
- Primitive automorphic forms, in Björn Engquist, Wilfried Schmid (eds.) Mathematics Unlimited - 2000 and beyond, Springer Verlag 2001, pp. 1003–1018
- Around the theory of the general weight system: relations with singularity theory, the generalized Weyl group and its invariant theory, etc., in Katsumi Nomizu Selected papers on harmonic analysis, groups and invariants, AMS Translations, Series 2, vol. 183, 1991
- as editor with Bernard Teissier and Lê Dũng Tráng: Singularity Theory, World Scientific 1995
- Saito, Kyoji (2006). "Eta-product $\eta (7\tau)^ 7/\eta (\tau)$". arXiv:math/0602367.
