= Rie =

- Gender: female

Origin
- Origin: Japanese, Dutch
- Meaning: different meanings depending on the kanji used

Other names
- Related names: Eri, Rei, Rieko; Ria

Rie is a Japanese (Japanese: 利恵, りえ, リエ) and Dutch feminine given name. It is also an uncommon masculine short form of Henri and a surname.

== Japanese given name ==
Rie can be written using different kanji characters and can mean:

- 理恵, "logic, blessing "
- 利恵, "value, blessing"
- 梨絵, "pear, picture"
- 理江, "logic, inlet"
- 理絵, "logic, picture"
- 里枝, "village, branch"
- 梨恵, "pear, blessing"
- 里依, "village, reliable"

The name can also be written in hiragana or katakana. People with this name include:

- Rie, a Japanese fashion model
- Rie Arikawa (有川 梨絵), a Japanese retired ice dancer
- Rie Azami (薊 理絵, born 1989), a Japanese football player
- Rie Eto (衛藤 利恵), a Japanese music artist
- Rie Fu (リエ), a Japanese singer-songwriter
- Rie Ishizuka (石塚 理恵), a Japanese voice actress
- Rie Isogai (磯谷 利恵), a Japanese murder victim
- Rie Kitahara (北原 里英), member of Japanese idol group sensation AKB48
- Rie Kanda (神田 理江), a Japanese voice actress
- Rie Kimura (木村 理恵; born 1971), Japanese women's footballer
- Rie Kugimiya (釘宮 理恵, born 1979) a Japanese voice actress
- Rie Kaela Kimura (木村カエラりえ), Japanese singer, songwriter, model, and presenter
- Rie Matsuoka (松岡 理恵; born 1977), Japanese long-distance runner
- Rie Miyazawa (宮沢 りえ), a Japanese actress and singer
- Rie Murakawa (村川 梨衣; born 1990), Japanese voice actress and singer
- Rie Nakamura (中村 理恵; born 1974), better known as Bad Nurse Nakamura, Japanese professional wrestler
- Rie Oh (王 理恵), the second daughter of world home run king, Sadaharu Oh
- Rie Sato (ice hockey) (佐藤 理絵; born 1972), Japanese ice hockey player
- Rie Sato (softball) (佐藤 理恵; born 1980), Japanese softball player
- Rie Sato (speed skater) (佐藤 利江; born 1972), Japanese speed skater
- Rie Saito (斉藤 里恵, born 1984), Japanese politician and writer
- Rie Shito (司東 利恵; born 1973), Japanese swimmer
- Rie Suegara (末柄 里恵), Japanese voice actress
- Rie Takada (高田 りえ), a Japanese manga artist
- Rie Takahashi (高橋 李依; born 1994), Japanese voice actress and singer
- Rie Tanaka (田中 理恵, born 1979), a Japanese singer and voice actress
- Rie Terazono (寺園 理恵), a Japanese field hockey goalkeeper
- Rie Tomosaka (ともさか りえ/友坂 理恵), a Japanese actress
- Rie Ueno (上野 理恵), a Japanese long-distance runner
- Rie Yamaki (山木 里恵; born 1975), Japanese women's footballer
- Rie Yasumi (やすみ りえ), a Japanese Senryū poet
- Rie Yoshiyuki (吉行 理恵; 1939–2006), Japanese poet and writer

Fictional Characters

- Rie Aoi (藍 リエ), a character from Chōjin Sentai Jetman
- Rie Misumi (美墨 理恵), a character in the anime series Futari wa Pretty Cure
- Rie Yamabishi (山菱 理恵), a character in the manga series Spriggan

== Dutch feminine name ==
The Dutch name is usually a short form of Maria or Hendrika.

- Rie de Balbian Verster-Bolderhey (1890–1990), Dutch painter
- Rie de Boois (1936–2010), Dutch politician
- Rie Beisenherz (1901–1992), Dutch swimmer
- Rie Briejèr (1910–1999), Dutch sprinter and long jumper
- Rie Cramer (1887–1977), Dutch writer and illustrator
- Rie Mastenbroek (1919–2003), Dutch swimmer
- Rie Muñoz (1921–2015), Dutch-born American artist and educator
- Rie Rasmussen (born 1978), Danish fashion model, actress, film director, writer and photographer
- Rie van Veen (1923–1995), Dutch swimmer
- Rie Vierdag (1905–2005), Dutch swimmer

== Masculine given name ==
- Rie Meert (1920–2006), Belgian footballer (Henri)

== Surname ==
- An Van Rie, a Belgian racing cyclist
- Lucie Rie, an Austrian-born British studio potter

== See also ==
- Rye (disambiguation)
