= Bogdan Suceavă =

Romanian mathematician, educator, and writer

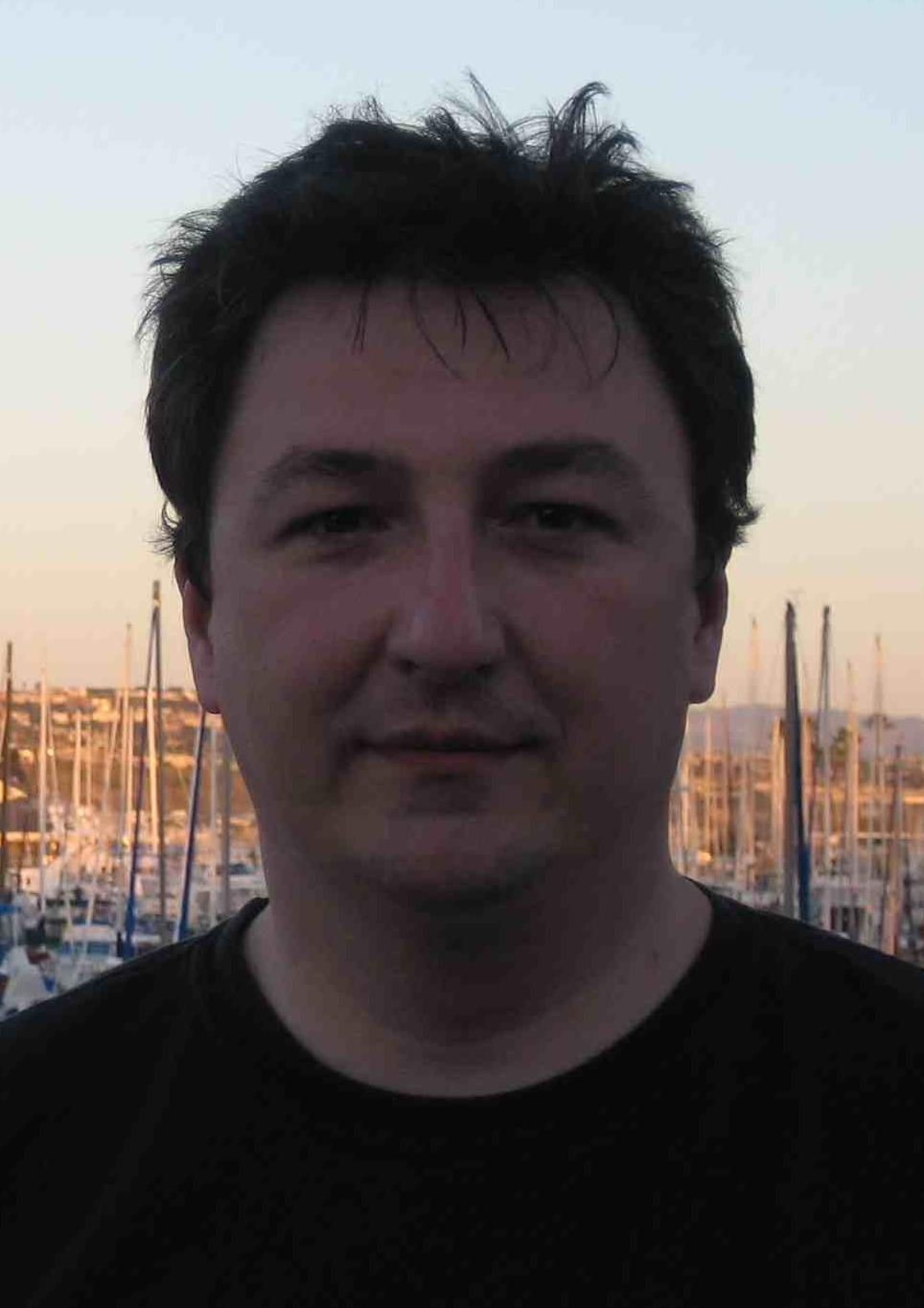
- Born: September 27, 1969; Curtea de Argeș, Socialist Republic of Romania
- Citizenship: Romania, United States
- Education: University of Bucharest; Michigan State University
- Known for: "Coming from An Off-Key Time", "Miruna, A Tale"
- Awards: Bucharest Writers Association Fiction Award (2007); Honorary citizen of Târgoviște (2016); Mathematical Association of America George Pólya Award (2020); Medal of Honor, Romanian Society for Mathematical Sciences (2020); L. Donald Shields Award, Cal State Fullerton (2023)
- Scientific career
- Fields: Romanian literature, Differential geometry, History of mathematics
- Workplaces: California State University, Fullerton
- Thesis: New Riemannian and Kählerian Curvature Invariants and Strongly Minimal Submanifolds
- Doctoral advisor: Bang-Yen Chen

Bogdan Suceavă (born September 27, 1969) is a Romanian-American mathematician and writer, working since 2002 as professor of mathematics at California State University Fullerton. He is also an honorary research professor with the STAR-UBB Institute, Babeș-Bolyai University, Cluj-Napoca, Romania.

== Biography ==
He was born in Curtea de Argeș, Romania. Growing up, Suceavă spent his holidays with his maternal grandparents at Nucșoara, a remote community that maintained its traditions, unbroken by the collectivisation elsewhere of Nicolae Ceaușescu's regime. There he absorbed Balkan folk-tales and myths, which would inform some of his literary works. Suceavă mentioned his maternal grandmother was a cousin of Elisabeta Rizea, a figure of the Romanian anti-communist resistance movement.

Suceavă went to school in Pitești, Găești, Târgoviște, and Bucharest, as his family moved several times. He completed his secondary education at the Ion Luca Caragiale High School in Bucharest; in the summer of 1988, he faced Nicușor Dan in a mathematics high school competition, but lost to him. After the Romanian Revolution of 1989, Suceavă attended the University of Bucharest, where he obtained his undergraduate degree in mathematics and master's degree in mathematics, with a focus on geometry. He then moved to the United States to study at the Michigan State University for his doctorate. His thesis, titled New Riemannian and Kählerian Curvature Invariants and Strongly Minimal Submanifolds, was written under the supervision of Bang-Yen Chen.

Following his doctorate in 2002, Suceavă was hired by California State University, Fullerton. In the spring of 2023 Suceavă was presented at California State University, Fullerton with the L. Donald Shields Excellence in Scholarship and Creativity Award.

== Career ==
=== Mathematics ===
At the age of 13, Suceavă won a prize at the Romanian National Mathematical Olympiad, following which he was encouraged to pursue mathematics as a viable career. During his undergraduate years he studied mathematical analysis with Solomon Marcus and Ion Colojoară, algebra with Constantin Vraciu and Constantin Niță, geometry with Adriana Turtoi, Stere Ianuș, and Liviu Nicolescu, among others. He was classmate with Nicușor Dan, later President of Romania, who started studying mathematics at the University of Bucharest in the same cohort. At Michigan State University Suceavă took courses with Selman Akbulut, Bang-Yen Chen, John D. McCarthy, Thomas Parker, Baisheng Yan, and others.

Since 2002, Suceavă is a Professor of Mathematics at California State University, Fullerton. He specialises in differential geometry, metric geometry, and the history of mathematics.

Suceavă is active in the encouragement of mathematical research among young students in California. He has established a mathematical circle involving high-school students and undergraduates, and extensively published in various journals mathematical problems aimed at high-school students.

While being an educator, Suceavă pursued his research inquiries. His research mathematical works appeared in Houston Journal of Mathematics, Taiwanese Journal of Mathematics, American Mathematical Monthly, Mathematical Intelligencer, Beiträge zur Algebra und Geometrie, Differential Geometry and Its Applications, Czechoslovak Mathematical Journal, Publicationes Mathematicae, Results in Mathematics, Tsukuba Journal of Mathematics, Notices of the American Mathematical Society, Contemporary Mathematics, Historia Mathematica, and other mathematical journals.

On October 21, 2017, Suceavă delivered one of the invited addresses at the Fall 2017 Meeting of the Southern California Nevada Mathematical Association of America. His conference was titled "Curvature: From Nicole Oresme (1320-1382) to Contemporary Interpretations."

Suceavă served as editor, together with Alfonso Carriazo, Yun Myung Oh and Joeri Van Der Veken, of the volume Recent Advances in the Geometry of Submanifolds. Dedicated to the Memory of Franki Dillen (1963-2013), American Mathematical Society, 2016.

In July 2020, Suceavă is one of the co-authors of the paper Eclectic Illuminism: Applications of Affine Geometry. The College Mathematics Journal, 50(2), 82–92, written with A. Glesser, M. Rathbun, and I. M. Serrano, presented with 2020 MAA's George Pólya Award. The title of the paper is a reference to a phrase used by Dan Barbilian to describe Felix Klein's Erlangen Programm. In MAA's press release, it is stated that "this paper presents deep intellectual thought and is very engaging for all readers."

On September 15, 2020, the Romanian Society for Mathematical Sciences presented Suceavă with their Medal of Honor, for his "outstanding work in promoting the Mathematical Gazette in the world, and for outstanding results in pursuing and developing the seminal research of several Romanian mathematicians who worked at the beginning of the 20th century" (a reference to Gheorghe Țițeica and Dan Barbilian).

On October 20–21, 2018, at the 1143rd Meeting of the American Mathematical Society held at Ann Arbor, Michigan, one of the Special Sessions was dedicated to Bang-Yen Chen's 75th birthday. The volume 756 in the Contemporary Mathematics series, published by the American Mathematical Society, is dedicated to Bang-Yen Chen, and it includes many contributions presented in the Ann Arbor event. The volume is edited by Joeri Van der Veken, Alfonso Carriazo, Ivko Dimitrić, Yun Myung Oh, Bogdan Suceavă, and Luc Vrancken.

On November 23, 2021, the American Mathematical Society announced that the Department of Mathematics at Cal State Fullerton is the recipient of the 2022 AMS Award for Mathematics Programs That Make a Difference. In their quotation, AMS wrote: "The department is recognized for its excellent record of mentoring and graduating students from underrepresented groups." In one of the interviews following the official announcements, Suceavă said We aspire to combine the best qualities of teaching and research where actively engaged students, faculty and staff work in close collaboration. Our philosophy is to enhance scholarly and creative activity. As such, we have directed a significant portion of our efforts to developing a culture of student-faculty research, and accelerating the path toward preparing new scholars to meet the upcoming challenges.

=== Literary ===
Suceavă began his writing career in 1990 with a volume of prose and essays published by Topaz, Teama de amurg ("Fear of twilight"). He has also published various volumes of novels and short stories.

While Suceavă writes predominantly in Romanian, his short fiction in English has appeared in Review of Contemporary Fiction, Absinthe: New European Writing, and Red Mountain Review.

In 1989, Suceavă was a freshman student in Bucharest during the downfall of the Ceaușescu dictatorship; based on his experience he wrote the novel The Night Someone Died for You, in which he reconstructs the tale of a private killed in friendly fire during the Romanian revolution. The impact on his country's social and cultural life of the subsequent transition motivated him to write his novel Venea din timpul diez in 2004. Later on, Suceavă described his novels as a cycle of narratives focused on transformations of the Romanian society. His novel The Republic (2016) is about a failed coup d'état attempt from 1870, and it showcases the transformation of the Romanian society into a modern environment where open criticism to the political power is possible. In that novel a young Ion Luca Caragiale appears as a character and participant to the political events.

In 2007, Suceavă received the Fiction Award of the Association of Bucharest Writers for his novel, Miruna, a Tale. Suceavă describes Miruna, a Tale as an account of how the South Eastern European traditional society gradually transformed into a more modern world. The main character in the novel, Niculae Berca, seems to be inspired from the biography of Suceavă's maternal grandfather, who fought in both WW I and WW II in the Romanian Army and survived major battles.

Two of his books (Coming from an Off-Key Time, and Miruna, A Tale) have been translated into English, and received positive reviews.

In 2015, the Czech version of the novel Coming from an Off-Key Time, in Jiří Našinec's translation, was presented with the Josef Jungmann Award.

Suceavă presented his books to Salon du Livre (Paris, 2013, Romania as invited nation), Festival of the Book Budapest (2009, Romania as invited nation), Vilenica Festival (Slovenia, 2016), Turin International Bookfair (2015), Prague Book Fair (2014), New Literature from Europe Festival (New York, 2015), FILIT - International Festival of Literature and Translation, Iași (2014 and 2019), and in many academic events focused mainly on Eastern European fiction in the US, in Romania, and other places. In the US, Suceavă participated several times to the Association of Literary Translators in America meetings, and presented his literary works in the academic environment at UC San Diego, Columbia University, UCLA, U. Texas at Dallas, Cal State Northridge, Chapman University, Cal State Fullerton, Arizona State University, among other places.

In Romania, three of Suceavă's novels are in print as mass market paperback in Polirom Press's series Top +10: Coming from an Off-Key Time, Miruna, A Tale, and Avalon. Secrets of Happy Immigrants.

== Bibliography ==
=== Literature ===
- Teama de amurg, Editura Topaz, Bucharest (1990)
- Sub semnul Orionului, Editura Artprint, Bucharest (1992) – novel
- Legende și eresuri, Magic Art Design, Bucharest (1995) – poetry
- Năluci și portrete, Ed. Nemira, Bucharest (2001); Ed. LiterNet (2011) – poetry
- Imperiul generalilor târzii și alte istorii, Editura Dacia (2002) – short stories
- Bunicul s-a întors la franceză, istorii, Editura T/Fundația Timpul, Iași (2003) - short stories
- Venea din timpul diez, Editura Polirom, Bucharest (2004) – novel (Coming from an Off-Key Time, translated by Alistair Ian Blyth, Northwestern University Press, 2011)
- Bătălii și mesagii, Editura LiterNet, Bucharest (2005) - poetry
- Miruna, o poveste, Editura Curtea Veche, Bucharest (2007) – novel (Miruna, A Tale, translated by Alistair Ian Blyth, Twisted Spoon Press, Prague, 2014.)
- Distanțe, demoni, aventuri, Editura Tritonic, Bucharest (2007) - essays
- Vincent nemuritorul, Editura Curtea Veche, Bucharest (2008) – novel
- Noaptea când cineva a murit pentru tine, Editura Polirom, Bucharest (2010) – novel
- Memorii din biblioteca ideală, Editura Polirom, Bucharest (2013) – essays
- Să auzi forma unei tobe, Millennium Books, Satu Mare (2013) - collected short stories
- Scrisori de la Polul Est, Editura Agol, Bucharest (2015) - essays
- Republica, Editura Polirom, Iași (2016) - novel
- Istoria lacunelor. Despre manuscrise pierdute, Editura Polirom, Iași (2017) - essay
- Avalon. Secretele emigranților fericiți, Editura Polirom, Iași (2018) - novel
- Vincent nemuritorul, Editura Polirom, Iași (2019) - novel
- Peisaj de furtună la Indianapolis, Editura Vremea, Bucharest (2022) - poetry
- Adâncul acestei calme creste. Programul de la Erlangen și poetica Jocului secund, Editura Polirom, Iași (2022) - essay
- Furtuna barocă, Editura Polirom, Iași (2024) - essay

=== Mathematics ===
1. Suceavă, Bogdan (2001). "The Chen invariants of warped products of hyperbolic planes and their applications to immersibility problems" (PDF). Tsukuba Journal of Mathematics. 25 (2): 311–320. doi:10.21099/tkbjm/1496164290.
2. Suceavă, Bogdan (2002). New Riemannian and Kählerian Curvature Invariants and Strongly Minimal Submanifolds. Michigan State University. Department of Mathematics. ISBN 9780493689081.
3. Yiu, Paul; Suceavă, Bogdan (2006). "The Feuerbach point and Euler lines". Forum Geometricorum. 6: 191–197.
4. Boskoff, Wladimir; Suceavă, Bogdan (2008). "A projective characterization of cyclicity". Beiträge zur Algebra und Geometrie. 49 (1): 195–203.
5. Suceavă, Bogdan (2010). "Tzitzeica Curves and Surfaces". Mathematica Journal. 12., with A.F. Agnew, A. Bobe, W.G. Boskoff.
6. Suceavă, Bogdan (2011). "Distances generated by Barbilian's metrization procedure by oscillation of sub logarithmic functions". Houston Journal of Mathematics. 37: 147–159.
7. Suceavă, Bogdan (2013). "New Curvature Inequalities for Hypersurfaces in the Euclidean Ambient Space". Taiwanese Journal of Mathematics. 17 (3): 885–895. doi:10.11650/tjm.17.2013.2504., with C.T.R. Conley, R. Etnyre, B. Gardener, L. H. Odom
8. Suceavă, Bogdan (2015). "A Medieval Mystery: Nicole Oresme's Concept of Curvitas" (PDF). Notices of the American Mathematical Society. 62 (9): 1030–1034. doi:10.1090/noti1275., with Isabel M. Serrano
