= Eri (given name) =

- Gender: Female

Origin
- Origin: Japanese
- Meaning: different meanings depending on the kanji

Other names
- Related names: Eriko, Erika, Rie, Andrea

Eri (えり, エリ) is a common feminine Japanese given name.

== Written forms ==
Eri can be written using different kanji characters and can mean:

- 恵理, "blessing, reason"
- 絵里, "picture, hometown"
- 絵梨, "picture, pear"
- 絵理, "picture, reason"
- 江里, "inlet, hometown"
- 恵里, "blessing, hometown"
- 恵利, "blessing, profit"
- 江利, "inlet, profit"
- 恵梨, "blessing, pear"
- 枝里, "branch, hometown"
- 英梨, "excel, pear"
- 英里, "excel, hometown"
- 愛利, "love, clever"
- 愛理, “loving reason”

The name can also be written in hiragana or katakana.

== People with the name ==
- Eri Fukatsu (絵里, born 1973), Japanese actress
- Eri Ishida (born 1960), Japanese actress
- Eri Itō (恵里), Japanese vocalist
- Eri Kamei (絵里, born 1988), member of the Japanese pop group Morning Musume
- Eri Kawai (英里, 1965–2008), Japanese singer
- Eri Kikuchi (born 1965), 1980s Japanese AV idol
- Eri Kimura (木村 衣里; born 1973), Japanese swimmer
- Eri Kitamura (英梨, born 1987), Japanese voice actress and singer
- Eri Murakawa (絵梨, born 1987), Japanese actress
- Eri Natori (名取 英理; born 1985), Japanese speed skater
- Eri Nitta (恵利, born 1968), Japanese idol and singer
- Eri Nobuchika (エリ, born 1985), Japanese pop singer and songwriter
- Eri Sendai (仙台 エリ, born 1981), Japanese voice actress
- Eri Shingyōji (恵里, born 1974), Japanese rock singer
- Eri Tokunaga (politician) (born 1962), Japanese politician and former TV reporter
- Eri Tokunaga (actress) (born 1988), Japanese actress
- Eri Uchinaga (内永 枝利, born 2000) stage name Giselle, Japanese-Korean member of South Korean girl group Aespa
- Eri Yamada (山田 恵里; born 1984), Japanese softball player
- Eri Yamaguchi (衛里, born 1973), Japanese long-distance runner
- Eri Yamanoi (絵理, born 1978), Japanese former freestyle swimmer
- Eri Yanetani (born 1984), Japanese snowboarder
- Eri Yoshida (吉田 えり; born 1992), Japanese baseball player
- Eri Yukimura (幸村 恵理; born 1998), Japanese voice actress

Non-Japanese people with the name Eri

- Eri Cahyadi (born 1977) Indonesian politician, incumbent Mayor of Surabaya (2020–)
- Eri D. Woodbury (1837–1928), Union Army officer during the American Civil War
- Eri Marina Yo (born 1987), Indonesian inline speed skater

== Fictional characters ==
- Eri (絵理), a character in the manga series InuYasha
- Eri (My Hero Academia), a character in the manga series My Hero Academia
- Eri Minami, Yuuta's step-mother in the game Persona 4
- Eri Kasamoto (エリ), a playable character in the game series Metal Slug
- Eri Kasuga, a character from anime and manga Chimpui
- Eri Kisaki, Ran's mother in the manga series Detective Conan
- Eri Sawachika (愛理), in the anime and manga series School Rumble
- Eri Miyanoshita (宮ノ下), a character in manga series Haikyū!!.
- Eri Takigawa (エリ), in the Japanese television drama Last Friends
- Eri, in the manga adaptation of Candy Boy
- Eri Ninamori, in the anime series FLCL
- Eri Asai, in Haruki Murakami's novel After Dark
- Eri Shina, in the anime Angel Beats!
- Eri Ayase, one of the nine main characters from the anime Love Live! School Idol Project
- Eri Karan, a character from Digimon Universe: Appli Monsters
