= Tomoyuki Arakawa =

Japanese mathematician (born 1968)

Tomoyuki Arakawa (Japanese: 荒川 知幸; born 22 May 1968) is a Japanese mathematician, mathematical physicist, and a professor at the RIMS of the Kyoto University. His research interests are representation theory and vertex algebras and he is known especially for the work in W-algebras. He obtained his PhD from the University of Nagoya in 1999. In 2018 he was invited speaker at the International Congress of Mathematicians in Rio de Janeiro. He won the MSJ Autumn Prize in 2017 for his work on representation theory of W-algebras.

== Selected publications ==
- Arakawa, Tomoyuki (1 August 2007). "Representation theory of W-algebras". Inventiones Mathematicae. 169 (2): 219–320. doi:10.1007/s00222-007-0046-1. hdl:10935/1423. ISSN 1432-1297. S2CID 122047968.
- Arakawa, Tomoyuki (2015). "Rationality of W-algebras: principal nilpotent cases". Annals of Mathematics. 182 (2): 565–604. arXiv:1211.7124. doi:10.4007/annals.2015.182.2.4. ISSN 0003-486X. JSTOR 24523343. S2CID 53477362.
- Arakawa, Tomoyuki; Creutzig, Thomas; Linshaw, Andrew R. (1 October 2019). "W-algebras as coset vertex algebras". Inventiones Mathematicae. 218 (1): 145–195. arXiv:1801.03822. Bibcode:2019InMat.218..145A. doi:10.1007/s00222-019-00884-3. ISSN 1432-1297. S2CID 253745764.
