= Kentaro Yano (mathematician) =

Japanese mathematician

- 矢野健太郎
- Born: March 1, 1912
- Died: December 25, 1993 (aged 81); Tokyo, Japan
- Citizenship: Japan
- Education: University of Tokyo, Japan
- Scientific career
- Fields: Differential geometry, Riemannian Geometry
- Workplaces: University of Tokyo, Tokyo Institute of Technology
- Thesis: [Sur la théorie des espaces à connexion conforme Les espaces à connexion projective et la géométrie projective des "paths"] (1938)
- Doctoral advisor: Elie Cartan
- Doctoral students: Tadashi Nagano
- Other notable students: Shoshichi Kobayashi

Kentaro Yano (1 March 1912 in Tokyo, Japan – 25 December 1993) was a mathematician working on differential geometry who introduced the Bochner–Yano theorem.

He also published a classical book about geometric objects (i.e., sections of natural fiber bundles) and Lie derivatives of these objects.

== Publications ==
- Les espaces à connexion projective et la géométrie projective des paths, Iasi, 1938
- Geometry of Structural Forms (Japanese), 1947
- Groups of Transformations in Generalized Spaces, Tokyo, Akademeia Press, 1949
- with Salomon Bochner: Curvature and Betti Numbers, Princeton University Press, Annals of Mathematics Studies, 1953
- The Theory of Lie Derivatives and its Applications. North-Holland. 1957. ISBN 978-0-7204-2104-0. 2020 reprint
- Differential geometry on complex and almost complex spaces, Macmillan, New York 1965
- Integral formulas in Riemannian Geometry, Marcel Dekker, New York 1970
- with Shigeru Ishihara: Tangent and cotangent bundles: differential geometry, New York, M. Dekker 1973
- with Masahiro Kon: Anti-invariant submanifolds, Marcel Dekker, New York 1976
- Morio Obata (ed.): Selected papers of Kentaro Yano, North Holland 1982
- with Masahiro Kon: CR Submanifolds of Kählerian and Sasakian Manifolds, Birkhäuser 1983 2012 reprint
- with Masahiro Kon: Structures on Manifolds, World Scientific 1984
