= Hiraku Nakajima =

Japanese mathematician

- Born: November 30, 1962 (age 63); Tokyo
- Education: University of Tokyo
- Awards: Geometry Prize (1997); Cole Prize (2003)
- Scientific career
- Fields: Mathematics
- Workplaces: Kyoto University; Research Institute for Mathematical Sciences

Hiraku Nakajima (Japanese: 中島 啓, romanized: Nakajima Hiraku; born November 30, 1962) is a Japanese mathematician, and a professor of the Kavli Institute for the Physics and Mathematics of the Universe at the University of Tokyo. He is International Mathematical Union president for the 2023–2026 term.

He obtained his Ph.D. from the University of Tokyo in 1991. In 2002 he was plenary speaker at the International Congress of Mathematicians in Beijing. He won the 2003 Cole Prize in algebra for his work on representation theory and geometry. He proved Nekrasov's conjecture.

== Biography ==
- 1985 - BA from the University of Tokyo
- 1987 - MA from the University of Tokyo, and became a research associate at the University of Tokyo
- 1991 - PhD from the University of Tokyo
- 1992 - Associate professor at Tohoku University
- 1995 - Associate professor at the University of Tokyo
- 1997 - Associate professor at Kyoto University
- 2000 - Full professor at Kyoto University
- 2018 - Full professor at Kavli Institute for the Physics and Mathematics of the Universe

== Awards and prizes ==
- 1997 - Geometry Prize of the Mathematical Society of Japan
- 2000 - Spring Prize of the Mathematical Society of Japan
- 2003 - Cole Prize in algebra of the American Mathematical Society
- 2005 - JSPS prize of the Japan Society for the Promotion of Science
- 2014 - Japan Academy Prize

== Notable publications ==
- Shigetoshi Bando, Atsushi Kasue, and Hiraku Nakajima. On a construction of coordinates at infinity on manifolds with fast curvature decay and maximal volume growth. Invent. Math. 97 (1989), no. 2, 313–349. doi:10.1007/BF01389045
- Hiraku Nakajima. Instantons on ALE spaces, quiver varieties, and Kac-Moody algebras. Duke Math. J. 76 (1994), no. 2, 365–416. doi:10.1215/S0012-7094-94-07613-8
- Hiraku Nakajima. Heisenberg algebra and Hilbert schemes of points on projective surfaces. Ann. of Math. (2) 145 (1997), no. 2, 379–388. doi:10.2307/2951818, arXiv:alg-geom/9507012
- Hiraku Nakajima. Quiver varieties and Kac-Moody algebras. Duke Math. J. 91 (1998), no. 3, 515–560. doi:10.1215/S0012-7094-98-09120-7
- Hiraku Nakajima. Quiver varieties and finite-dimensional representations of quantum affine algebras. J. Amer. Math. Soc. 14 (2001), no. 1, 145–238. doi:10.1090/S0894-0347-00-00353-2
