= Tadashi Nagano =

Japanese mathematician

- 長野正
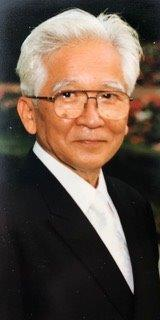
- Born: January 9, 1930; Taipei, Taiwan
- Died: February 1, 2017 (aged 87); Tokyo, Japan
- Education: University of Tokyo (PhD)
- Awards: Geometry Prize from Mathematical Society of Japan, 1994.
- Scientific career
- Fields: Differential geometry, Riemannian Geometry, Symmetric spaces
- Institutions: University of Notre Dame, University of Tokyo, Sophia University
- Thesis: On compact transformation groups with (n − 1)-dimensional orbits (1959)
- Doctoral advisor: Kentaro Yano
- Doctoral students: Bang-Yen Chen

Tadashi Nagano (長野正, Nagano Tadashi; January 9, 1930 – February 1, 2017) was a Taiwanese-born Japanese mathematician who worked mainly on differential geometry and related subjects.

== Biography ==
Nagano was born in Taipei in 1930, when Taiwan was under Japanese rule. He returned to Japan for undergraduate study from 1951 to 1954 at the University of Tokyo, and defended his doctoral thesis under Kentaro Yano's supervision at University of Tokyo in 1959. He worked at the University of Tokyo from April in 1959 to May 1967 as a lecturer (1959–1962) and as an assistant professor (1962–1967). Nagano moved to United States to pursue an academic career with the University of Notre Dame in 1967. He became a full professor of University of Notre Dame in 1969.

Tadashi Nagano was a visiting professor at University of California at Berkeley from 1962 to 1964, National Tsing Hua University in Taiwan twice, first in 1966 and then one more time in 1978. After a successful academic career with University of Notre Dame, Tadashi Nagano returned to Japan and became a professor with Sophia University in 1986. He retired from Sophia University at 70 years old in 2000.

Tadashi Nagano co-authored 10 papers with Shoshichi Kobayashi in the interval 1966–1972, including A theorem on filtered Lie algebras and its applications, Bull. Amer. Math. Soc. 70 1964, pp. 401–403.

Tadashi Nagano served an editor-in-chief of Tokyo Journal of Mathematics for several years since 1990. In 1994, Tadashi Nagano was presented with the Geometry Prize from Mathematical Society of Japan for his research achievements over a large field of the differential geometry including a geometric construction of compact symmetric spaces; known as the (M+,M-)-theory (or Chen-Nagano theory) co-created with Bang-Yen Chen.
