= Institute of Continuing & TESOL Education =

Institute in Brisbane teaching English

Institute of Continuing & TESOL Education (ICTE)
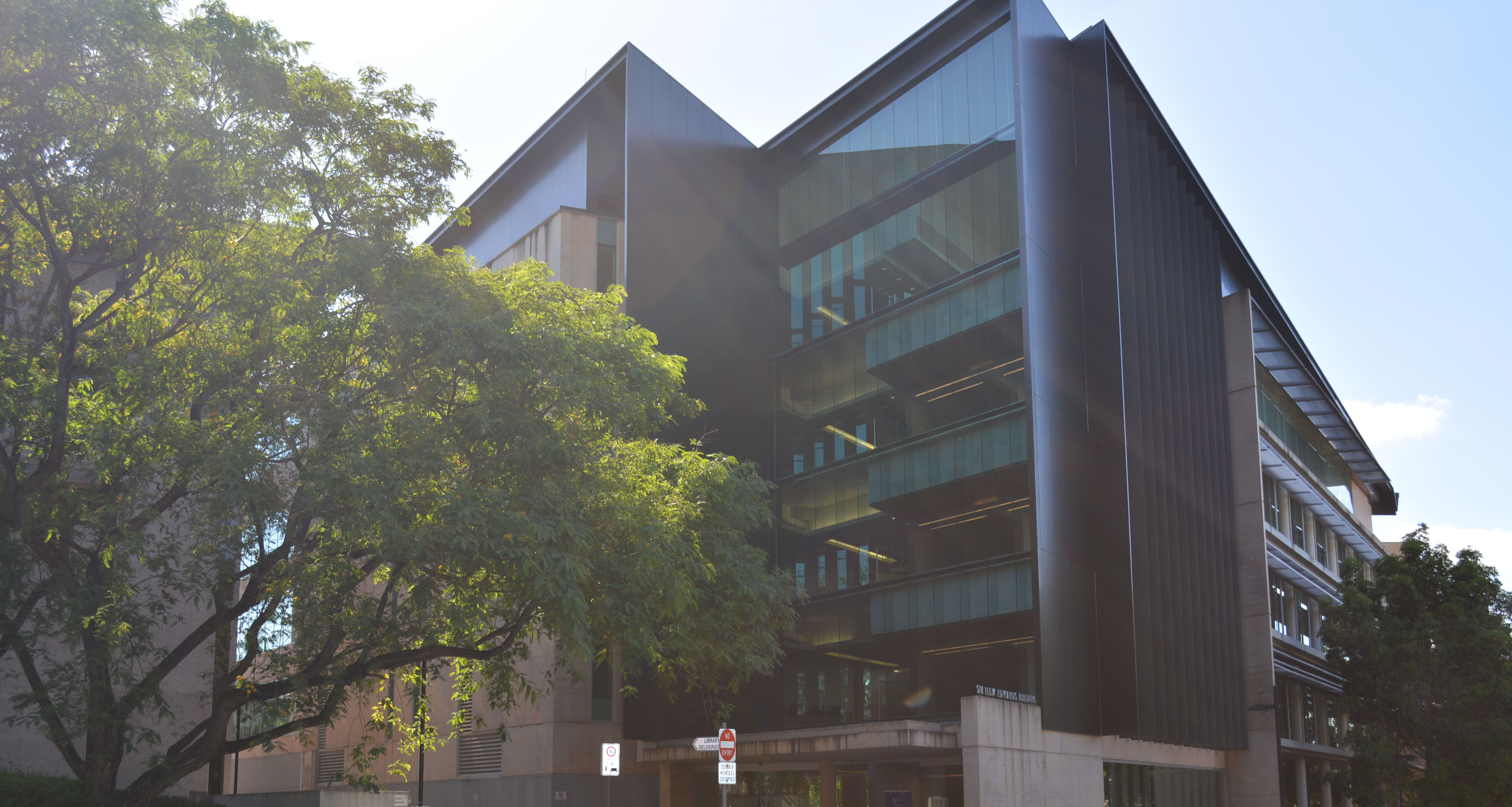
- Established: 1981
- Parent institution: The University of Queensland
- Director: Julian Wilson
- Students: 9,880
- Location: Brisbane, Queensland, Australia; 27.495351°S 153.0110943°E
- Website: https://icte.uq.edu.au

The Institute of Continuing & TESOL Education (ICTE) was a university department located in Brisbane, Australia specialising in English language courses, teacher training, professional development, and English language testing.

The Institute (ICTE) was a division of The University of Queensland (UQ), ranked among the world’s top 50 universities.

In 2021, the ICTE was merged with UQ College, a wholly owned subsidiary of The University of Queensland. Since the merger, UQ College has been delivering the English-language programs previously taught by ICTE, retaining many of the existing teachers, academics, and staff.

== Rankings ==
The University of Queensland ranks in the world’s top universities, as measured by key independent ranking including:

- QS World University Rankings
- Academic Ranking of World Universities. 2019 (54)
- Times Higher Education World University Rankings 2019 (69)

English language schools are not ranked like universities; however the Institute participated in an annual survey conducted by i-graduate International Insight with input from over 15,000 students and 60 language schools across Australia.

== Programs ==
=== English language courses ===
Intensive regular English courses are offered in five-week sessions from January to December annually. ICTE has an average yearly enrollment of over 4400 students from more than 50 countries and regions across Asia, Europe, the Pacific, Latin America, and the Middle East. Additionally, ICTE is engaged in creating, producing, and administering customized General English and English for Specific Purposes (ESP) programs for groups of students and professionals.

=== Continuing education ===
Programs include customised technical, academic or vocational programs, corporate training and professional development, and educational tours.

=== Teacher training and professional development ===
The Institute offers pre-service certificate programs, in-service professional development programs, language teaching management and leadership training as well as school governance and administration programs. Programs include:

- English language proficiency and methodology training, English for Specific Purposes: TESOL, testing and bench marking
- Curriculum and program analysis and development
- Organisational and academic leadership, including the International Diploma in Language Teaching Management (IDLTM), management and governance
- Content and Language Integrated Learning (CLIL)
- The Cambridge Certificate in Teaching English to Speakers of Other Languages (CELTA)
- Consultancy and capacity development services
- Delivery of Cambridge CELT-P and CELT-S online teacher training programs

ICTE teacher training program partners include international governments, boards of education, TESOL professional associations, universities, and primary and secondary schools in Chile, China, Ecuador, Germany, Hong Kong, Indonesia, Japan, Macau, Mexico, Oman, South Korea, Spain, Thailand and Vietnam.

=== Testing services ===
ICTE was Brisbane’s first International English Language Testing System (IELTS) test centre. Each year, the Institute administers thousands of IELTS tests, Occupational English Test (OET), Pearson Test of English (PTE) Academic, and Cambridge Teaching Knowledge Tests to candidates across South-East Queensland for academic pathway, immigration and professional purposes.

=== Customised programs ===
The Institute works collaboratively with program sponsors (partners) and education representatives to design and deliver customised programs in any location and in a wide range of discipline areas, with or without English language training. Customised program partners include Ministries of Education in Indonesia, Vietnam, Macau, Chile, and Saudi Arabia, and universities and government agencies across Asia, Europe, and Latin America.

== History ==
ICTE started in 1981 as a small, one-class English language training centre within the Institute of Modern Languages (Queensland) at The University of Queensland under a grant from the Australian Government's Australia-Japan Foundation. Several divisions at the university subsequently combined and were given the Institute's current name in 1996.

ICTE has expanded over time to include:

- The first IELTS test centre in Brisbane (1989)
- Bridging English for students offered a place at UQ (2008)
- UQ International Development division (2016), formerly a division of UniQuest, the university's main commercialisation company.

The Institute has grown an international network of over 165 partner organisations and 100 education representatives.

== Architecture and campus ==
The Institute is housed in the purpose-built Sir Llew Edwards Building, a $42 million edifice which involved three years of planning, design and construction and was completed in 2008.

The Institute is located at the St Lucia campus of The University of Queensland.
