= Yoshiko Ogata =

Japanese mathematical physicist

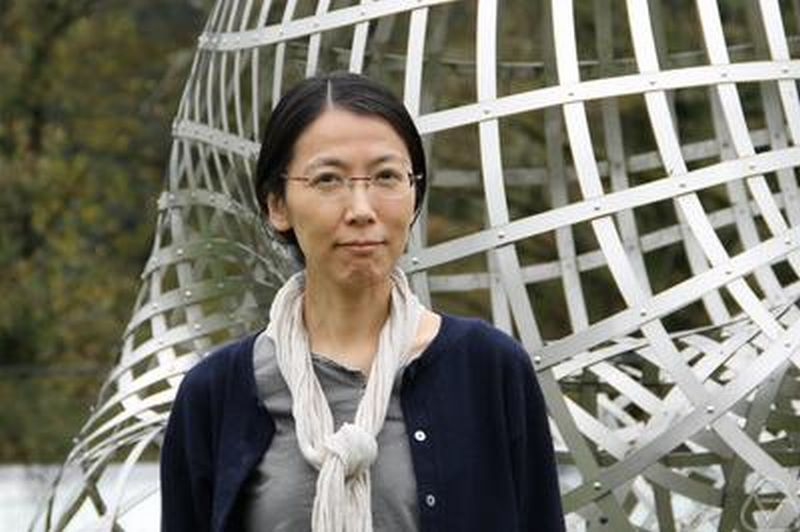
Ogata at Oberwolfach, 2019

Yoshiko Ogata (Japanese: 緒方 芳子) is a Japanese mathematical physicist whose research concerns quantum statistical mechanics, quantum information theory, and the quantum many-body problem. She is a professor of mathematics at the Research Institute for Mathematical Sciences, Kyoto University.

== Education and career ==
Ogata studied physics at the University of Tokyo at both the undergraduate and graduate level. After completing her Ph.D., and postdoctoral research at Aix-Marseille University and the University of California, Davis, she became a faculty member at Kyushu University. She returned to the University of Tokyo as a professor in 2009.

== Recognition ==
Ogata won the 2007 Takebe Katahiro Prize for Encouragement of Young Researchers, and the 2010 2nd Inoue Science Research Award. In 2014, she won the Young Scientists' Prize of the Commendation for Science and Technology of the Japanese Ministry of Education, Culture, Sports, Science and Technology, for "her researches on operator algebras and their applications to quantum statistical mechanics". She was the 2022 winner of the Autumn Prize of the Mathematical Society of Japan.

She was one of the 2021 winners of the Henri Poincaré Prize, honored for her "groundbreaking work on the mathematical theory of quantum spin systems, ranging from the formulation of Onsager reciprocity relations to innovative contributions to the theory of matrix product states and of symmetry-protected topological phases of infinite quantum spin chains".

She was an invited speaker at the 2022 International Congress of Mathematicians.

She won the 44th Saruhashi Prize in 2024 for "Mathematical Studies of Quantum Many-Body Systems".

She won the Asahi Prize in 2025 (fiscal 2024) for her research on "mathematical problems arising from quantum statistical mechanics". In the same year, she was listed on the Asian Scientist 100.
