= Reiko Tamura =

Reiko Tamura can refer to:

- A character in The Man with the Red Tattoo
- A character in Parasyte (known as Tamara Rockford in the Mixx version)
