= Reiko Miyaoka =

Japanese mathematician

Reiko Miyaoka (Japanese: 宮岡 礼子, born 1951) is a Japanese mathematician and professor at Tohoku University, known for her research on hypersurfaces. In 2001 she won the Geometry prize of the Mathematical Society of Japan. She received her Ph.D. in 1983 from Tokyo Institute of Technology. Her husband Yoichi Miyaoka is also a mathematician.
