= Narutaka Ozawa =

Japanese mathematician (born 1974)

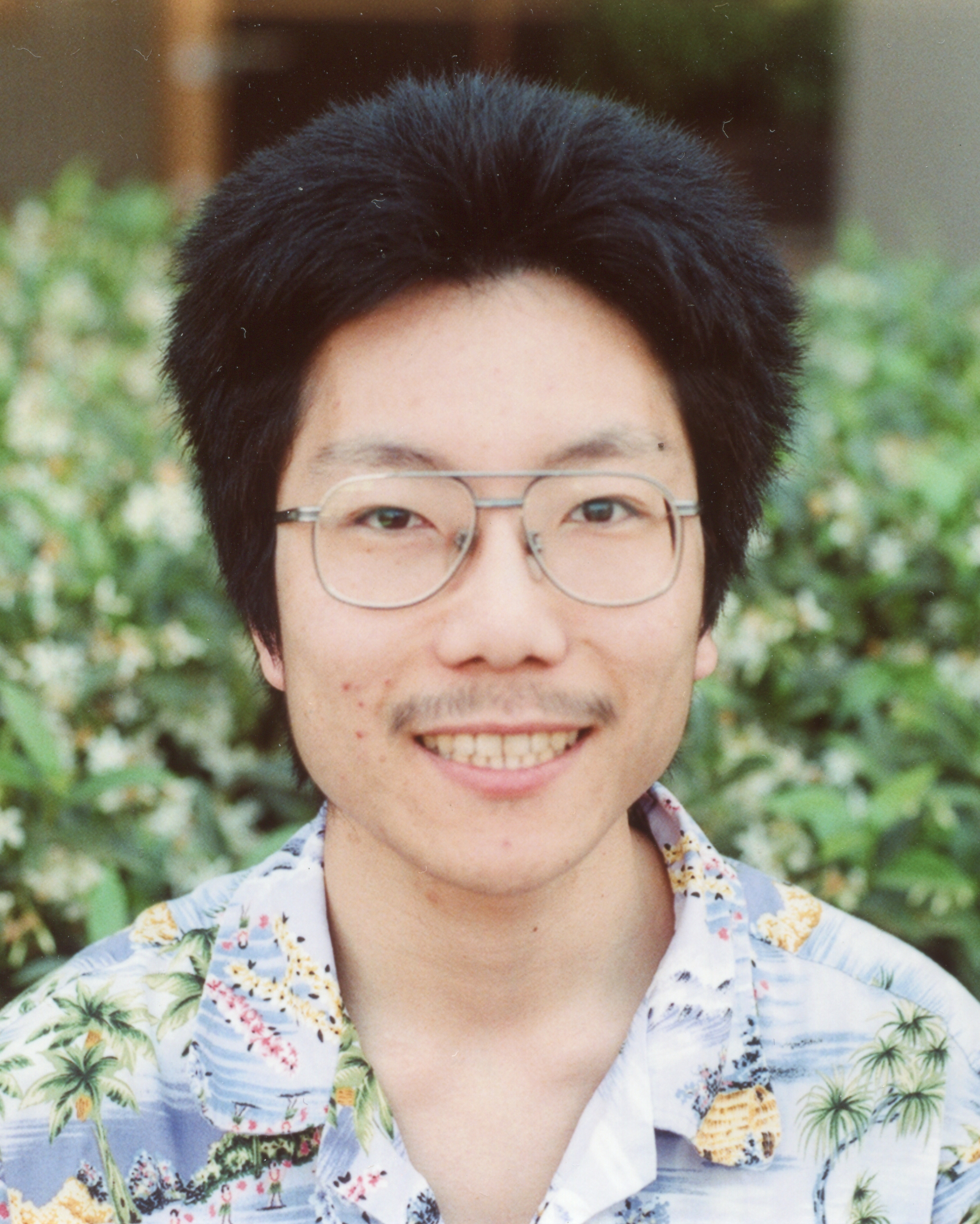
- Born: 1974 (age 51–52)
- Scientific career
- Fields: Mathematics

Narutaka Ozawa (小沢登高, Ozawa Narutaka) (born 1974) is a Japanese mathematician, known for his work in operator algebras and discrete groups. He has been a professor at Kyoto University since 2013. He earned a bachelor's degree in mathematics in 1997 from the University of Tokyo and a Ph.D. in mathematics in 2000 from the same institution. One year later he received a Ph.D. in mathematics from Texas A&M University. He was selected for one of the prestigious Sloan Research Fellowships in 2005 and was an invited speaker at the 2006 ICM in Madrid where he gave a talk on "Amenable actions and Applications". He has won numerous prizes including the Mathematical Society of Japan (MSJ) Spring Prize and the Japan Society for the Promotion of Science (JSPS) Prize. Before becoming a full professor at Kyoto University in 2013, he was an associate professor at the University of Tokyo and at University of California, Los Angeles.
