= Reiko Sakamoto (mathematician) =

Japanese mathematician

Reiko Sakamoto (Japanese: 坂本 礼子, born 1939) is a Japanese mathematician affiliated with Nara Women's University. Her teachers have included Sigeru Mizohata and Masaya Yamaguchi; her students have included Yoshihiro Shibata. She is known for her research on mixed boundary conditions for hyperbolic partial differential equations, for which she won the 1974 Iyanaga Prize of the Mathematical Society of Japan, and for her book on hyperbolic boundary value problems.
