= Tokyo Metropolitan University =

Japanese University

- 東京都立大学
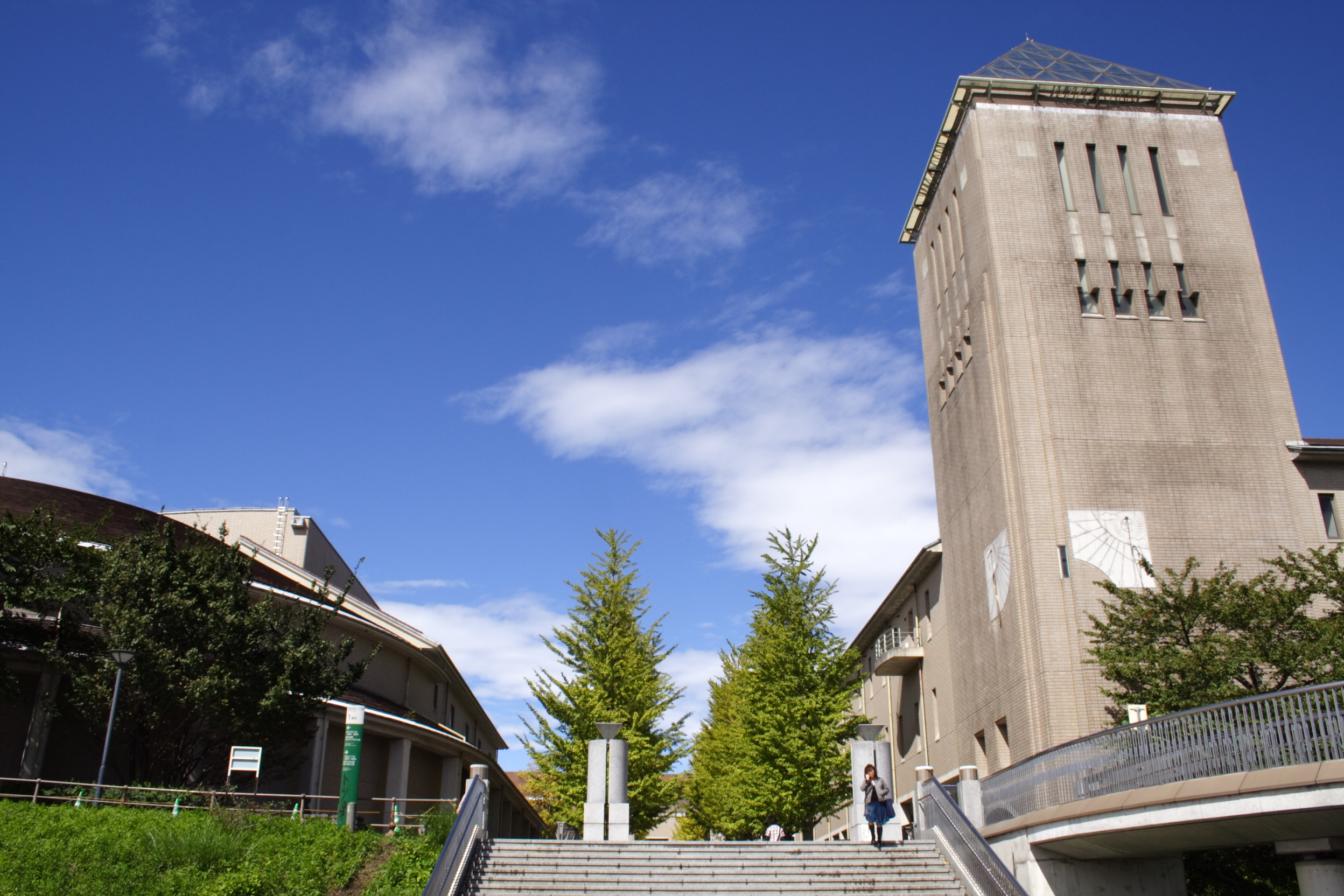
- Motto: To pursue the vision of an ideal human society in a metropolis
- Type: Public
- Established: 1949 (reformed in 2005)
- Faculty: 796 full-time
- Students: 9,056
- Undergraduates: 6,812
- Postgraduates: 2,234
- Other students: 10
- Location: Hachioji, Tokyo, Tokyo, Japan; 35°37′00″N 139°22′38″E
- Campus: Urban
- Colours: Black and blue gray
- Website: www.tmu.ac.jp

- Japan Tokyo Metropolis Tokyo Metropolitan University (Japan)
- As of May 1, 2008

Tokyo Metropolitan University (東京都立大学, Tōkyō Toritsu Daigaku), often referred to as TMU, is a public research university in Hachioji, Tokyo, Japan.

In contrast to other non-private universities in Tokyo, the university is established under the Tokyo Metropolitan Government, and not the national government.

== Origin ==
The origin of Tokyo Metropolitan University was Prefectural Higher School, under the old system of education, established by Tokyo Prefecture in 1929 as the third public higher school. The School was modelled on Eton College, with three years of pre-university advanced course and four years of university regular course.

The seven-year system had the advantage of guaranteeing entrance to the Imperial universities at the age of Middle School. Before the end of the Second World War, many academic elite would start their post-primary education in Tokyo First Middle School, proceed to the First Higher School, and then enroll at Tokyo Imperial University.

Since the jurisdiction control of Tokyo First Middle School and First Higher School were different, however, Tokyo First Middle School attempted to originally establish the prefectural higher school, whereas the other Middle Schools opposed to the said attempt. Prefectural Higher School was established in 1929 located in the same site of Tokyo First Middle School, as a result of the opposition.

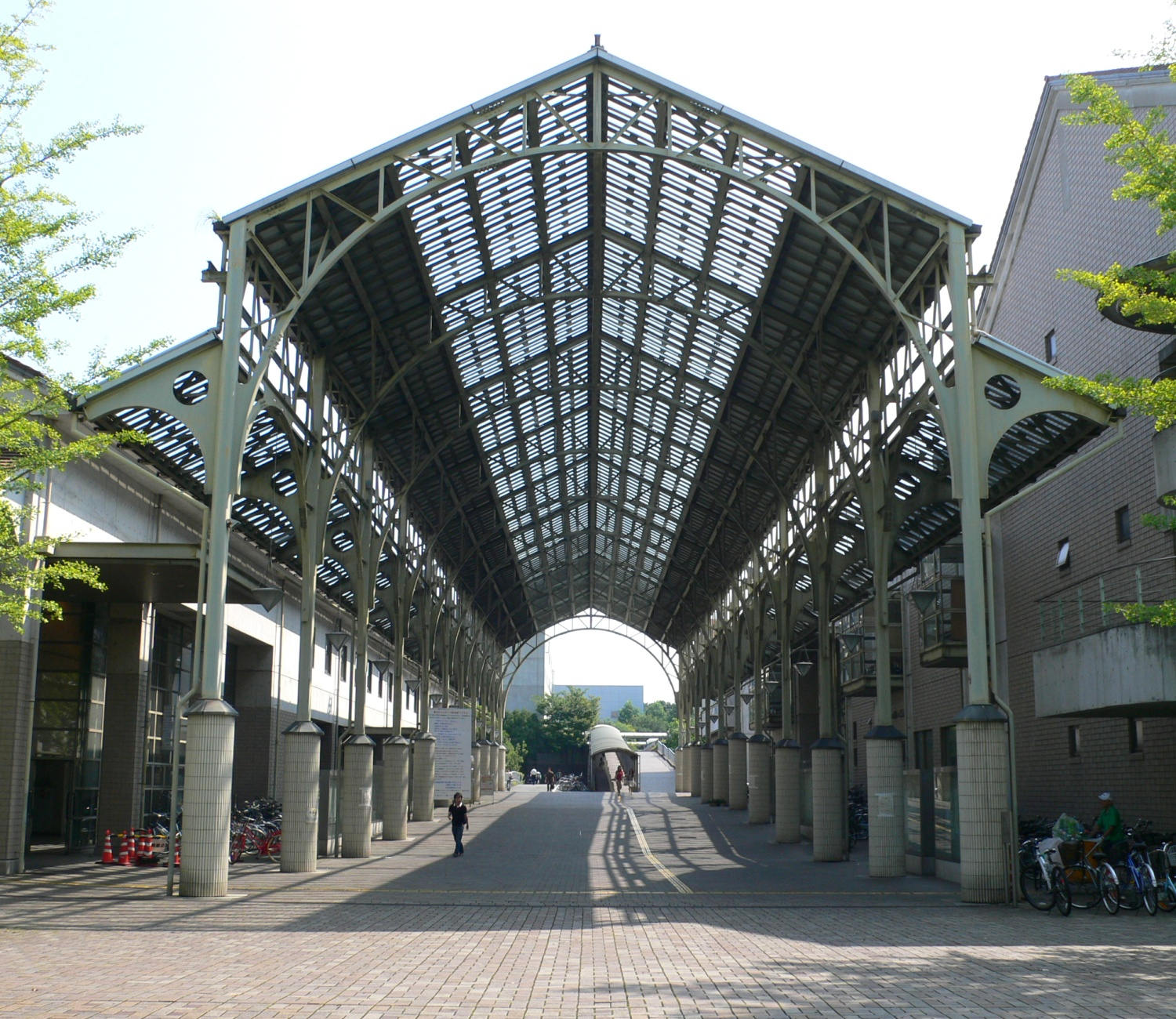
Information Centre

In 1932, Prefectural Higher School was relocated to 1–1–1 Yakumo, Meguro, and became known as one of the best higher schools with First Higher School. As the reign of Tokyo Metropolis was enacted in 1943, Prefectural Higher School was renamed to Metropolitan Higher School.

After the reform of the educational system in 1949, Tokyo Metropolitan University was established as a research university consisting of three faculties, namely Faculty of Humanities, Faculty of Science and Faculty of Technology; three years of advanced course was reorganized to Senior High School affiliated to Tokyo Metropolitan University, whereas four years of regular course was restructured into the university proper. Five Prefectural Colleges, namely Tokyo Prefectural College of Technology, Tokyo Prefectural College of Science, Tokyo Prefectural College of Machine Industry, Tokyo Prefectural College of Chemical Industry and Tokyo Prefectural College of Women were also merged with the Tokyo Metropolitan University. In 1957, Faculty of Law and Economics was separated from Faculty of Humanities, and then further divided into separate Faculty of Law and Faculty of Economics in 1966.

As expanding its organization, the university was relocated to 1–1–1 Minami-Osawa, Hachioji in 1991.

The university signed the student exchange agreement with University of Vienna in 1997.

Tokyo Metropolitan University was reformed in 2005 by integrating three metropolitan universities and one junior college: Tokyo Metropolitan University (東京都立大学, Tōkyō Toritsu Daigaku), Tokyo Metropolitan Institute of Technology (東京都立科学技術大学), Tokyo Metropolitan University of Health Sciences (東京都立保健科学大学), and Tokyo Metropolitan Junior College (東京都立短期大学) with subsequent change in its Japanese name, although its English name for the university has not changed since 1949.

== History ==
The following history includes the former institution of Tokyo Metropolitan University.

- 1949 – Tokyo Metropolitan University was established with three faculties, namely Humanities, Science and Technology
- 1953 – Master's courses of Anthropology, Social Science, Natural Science and Technology were set up
- 1955 – Doctoral courses of Anthropology, Social Science, Natural Science and Technology were set up
- 1957 – Faculty of Law and Economics was set up
- 1966 – Faculty of Law and Economics was reorganized as Faculty of Law and Faculty of Economics
- 1977 – Centre of Metropolitan Study was set up
- 1994 – Centre of Metropolitan Study was reorganised as Institute of Metropolitan Study
- 1996 – Master's course of Metropolitan Science was set up
- 1998 – Doctoral course of Metropolitan Science was set up
- 1991 – The campus was transferred from Meguro to Minami-Osawa
- 2003 – Institute of Social Science launched to provide MBA course (Business school)
- 2005 – Institute of Social Science launched to provide LLM course (Law school)
- 2005 – Tokyo Metropolitan University was reformed by integrating three metropolitan universities and one junior college, which consists of 4 faculties, 7 divisions with 21 courses as well as 6 graduate schools (the organization took over the former one) with 36 majors
- 2006 – Faculty of System Design opened the course of industrial art, and institutes were reorganized
- 2008 – Faculty of Urban Environment Sciences launched the course of nature- and culture-based tourism, and the Graduate School of Urban Environmental Sciences launched the major of tourism science
- 2009 – Faculty of Urban Liberal Arts launched the course of economics
- 2010 – Graduate School of System Design launched the major of industrial art
- 2011 – Tokyo Metropolitan University (former) was closed
- 2014 – Bangkok Office was set up in Bangkok, Thailand
- 2016 – Business School will be transferred from Shinjuku Satellite Campus to Marunouchi Satellite Campus with launching the course of Master of Finance

== University reform ==
In the later 1990s, Government and local municipalities facilitated to reform of the administrative scheme and financial management in line with economic bubble burst and financial difficulties due to Japan's progressive low birthrate and longevity. As a part of the said administrative and financial reform, social interest grew on restructuring national and public universities to independent administrative agencies with consolidating them. Tokyo Metropolitan University was also planned by the Tokyo Metropolitan Government to be consolidated with the aforementioned three metropolitan universities and one junior college.

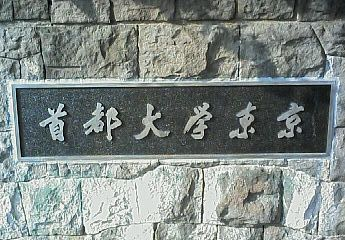
Name plate of the university before renaming

As a result of Tokyo gubernatorial election in April 2003, Shintaro Ishihara was re-elected as Governor of Tokyo, holding up a promise "I will establish a revolutionary university", and consequently the original restructuring plan was significantly and rapidly changed, in terms of the organization of faculties, course structure, etc. During this process, several faculty members left the university as a sign of protest against the reform.

== Faculties (undergraduate) ==
=== Faculty of Humanities and Social Sciences ===
- Department of Human and Social Sciences
  - Sociology
  - Social Anthropology
  - Social Welfare
  - Psychology
  - Pedagogy
  - Language Sciences
  - Japanese Language Education
- Department of Humanities
  - Philosophy
  - History and Archaeology
  - Studies of Culture and Representation
  - Japanese Cultures
  - Chinese Cultures
  - English Studies
  - German Studies
  - French Studies

=== Faculty of Law ===
- Department of Law
  - Division of Law
  - Division of Political Science

=== Faculty of Economics and Business Administration ===
- Department of Economics and Business Administration
  - Economics Program
  - Business Administration Program

=== Faculty of Science ===
- Department of Mathematical Science
- Department of Physics
- Department of Chemistry
- Department of Biological Sciences

=== Faculty of Urban Environmental Sciences ===
- Department of Geography
- Department of Civil and Environmental Engineering
- Department of Architecture
- Department of Applied Chemistry for Environment
- Department of Tourism Science
- Department of Urban Science and Policy

=== Faculty of Systems Design ===
- Department of Computer Science
- Department of Electrical Engineering and Computer Science
- Department of Mechanical Systems Engineering
- Department of Aeronautics and Astronautics
- Department of Industrial Art

=== Faculty of Health Sciences ===
- Department of Nursing Sciences
- Department of Physical Therapy
- Department of Occupational Therapy
- Department of Radiological Sciences

== Graduate schools ==
=== Graduate School of Humanities ===
- Department of Behavioral Social Sciences
  - Sociology
  - Social Anthropology
  - Social Welfare
- Department of Human Sciences
  - Psychology
  - Clinical Psychology
  - Pedagogy
  - Language Sciences
  - Japanese Language Education
- Department of Philosophy, History and Cultural Studies
  - Philosophy
    - Philosophy
    - Classical Studies
  - History
  - Studies of Culture and Representation
- Department of Intercultural Studies
  - Intercultural Studies of Japanese and Asia
    - Japanese
    - Chinese
  - Intercultural Studies of European and American
    - English
    - German
    - French

=== Graduate School of Law and Politics ===
- Department of Law and Politics
  - Division of Law
  - Division of Political Science
- Law School
  - 2-year curriculum
  - 3-year curriculum

=== Graduate School of Management ===
- Department of Management
  - Business Administration (MBA) Program
  - Economics (MEc) Program
  - Finance (MF) Program

=== Graduate School of Science ===
- Department of Mathematical Sciences
- Department of Physics
- Department of Chemistry
- Department of Biological Sciences

=== Graduate School of Urban Environmental Sciences ===
- Department of Geography
- Department of Civil and Environmental Engineering
- Department of Architecture and Building Engineering
- Department of Applied Chemistry for Environment
- Department of Tourism Science
- Department of Urban Science and Policy

=== Graduate School of Systems Design ===
- Department of Computer Science
- Department of Electrical Engineering and Computer Science
- Department of Mechanical Systems Engineering
- Department of Aeronautics and Astronautics
- Department of Industrial Art

=== Graduate School of Human Health Sciences ===
- Department of Nursing Sciences
- Department of Physical Therapy
- Department of Occupational Therapy
- Department of Radiological Sciences
- Department of Frontier Health Sciences
- Department of Health Promotion Sciences

== Campuses ==
- Minami-Osawa Campus (Main campus)
- Hino Campus (Faculty of System Design and Graduate School of System Design)
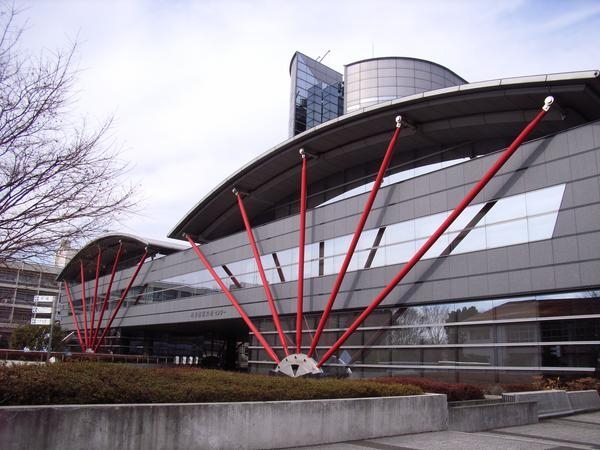
  Hino campus
- Arakawa Campus (Faculty of Health Sciences and Graduate School of Human Health Sciences)
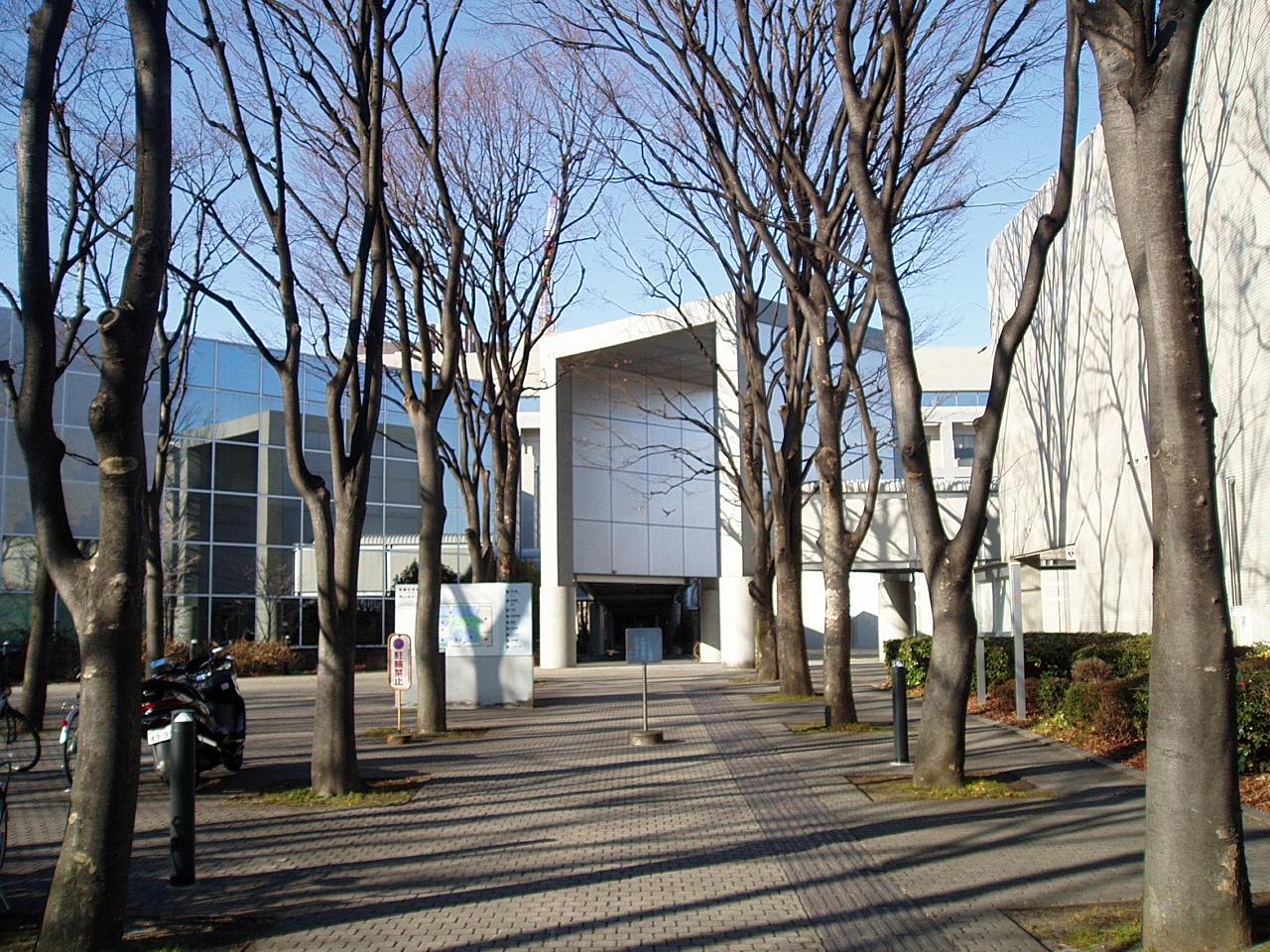
  Arakawa campus
- Harumi Campus (Law School)
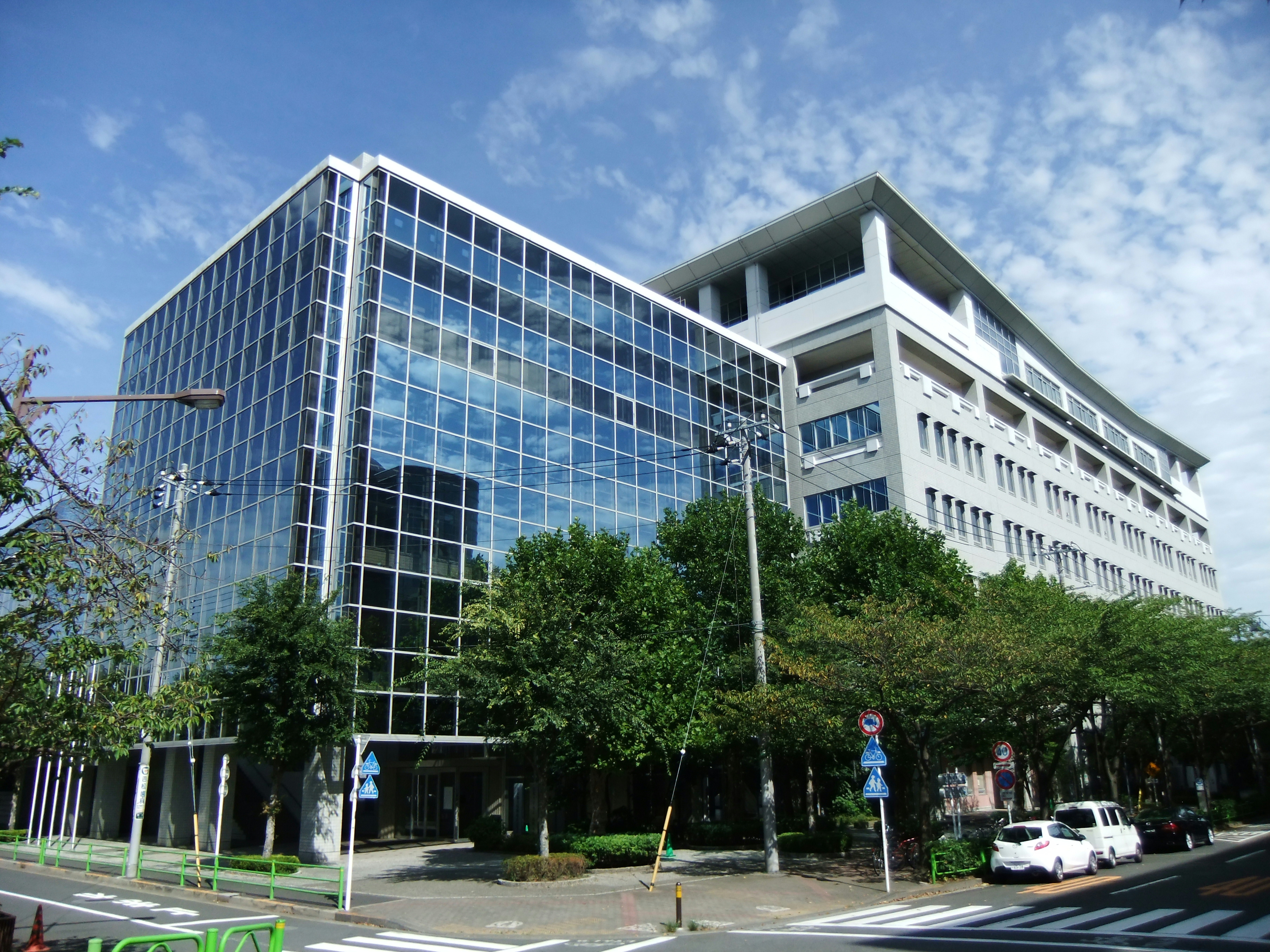
  Harumi campus
- Marunouchi Satellite Campus (Business School)

== Facilities ==
- Computer Centre and Information Processing Facilities
- Science and Technology Research Facilities
- The Makino Herbarium
- International House
- Ogasawara Field Research Station
- External Facility in Fujimi-kogen Highlands (two-story log-house)
- Bangkok Office

== Research centres ==
Lecturers of the university have been all highly regarded in their respective fields, and the standard of the research carried out by each of them has been considered extremely high. In line with this, research groups that produce outstanding results and have the potential to become international research hubs, or those working in unique fields that are aligned with the university's mission, are designated as "research centers" and given support by the university.

- Research Centre for Space Science (Director: Prof. Takaya Ohashi)
- Research Centre for Genomics and Bioinformatics (Director: Prof. Koichiro Tamura)
- Research Centre for Artificial Photosynthesis (Director: Prof. Haruo Inoue)
- Research Centre for Gold Chemistry (Director: Prof. Masatake Haruta)
- Research Centre for Language, Brain, and Genetics (Director: Prof. Hiroko Hagiwara)
- Research Centre for Water System Engineering (Director: Prof. Akira Koizumi)
- Research Centre for Community Centric Systems (Director: Prof .Toru Yamaguchi)
- Research Centre for Child and Adolescent Poverty Overview (Director: Prof. Aya Abe)

== International partner institutions ==
The university has concluded agreements with overseas educational institutions to promote international cooperation in education and research as well as student exchange.

=== Asia ===
China

- Capital Normal University
- Jilin University
- Northeastern University
- South China University of Technology

India

- IIT Kharagpur

Indonesia

- BINUS University
- University of Indonesia

Malaysia

- University Kebangsaan Malaysia
- Universiti Putra Malaysia
- Universiti Teknologi Malaysia
- University of Malaya

South Korea

- Chung-Ang University
- Hanyang University
- Incheon National University
- Chonnam National University
- University of Seoul

Taiwan

- National Dong Hwa University
- National Taiwan Normal University
- National Tsing Hua University

Thailand

- Chulalongkorn University
- King Mongkut's University of Technology Thonburi
- Mahidol University
- Thammasat University

Vietnam

- Hue University
- Thuyloi University

Turkey

- Sabanci University

Australia

- Royal Melbourne Institute of Technology
- Edith Cowan University
- Macquarie University
- Institute of Continuing & TESOL Education, University of Queensland
- University of Western Sydney
- University of Wollongong
- The University of Newcastle

=== North America ===
Canada

- Royal Roads University
- University of Waterloo
- The University of Western Ontario
- Memorial University of Newfoundland
- University of Manitoba
- Saint Mary's University
- University of Regina

United States of America

- Murray State University
- Eastern Washington University
- University of California, Riverside, Extension
- University of Wisconsin-Green Bay
- Georgia Institute of Technology

=== Europe ===
Finland

- University of Jyväskylä

Sweden

- Umeå University

Norway

- Buskerud and Vestfold University College

(Republic of Ireland) Ireland

- University College Cork

United Kingdom

- Oxford Brookes University
- The School of Oriental and African Studies, University of London
- Bangor University
- University of Hull
- University of Leicester
- University of Birmingham
- University of York
- University of Nottingham
- University of Aberdeen
- Northumbria University
- Keele University
- University of Portsmouth

Netherlands

- Rotterdam University of Applied Sciences

Germany

- Fachhochschule Kaiserslautern – University of Applied Sciences
- Koblenz University of Applied Science
- University of Bayreuth

France

- Lille 1 University
- Paris-South 11 University
- Rennes 2 University
- The International Organization for Research and Education on Mechatronics

Spain

- Cardenal Cisneros University College, Alcala University
- The University of Alcala
- University of A Coruña

Italy

- The Politecnico di Milano
- University of Basilicata
- Sapienza University of Rome
- The University of Rome "Tor Vergata"

Austria

- The University of Vienna

Poland

- AGH University of Science and Technology
- University of Wroclaw

Hungary

- Óbuda University

Bulgaria

- Technical University of Sofia

Russia

- Tomsk State University
- Tomsk Polytechnic University

Lithuania

- Siauliai University

== Notable alumni ==
- Masataka Banno (坂野 正高 Banno Masataka)
- Yukihiko Yaguchi, Japanese automotive engineer

== Academic reputation ==
University rankings

Global – Overall
- QS World: 1001–1200
- THE World: 1201–1500

Regional – Overall
- QS Asia: =240 (2025)
- THE Asia: 33

Although it is small in size and young history in contrast to national universities and several leading private universities, the university has been one of the most reputable institutions in Japan. According to the Times Higher Education World University Rankings, it ranks 7th in 2014–2015 among 781 universities in Japan, behind renowned national universities, namely University of Tokyo, Kyoto University, Tokyo Institute of Technology, Osaka University, Tohoku University and Nagoya University. The university received the highest score of 100.0 for "citations.”

In 2012, Prof. Masatake Haruta was selected as a Thomson Reuters Citation Laureate as a possible winner of the Nobel Prize for his "independent foundational discoveries of catalysis by gold."
