= Bracket (disambiguation) =

A bracket is a tall punctuation mark typically used in matched pairs within text.

Bracket may also refer to:

== Architecture and engineering ==
- Bracket (architecture), an architectural element, a structural or decorative member
  - Corbel or decorative bracket, used in furniture and mantelpieces
- Bracket, a general term for an object used for support
  - Automotive bracket, various brackets used in List of auto parts
  - Angle bracket, a type of fastener to join two parts
  - Bottom bracket, in bicycles
  - Blade bracket, in ceiling fans
  - Bracket, a component of dental braces

== Entertainment ==
- Bracket (band), a pop punk band
- "The Bracket", an episode of television series How I Met Your Mother
- ( ) (film), a 2003 film directed by Morgan Fisher
- ( ) (album), an album by the Icelandic band Sigur Rós
- Bracket (music group), a Nigerian afropop music group

== Mathematics and science ==
- Bracket fungus, fungi in the phylum Basidiomycota
- Bracket (mathematics), symbols used to specify the order of operations
- Curly-bracket languages, in programming
- Lie bracket of vector fields, multiple meanings
- Poisson bracket, an operator used in mathematics and physics
- Bra–ket notation, a notation for describing quantum states in the theory of quantum mechanics
- Frölicher–Nijenhuis bracket, an extension of the Lie bracket of vector fields
- Moyal bracket, in physics
- Nijenhuis–Richardson bracket or algebraic bracket
- Schouten–Nijenhuis bracket, in differential geometry

== Other uses ==
- Brackets (text editor), an open-source HTML editor
- Bracket, in typeface anatomy, the curve connecting a serif to the main stroke
- Bracket (tournament), a diagrammatic representation of the series of games played during a tournament
  - March Madness pools, known as brackets, predicting the outcome of the NCAA Division I men's basketball tournament
- Bracket turn, a figure skating move

== See also ==
- Tax bracket (or income bracket)
- Bracket clock
- Bracketing (disambiguation)
  - Bracketing, the photographic technique of taking multiple shots of the same subject with different camera-settings
  - Bracketing (phenomenology), suspension of judgment as to the answer of a question, and proceed as if there were some answer
- Parenthesis (disambiguation)
