= Bracket (mathematics) =

Brackets as used in mathematical notation

In mathematics, brackets of various typographical forms, such as parentheses ( ), square brackets [ ], braces { } and angle brackets ⟨ ⟩, are frequently used in mathematical notation. Generally, such bracketing denotes some form of grouping: in evaluating an expression containing a bracketed sub-expression, the operators in the sub-expression take precedence over those surrounding it. Sometimes, for the clarity of reading, different kinds of brackets are used to express the same meaning of precedence in a single expression with deep nesting of sub-expressions.

Historically, other notations, such as the vinculum, were similarly used for grouping. In present-day use, these notations all have specific meanings. The earliest use of brackets to indicate aggregation (i.e. grouping) was suggested in 1608 by Christopher Clavius, and in 1629 by Albert Girard.

== Symbols for representing angle brackets ==
A variety of different symbols are used to represent angle brackets. In e-mail and other ASCII text, it is common to use the less-than (<) and greater-than (>) signs to represent angle brackets, because ASCII does not include angle brackets.

Unicode has pairs of dedicated characters; other than less-than and greater-than symbols, these include:

- U+27E8 ⟨ MATHEMATICAL LEFT ANGLE BRACKET and U+27E9 ⟩ MATHEMATICAL RIGHT ANGLE BRACKET
- U+29FC ⧼ LEFT-POINTING CURVED ANGLE BRACKET and U+29FD ⧽ RIGHT-POINTING CURVED ANGLE BRACKET
- U+2991 ⦑ LEFT ANGLE BRACKET WITH DOT and U+2992 ⦒ RIGHT ANGLE BRACKET WITH DOT
- U+27EA ⟪ MATHEMATICAL LEFT DOUBLE ANGLE BRACKET and U+27EB ⟫ MATHEMATICAL RIGHT DOUBLE ANGLE BRACKET
- U+2329 〈 LEFT-POINTING ANGLE BRACKET and U+232A 〉 RIGHT-POINTING ANGLE BRACKET, which are deprecated

In LaTeX the markup is \langle and \rangle: $\langle\ \rangle$.

Non-mathematical angled brackets include:

- U+3008 〈 LEFT ANGLE BRACKET and U+3009 〉 RIGHT ANGLE BRACKET, used in East-Asian text quotation
- U+276C ❬ MEDIUM LEFT-POINTING ANGLE BRACKET ORNAMENT and U+276D ❭ MEDIUM RIGHT-POINTING ANGLE BRACKET ORNAMENT, which are dingbats

There are additional dingbats with increased line thickness, a lot of angle quotation marks and deprecated characters.

== Algebra ==
In elementary algebra, parentheses ( ) are used to specify the order of operations. Terms inside the bracket are evaluated first; hence 2×(3 + 4) is 14, 20 ÷ (5(1 + 1)) is 2 and (2×3) + 4 is 10. This notation is extended to cover more general algebra involving variables: for example (x + y) × (x − y). Square brackets are also often used in place of a second set of parentheses when they are nested—so as to provide a visual distinction.

In mathematical expressions in general, parentheses are also used to indicate grouping (i.e., which parts belong together) when edible to avoid ambiguities and improve clarity. For example, in the formula $(\varepsilon \eta)_X = \varepsilon_{Cod \, \eta_X}\eta_X$, used in the definition of composition of two natural transformations, the parentheses around $\varepsilon \eta$ serve to indicate that the indexing by $X$ is applied to the composition $\varepsilon \eta$, and not just its last component $\eta$.

== Functions ==
The arguments to a function are frequently surrounded by brackets: $f(x)$. With some standard function when there is little chance of ambiguity, it is common to omit the parentheses around the argument altogether (e.g., $\sin x$). Note that this is never done with a general function $f$, in which case the parenthesis are always included

== Coordinates and vectors ==
In the Cartesian coordinate system, brackets are used to specify the coordinates of a point. For example, (2,3) denotes the point with x-coordinate 2 and y-coordinate 3.

The inner product of two vectors is commonly written as $\langle a, b\rangle$, but the notation (a, b) is also used.

== Intervals ==
Both parentheses, ( ), and square brackets, [ ], can also be used to denote an interval. The notation $[a, c)$ is used to indicate an interval from a to c that is inclusive of $a$—but exclusive of $c$. That is, $[5, 12)$ would be the set of all real numbers between 5 and 12, including 5 but not 12. Here, the numbers may come as close as they like to 12, including 11.999 and so forth (with any finite number of 9s), but 12.0 is not included.

In some European countries, the notation $[5,12[$ is also used for this, and wherever comma is used as decimal separator, semicolon might be used as a separator to avoid ambiguity (e.g., $(0 ; 1)$).

The endpoint adjoining the square bracket is known as closed, while the endpoint adjoining the parenthesis is known as open. If both types of brackets are the same, the entire interval may be referred to as closed or open as appropriate. Whenever infinity or negative infinity is used as an endpoint (in the case of intervals on the real number line), it is always considered open and adjoined to a parenthesis. The endpoint can be closed when considering intervals on the extended real number line.

A common convention in discrete mathematics is to define $[n]$ as the set of positive integer numbers less or equal than $n$. That is, $[5]$ would correspond to the set $\{1,2,3,4,5\}$.

== Sets and groups ==
Braces { } are used to identify the elements of a set. For example, {a,b,c} denotes a set of three elements a, b and c.

Angle brackets ⟨ ⟩ are used in group theory and commutative algebra to specify group presentations, and to denote the subgroup or ideal generated by a collection of elements.

== Matrices ==
An explicitly given matrix is commonly written between large round or square brackets:

$$\begin{pmatrix}
1 & -1 \\
2 & 3 \end{pmatrix}
\quad\quad\begin{bmatrix}
c & d \end{bmatrix}$$

== Derivatives ==
The notation
$$f^{(n)}(x)$$
stands for the n-th derivative of function f, applied to argument x. So, for example, if $f(x) = \exp(\lambda x)$, then $f^{(n)}(x) = \lambda^n\exp(\lambda x)$. This is to be contrasted with $f^n(x) = f(f(\ldots(f(x))\ldots))$, the n-fold application of f to argument x.

== Falling and rising factorial ==
The notation $(x)_n$ is used to denote the falling factorial, an n-th degree polynomial defined by
$$(x)_n=x(x-1)(x-2)\cdots(x-n+1)=\frac{x!}{(x-n)!}.$$

Alternatively, the same notation may be encountered as representing the rising factorial, also called "Pochhammer symbol". Another notation for the same is $x^{(n)}$. It can be defined by
$$x^{(n)}=x(x+1)(x+2)\cdots(x+n-1)=\frac{(x+n-1)!}{(x-1)!}.$$

== Quantum mechanics ==
In quantum mechanics, angle brackets are also used as part of Dirac's formalism, bra–ket notation, to denote vectors from the dual spaces of the bra $\left\langle A\right|$ and the ket $\left|B\right\rangle$.

In statistical mechanics, angle brackets denote ensemble or time average.

== Polynomial rings ==
Square brackets are used to contain the variable(s) in polynomial rings. For example, $\mathbb{R}[x]$ is the ring of polynomials with real number coefficients and variable $x$.

== Subring generated by an element or collection of elements ==
If A is a subring of a ring B, and b is an element of B, then A[b] denotes the subring of B generated by A and b. This subring consists of all the elements that can be obtained, starting from the elements of A and b, by repeated addition and multiplication; equivalently, it is the smallest subring of B that contains A and b. For example, $\mathbf{Z}[\sqrt{-2}]$ is the smallest subring of C containing all the integers and $\sqrt{-2}$; it consists of all numbers of the form $m+n\sqrt{-2}$, where m and n are arbitrary integers. Another example: $\mathbf{Z}[1/2]$ is the subring of Q consisting of all rational numbers whose denominator is a power of 2.

More generally, if A is a subring of a ring B, and $b_1,\ldots,b_n \in B$, then $A[b_1,\ldots,b_n]$ denotes the subring of B generated by A and $b_1,\ldots,b_n \in B$. Even more generally, if S is a subset of B, then A[S] is the subring of B generated by A and S.

== Lie bracket and commutator ==
In group theory and ring theory, square brackets are used to denote the commutator. In group theory, the commutator [g,h] is commonly defined as g^{−1}h^{−1}gh. In ring theory, the commutator [a,b] is defined as ab − ba. Furthermore, braces may be used to denote the anticommutator: {a,b} is defined as ab + ba.

The Lie bracket of a Lie algebra is a binary operation denoted by $[\cdot,\cdot]:\mathfrak{g}\times\mathfrak{g}\to\mathfrak{g}$. By using the commutator as a Lie bracket, every associative algebra can be turned into a Lie algebra. There are many different forms of Lie bracket, in particular the Lie derivative and the Jacobi–Lie bracket.

== Floor/ceiling functions and fractional part ==
The floor and ceiling functions are usually typeset with left and right square brackets where only the lower (for floor function) or upper (for ceiling function) horizontal bars are displayed, as in ⌊π⌋ = 3 or ⌈π⌉ = 4. However, Square brackets, as in [π] = 3, are sometimes used to denote the floor function, which rounds a real number down to the next integer. Conversely, some authors use outwards pointing square brackets to denote the ceiling function, as in ]π[ = 4.

Braces, as in {π} < ^{1}/_{7}, may denote the fractional part of a real number.

== See also ==
- Binomial coefficient
- Bracket polynomial
- Bra-ket notation
- Delimiter
- Dyck language
- Frölicher–Nijenhuis bracket
- Iverson bracket
- Nijenhuis–Richardson bracket, also known as algebraic bracket.
- Pochhammer symbol
- Poisson bracket
- Schouten–Nijenhuis bracket
- System of equations
