= Nijenhuis bracket =

In mathematics there are four different but related brackets named after Albert Nijenhuis, giving Lie superalgebra structures to various spaces of tensors:

- Frölicher–Nijenhuis bracket (defined on vector valued forms, extending the Lie bracket of vector fields)
- Nijenhuis–Richardson bracket (defined on vector valued forms; this has a different degree to the Frölicher-Nijenhuis bracket)
- Schouten–Nijenhuis bracket (2 versions, defined on either symmetric or antisymmetric multivectors)
