= Inner derivation =

Inner derivation may refer to:

- The graded derivation defined by the interior product
- Derivation (differential algebra) § Inner derivations, commutators with a fixed element of an algebra
