= Parenthesis (disambiguation) =

A parenthesis (plural parentheses) is a type of bracket used for punctuation.

It may also refer to:

- Parenthesis (rhetoric), an explanatory or qualifying word in a passage or statement.
- In Parenthesis, an epic poem of World War 1 by David Jones.
- Emphasis! (On Parenthesis), an album by the Stanton Moore Trio.
- Lecithocera parenthesis, a moth in the family Lecithoceridae.
- Triple parentheses (also known as an (((echo)))) are a symbol used to highlight the names of individuals of a Jewish background.

== See also ==
- Bracket (disambiguation)
- Math symbol parentheses (disambiguation)
- ( ) (disambiguation)
