= Schouten–Nijenhuis bracket =

In differential geometry, the Schouten–Nijenhuis bracket, also known as the Schouten bracket, is a type of graded Lie bracket defined on multivector fields on a smooth manifold extending the Lie bracket of vector fields.

There are two different versions, both rather confusingly called by the same name. The most common version is defined on alternating multivector fields and makes them into a Gerstenhaber algebra, but there is also another version defined on symmetric multivector fields, which is more or less the same as the Poisson bracket on the cotangent bundle. It was invented by Jan Arnoldus Schouten (1940, 1953) and its properties were investigated by his student Albert Nijenhuis (1955). It is related to but not the same as the Nijenhuis–Richardson bracket and the Frölicher–Nijenhuis bracket.

== Definition and properties ==
An alternating multivector field is a section of the exterior algebra $\wedge^\bullet TM$ over the tangent bundle of a manifold $M$. The alternating multivector fields form a graded supercommutative ring with the product of $a$ and $b$ written as $ab$ (some authors use $a \wedge b$). This is dual to the usual algebra of differential forms $\Omega^\bullet (M)$ by the pairing on homogeneous elements:

$$\omega(a_1a_2 \dots a_p)=\left\{
\begin{matrix}
\omega(a_1,\dots,a_p)&(\omega\in \Omega^pM)\\
0&(\omega\not\in\Omega^pM)
\end{matrix}\right.$$

The degree of a multivector $A$ in $\Lambda^p TM$ is defined to be $|A|=p$.

The skew symmetric Schouten–Nijenhuis bracket is the unique extension of the Lie bracket of vector fields to a graded bracket on the space of alternating multivector fields that makes the alternating multivector fields into a Gerstenhaber algebra. It is given in terms of the Lie bracket of vector fields by

$$[a_1\cdots a_m,b_1\cdots b_n]=\sum_{i,j}(-1)^{i+j}[a_i,b_j]a_1\cdots a_{i-1}a_{i+1}\cdots a_mb_1\cdots b_{j-1}b_{j+1}\cdots b_n$$

for vector fields $a_i$, $b_j$ and

$$[f,a_1\cdots a_m] = -\iota_{df}(a_1 \cdots a_m)$$

for vector fields $a_i$ and smooth function $f$, where $\iota_{df}$ is the common interior product operator. It has the following properties.

- $(ab)c=a(bc)$ (the product is associative);
- $ab = (-1)^{|a||b|} ba$ (the product is (super) commutative);
- $|ab| = |a|+|b|$ (the product has degree 0);
- $|[a,b]|=|a|+|b|-1$ (the Schouten–Nijenhuis bracket has degree −1);
- $[a,bc] = [a,b]c + (-1)^{|b| (|a|-1) } b [a,c]$ (Poisson identity);
- $[a,b] = - (-1)^{(|a| -1) (|b| -1)} [b,a]$ (antisymmetry of Schouten–Nijenhuis bracket);
- $[[a,b],c] = [a,[b,c]] - (-1)^{(|a|-1) (|b|-1) } [b,[a,c]]$ (Jacobi identity for Schouten–Nijenhuis bracket);
- If $f$ and $g$ are functions (multivectors homogeneous of degree 0), then $[f,g]=0$;
- If $a$ is a vector field, then $[a,b] = L_a b$ is the usual Lie derivative of the multivector field $b$ along $a$, and in particular if $a$ and $b$ are vector fields then the Schouten–Nijenhuis bracket is the usual Lie bracket of vector fields.

The Schouten–Nijenhuis bracket makes the multivector fields into a Lie superalgebra if the grading is changed to the one of opposite parity (so that the even and odd subspaces are switched), though with this new grading it is no longer a supercommutative ring. Accordingly, the Jacobi identity may also be expressed in the symmetrical form

$$(-1)^{(|a|-1)(|c|-1)}[a,[b,c]]+(-1)^{(|b|-1)(|a|-1)}[b,[c,a]]+(-1)^{(|c|-1)(|b|-1)}[c,[a,b]] = 0.\,$$

== Generalizations ==
There is a common generalization of the Schouten–Nijenhuis bracket for alternating multivector fields and the Frölicher–Nijenhuis bracket due to Vinogradov (1990).

A version of the Schouten–Nijenhuis bracket can also be defined for symmetric multivector fields in a similar way. The symmetric multivector fields can be identified with functions on the cotangent space $T^*M$ of $M$ that are polynomial in the fiber, and under this identification the symmetric Schouten–Nijenhuis bracket corresponds to the Poisson bracket of functions on the symplectic manifold $T^*M$. There is a common generalization of the Schouten–Nijenhuis bracket for symmetric multivector fields and the Frölicher–Nijenhuis bracket due to Dubois-Violette and Peter W. Michor (1995).
