= Hasse derivative =

Mathematical concept

In mathematics, the Hasse derivative is a generalisation of the derivative which allows the formulation of Taylor's theorem in coordinate rings of algebraic varieties.

== Definition ==
Let k[X] be a polynomial ring over a field k. The r-th Hasse derivative of X^{n} is

$$D^{(r)} X^n = \binom{n}{r} X^{n-r},$$

if n ≥ r and zero otherwise. In characteristic zero we have

$$D^{(r)} = \frac{1}{r!} \left(\frac{\mathrm{d}}{\mathrm{d}X}\right)^r \ .$$

== Properties ==
The Hasse derivative is a generalized derivation on k[X] and extends to a generalized derivation on the function field k(X), satisfying an analogue of the product rule

$$D^{(r)}(fg) = \sum_{i=0}^r D^{(i)}(f) D^{(r-i)}(g)$$

and an analogue of the chain rule. Note that the $D^{(r)}$ are not themselves derivations in general, but are closely related.

A form of Taylor's theorem holds for a function f defined in terms of a local parameter t on an algebraic variety:

$$f = \sum_r D^{(r)}(f) \cdot t^r \ .$$
