= Graded Lie algebra =

In mathematics, a graded Lie algebra is a Lie algebra endowed with a gradation which is compatible with the Lie bracket. In other words, a graded Lie algebra is a Lie algebra which is also a nonassociative graded algebra under the bracket operation. A choice of Cartan decomposition endows any semisimple Lie algebra with the structure of a graded Lie algebra. Any parabolic Lie algebra is also a graded Lie algebra.

A graded Lie superalgebra extends the notion of a graded Lie algebra in such a way that the Lie bracket is no longer assumed to be necessarily anticommutative. These arise in the study of derivations on graded algebras, in the deformation theory of Murray Gerstenhaber, Kunihiko Kodaira, and Donald C. Spencer, and in the theory of Lie derivatives.

A supergraded Lie superalgebra is a further generalization of this notion to the category of superalgebras in which a graded Lie superalgebra is endowed with an additional super $\Z/2\Z$-gradation. These arise when one forms a graded Lie superalgebra in a classical (non-supersymmetric) setting, and then tensorizes to obtain the supersymmetric analog.

Still greater generalizations are possible to Lie algebras over a class of braided monoidal categories equipped with a coproduct and some notion of a gradation compatible with the braiding in the category. For hints in this direction, see Lie superalgebra#Category-theoretic definition.

== Graded Lie algebras ==
In its most basic form, a graded Lie algebra is an ordinary Lie algebra $\mathfrak g$, together with a gradation of vector spaces

$${\mathfrak g}=\bigoplus_{i\in{\Z}} {\mathfrak g}_i,$$

such that the Lie bracket respects this gradation:

$$[{\mathfrak g}_i,{\mathfrak g}_j]\subseteq {\mathfrak g}_{i+j}.$$

The universal enveloping algebra of a graded Lie algebra inherits the grading.

=== Examples ===
==== sl(2) ====
For example, the Lie algebra $\mathfrak{sl}(2)$ of trace-free 2 × 2 matrices is graded by the generators:

$$X = \begin{pmatrix}0&1\\0&0\end{pmatrix},\quad
Y = \begin{pmatrix}0&0\\1&0\end{pmatrix},\quad\textrm{and}\quad
H = \begin{pmatrix}1&0\\0&-1\end{pmatrix}.$$

These satisfy the relations $[X,Y] = H$, $[H,X] = 2X$, and $[H,Y] = -2Y$. Hence with $\mathfrak{g}_{-1} = \textrm{span}(X)$, $\mathfrak{g}_{0} = \textrm{span}(H)$, and $\mathfrak{g}_{1} = \textrm{span}(Y)$, the decomposition $\mathfrak{sl}(2) = \mathfrak{g}_{-1} \oplus \mathfrak{g}_0 \oplus \mathfrak{g}_{1}$ presents $\mathfrak{sl}(2)$ as a graded Lie algebra.

==== Free Lie algebra ====
The free Lie algebra on a set X naturally has a grading, given by the minimum number of terms needed to generate the group element. This arises for example as the associated graded Lie algebra to the lower central series of a free group.

=== Generalizations ===
If $\Gamma$ is any commutative monoid, then the notion of a $\Gamma$-graded Lie algebra generalizes that of an ordinary ($\Z$-) graded Lie algebra so that the defining relations hold with the integers $\Z$ replaced by $\Gamma$. In particular, any semisimple Lie algebra is graded by the root spaces of its adjoint representation.

== Graded Lie superalgebras ==
A graded Lie superalgebra over a field k (not of characteristic 2) consists of a graded vector space E over k, along with a bilinear bracket operation

$$[-,-] : E \otimes_k E \to E$$

such that the following axioms are satisfied.

- [-, -] respects the gradation of E:
  $$[E_i,E_j]\subseteq E_{i+j}.$$
- (Symmetry) For all x in E_{i} and y in E_{j},
  $$[x,y]=-(-1)^{ij}\,[y,x]$$
- (Jacobi identity) For all x in E_{i}, y in E_{j}, and z in E_{k},
  $$(-1)^{ik}[x,[y,z]]+(-1)^{ij}[y,[z,x]]+(-1)^{jk}[z,[x,y]]=0.$$
  (If k has characteristic 3, then the Jacobi identity must be supplemented with the condition $[x,[x,x]] = 0$ for all x in E_{odd}.)

Note, for instance, that when E carries the trivial gradation, a graded Lie superalgebra over k is just an ordinary Lie algebra. When the gradation of E is concentrated in even degrees, one recovers the definition of a (Z-)graded Lie algebra.

=== Examples and Applications ===
The most basic example of a graded Lie superalgebra occurs in the study of derivations of graded algebras. If A is a graded k-algebra with gradation

$$A = \bigoplus_{i\in\Z} A_i,$$

then a graded k-derivation d on A of degree l is defined by

1. $dx= 0$ for $x\in k$,
2. $d\colon A_i \to A_{i+l}$, and
3. $d(xy) = (dx)y+(-1)^{il}x(dy)$ for $x\in A_i$.

The space of all graded derivations of degree l is denoted by $\operatorname{Der}_l(A)$, and the direct sum of these spaces,

$$\operatorname{Der}(A) = \bigoplus_l \operatorname{Der}_l(A),$$

carries the structure of an A-module. This generalizes the notion of a derivation of commutative algebras to the graded category.

On Der(A), one can define a bracket via:

[d, δ ] = dδ − (−1)^{ij}δd, for d ∈ Der_{i}(A) and δ ∈ Der_{j}(A).

Equipped with this structure, Der(A) inherits the structure of a graded Lie superalgebra over k.

Further examples:

- The Frölicher–Nijenhuis bracket is an example of a graded Lie algebra arising naturally in the study of connections in differential geometry.
- The Nijenhuis–Richardson bracket arises in connection with the deformations of Lie algebras.

=== Generalizations ===
The notion of a graded Lie superalgebra can be generalized so that their grading is not just the integers. Specifically, a signed semiring consists of a pair $(\Gamma, \epsilon)$, where $\Gamma$ is a semiring and $\epsilon \colon \Gamma \to \Z/2\Z$ is a homomorphism of additive groups. Then a graded Lie supalgebra over a signed semiring consists of a vector space E graded with respect to the additive structure on $\Gamma$, and a bilinear bracket [-, -] which respects the grading on E and in addition satisfies:

1. $[x,y] = - (-1)^{\epsilon(\deg x)\epsilon(\deg y)}[y,x]$ for all homogeneous elements x and y, and
2. $(-1)^{\epsilon(\deg x)\epsilon(\deg z)}[x,[y,z]] + (-1)^{\epsilon(\deg y)\epsilon(\deg x)}[y,[z,x]] + (-1)^{\epsilon(\deg z)\epsilon(\deg y)}[z,[x,y]]=0.$

Further examples:

- A Lie superalgebra is a graded Lie superalgebra over the signed semiring $(\Z/2\Z, \epsilon)$, where $\epsilon$ is the identity map for the additive structure on the ring $\Z/2\Z$.

== See also ==
- Differential graded Lie algebra
- Graded (mathematics)
- Lie algebra-valued form
