= Lie derivative =

Type of derivative in differential geometry

In differential geometry, the Lie derivative (/liː/ LEE), formulated by Władysław Ślebodziński and named after Sophus Lie, evaluates the change of a tensor field (including scalar functions, vector fields and one-forms), along the flow defined by another vector field. This change is coordinate invariant and therefore the Lie derivative is defined on any differentiable manifold.

Functions, tensor fields and forms can be differentiated with respect to a vector field. If T is a tensor field and X is a vector field, then the Lie derivative of T with respect to X is denoted $\mathcal{L}_X T$. The differential operator $T \mapsto \mathcal{L}_X T$ is a derivation of the algebra of tensor fields of the underlying manifold.

The Lie derivative commutes with contraction and the exterior derivative on differential forms.

Although there are many concepts of taking a derivative in differential geometry, they all agree when the expression being differentiated is a function or scalar field. Thus in this case the word "Lie" is dropped, and one simply speaks of the derivative of a function.

The Lie derivative of a vector field Y with respect to another vector field X is known as the "Lie bracket" of X and Y, and is often denoted $[X,Y]$ instead of $\mathcal{L}_X Y$. The space of vector fields forms a Lie algebra with respect to this Lie bracket. The Lie derivative constitutes an infinite-dimensional Lie algebra representation of this Lie algebra, due to the identity

$$\mathcal{L}_{[X,Y]} T = \mathcal{L}_X \mathcal{L}_{Y} T - \mathcal{L}_Y \mathcal{L}_X T,$$

Proof of the identity
:$\mathcal{L}_{[X,Y]} T = [[X,Y],T] = [X,Y]T - T[X,Y] = ([X,YT] - Y[X,T]) - ([X,TY] - [X,T]Y) =$

$$= XYT - YTX - Y[X,T] - XTY + TYX + [X,T]Y = (XYT - YTX) + (TYX - XTY) - (Y[X,T] - [X,T]Y) =$$
$$= (X[Y,T] + [T,Y]X) - (Y[X,T] - [X,T]Y) = (X[Y,T] - [Y,T]X) - (Y[X,T] - [X,T]Y) =$$
$$= [X,[Y,T]] - [Y,[X,T]] = \mathcal{L}_X \mathcal{L}_{Y} T - \mathcal{L}_Y \mathcal{L}_X T$$

valid for any vector fields X and Y and any tensor field T.

Considering vector fields as infinitesimal generators of flows (i.e. one-dimensional groups of diffeomorphisms) on M, the Lie derivative is the differential of the representation of the diffeomorphism group on tensor fields, analogous to Lie algebra representations as infinitesimal representations associated to group representation in Lie group theory.

Generalisations exist for spinor fields, fibre bundles with a connection and vector-valued differential forms.

== Motivation ==
A 'naïve' attempt to define the derivative of a tensor field with respect to a vector field would be to take the components of the tensor field and take the directional derivative of each component with respect to the vector field. However, this definition is undesirable because it is not invariant under changes of coordinate system, e.g. the naive derivative expressed in polar or spherical coordinates differs from the naive derivative of the components in Cartesian coordinates. On an abstract manifold such a definition is meaningless and ill defined.

In differential geometry, there are three main coordinate independent notions of differentiation of tensor fields:

1. Lie derivatives,
2. derivatives with respect to connections,
3. the exterior derivative of totally antisymmetric covariant tensors, i.e. differential forms.

The main difference between the Lie derivative and a derivative with respect to a connection is that the latter derivative of a tensor field with respect to a tangent vector is well-defined even if it is not specified how to extend that tangent vector to a vector field. However, a connection requires the choice of an additional geometric structure (e.g. a Riemannian metric in the case of Levi-Civita connection, or just an abstract connection) on the manifold. In contrast, when taking a Lie derivative, no additional structure on the manifold is needed, but it is impossible to talk about the Lie derivative of a tensor field with respect to a single tangent vector, since the value of the Lie derivative of a tensor field with respect to a vector field X at a point p depends on the value of X in a neighborhood of p, not just at p itself. Finally, the exterior derivative of differential forms does not require any additional choices, but is only a well defined derivative of differential forms (including functions), thus excluding vectors and other tensors that are not purely differential forms.

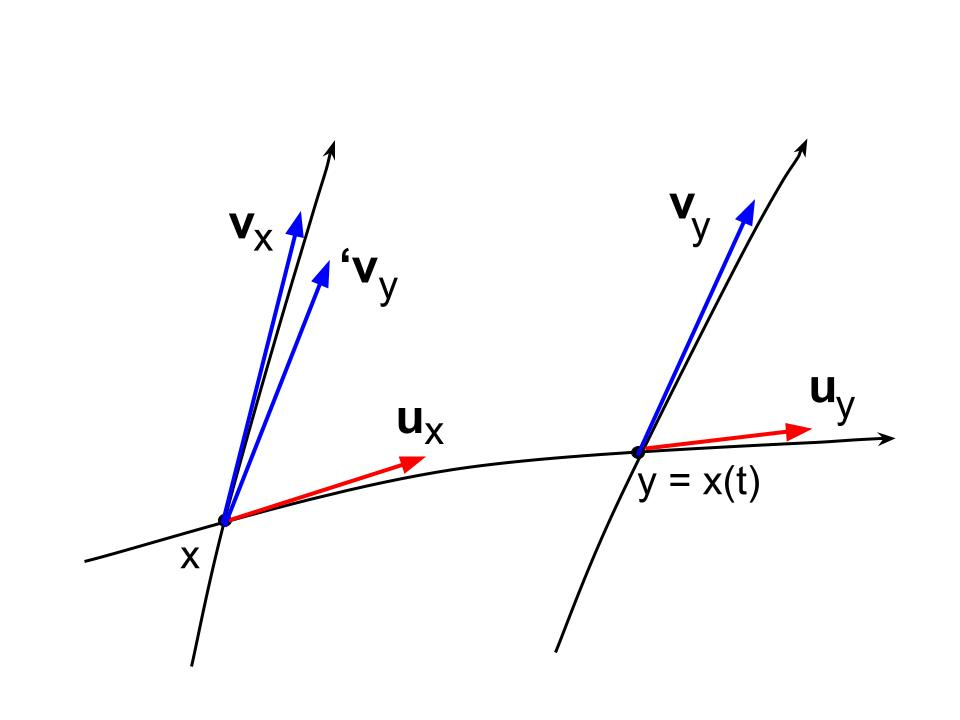
Lie transport of a vector $v_y$ from point $y$ to point $x$ along the vector flow field $u$.

The idea of Lie derivatives is to use a vector field to define a notion of transport (Lie transport). A smooth vector field defines a smooth flow on the manifold, which allows vectors to be transported between two points on the same line of flow (This contrasts with connections, which allows transport between arbitrary points). Intuitively, a vector $Y(p)$ based at point $p$ is transported by flowing its base point to $p'$, while flowing its tip point $p + Y(p) \delta$ to $p' + \delta p'$.

== Definition ==
The Lie derivative may be defined in several equivalent ways. To keep things simple, we begin by defining the Lie derivative acting on scalar functions and vector fields, before moving on to the definition for general tensors.

=== The (Lie) derivative of a function ===
Defining the derivative of a function $f\colon M \to {\mathbb R}$ on a manifold takes care because the difference quotient $\textstyle (f(x+h)-f(x))/h$ cannot be determined while the displacement $x+h$ is undefined.

The Lie derivative of a function $f\colon M\to {\mathbb R}$ with respect to a vector field $X$ at a point $p \in M$ is the function

$$(\mathcal{L}_X f) (p) = {d \over dt} \biggr|_{t=0} \bigl(f \circ \Phi^t_X\bigr)(p) = \lim_{t\to 0} \frac{f\bigl(\Phi^t_X(p)\bigr) - f\bigl(p\bigr)}{t}$$

where $\Phi^t_X(p)$ is the point to which the flow defined by the vector field $X$ maps the point $p$ at time instant $t.$ In the vicinity of $t=0,$ $\Phi^t_X(p)$ is the unique solution of the system

$$\frac{d}{dt}\biggr|_t \Phi^t_X(p) = X\bigl(\Phi^t_X(p)\bigr)$$

of first-order autonomous (i.e. time-independent) differential equations, with $\Phi^0_X(p) = p.$

Setting $\mathcal{L}_X f = \nabla_X f$ identifies the Lie derivative of a function with the directional derivative, which is also denoted by $X(f):= \mathcal{L}_X f = \nabla_X f$.

=== The Lie derivative of a vector field ===
If X and Y are both vector fields, then the Lie derivative of Y with respect to X is also known as the Lie bracket of X and Y, and is sometimes denoted $[X,Y]$. There are several approaches to defining the Lie bracket, all of which are equivalent. We list two definitions here, corresponding to the two definitions of a vector field given above:

- The Lie bracket of X and Y at p is given in local coordinates by the formula
  $$\mathcal{L}_X Y (p) = [X,Y](p) = \partial_X Y(p) - \partial_Y X(p),$$
  where $\partial_X$ and $\partial_Y$ denote the operations of taking the directional derivatives with respect to X and Y, respectively. Here we are treating a vector in n-dimensional space as an n-tuple, so that its directional derivative is simply the tuple consisting of the directional derivatives of its coordinates. Although the final expression $\partial_X Y(p) - \partial_Y X(p)$ appearing in this definition does not depend on the choice of local coordinates, the individual terms $\partial_X Y(p)$ and $\partial_Y X(p)$ do depend on the choice of coordinates.
- If X and Y are vector fields on a manifold M according to the second definition, then the operator $\mathcal{L}_X Y = [X,Y]$ defined by the formula
  $$[X,Y]: C^\infty(M) \rightarrow C^\infty(M)$$
  $$[X,Y](f) = X(Y(f)) - Y(X(f))$$
  is a derivation of order zero of the algebra of smooth functions of M, i.e. this operator is a vector field according to the second definition.

=== The Lie derivative of a tensor field ===
==== Definition in terms of flows ====
The Lie derivative is the speed with which the tensor field changes under the space deformation caused by the flow.

Formally, given a differentiable (time-independent) vector field $X$ on a smooth manifold $M,$ let $\Phi^t_X : M \to M$ be the corresponding local flow. Since $\Phi^t_X$ is a local diffeomorphism for each $t$, it gives rise to a pullback of tensor fields. For covariant tensors, this is just the multi-linear extension of the pullback map

$$\left(\Phi^t_X\right)^*_p : T^*_{\Phi^t_X(p)}M \to T^*_{p}M, \qquad \left(\left(\Phi^t_X\right)^*_p \alpha\right) (Y) = \alpha\bigl(T_p \Phi^t_X(Y)\bigr), \quad \alpha \in T^*_{\Phi^t_X(p)}M, Y \in T_{p}M$$
For contravariant tensors, one extends the inverse

$$\left(T_p\Phi^t_X\right)^{-1} : T_{\Phi^t_X(p)}M \to T_{p}M$$

of the differential $T_p\Phi^t_X$. For every $t,$ there is, consequently, a tensor field $(\Phi^t_X)^* T$ of the same type as $T$.

If $T$ is an $(r,0)$- or $(0,s)$-type tensor field, then the Lie derivative ${\cal L}_XT$ of $T$ along a vector field $X$ is defined at point $p \in M$ to be

$${\cal L}_X T(p) = \frac{d}{dt}\biggl|_{t=0} \left(\bigl(\Phi^t_X\bigr)^* T\right)_p = \frac{d}{dt}\biggl|_{t=0}\bigl(\Phi^t_X\bigr)^*_p T_{\Phi^t_X(p)}
= \lim_{t \to 0}\frac{\bigl(\Phi^t_X\bigr)^*T_{\Phi^t_X(p)} - T_p}{t}.$$

The resulting tensor field ${\cal L}_X T$ is of the same type as $T$.

More generally, for every smooth 1-parameter family $\Phi_t$ of diffeomorphisms that integrate a vector field $X$ in the sense that ${d \over dt}\biggr|_{t=0} \Phi_t = X \circ \Phi_0$, one has
$$\mathcal{L}_X T = \bigl(\Phi_0^{-1}\bigr)^* {d \over dt}\biggr|_{t=0} \Phi_t^* T = - {d \over dt}\biggr|_{t=0} \bigl(\Phi_t^{-1}\bigr)^* \Phi_0^* T \, .$$

==== Algebraic definition ====
We now give an algebraic definition. The algebraic definition for the Lie derivative of a tensor field follows from the following four axioms:

Axiom 1. The Lie derivative of a function is equal to the directional derivative of the function. This fact is often expressed by the formula

$$\mathcal{L}_Yf=Y(f)$$

Axiom 2. The Lie derivative obeys the following version of Leibniz's rule: For any tensor fields S and T, we have

$$\mathcal{L}_Y(S\otimes T)=(\mathcal{L}_YS)\otimes T+S\otimes (\mathcal{L}_YT).$$

Axiom 3. The Lie derivative obeys the Leibniz rule with respect to contraction:

$$\mathcal{L}_X (T(Y_1, \ldots, Y_n)) = (\mathcal{L}_X T)(Y_1,\ldots, Y_n) + T((\mathcal{L}_X Y_1), \ldots, Y_n) + \cdots + T(Y_1, \ldots, (\mathcal{L}_X Y_n))$$

Axiom 4. The Lie derivative commutes with exterior derivative on functions:

$$[\mathcal{L}_X, d] = 0$$

Using the first and third axioms, applying the Lie derivative $\mathcal{L}_X$ to $Y(f)$ shows that

$$\mathcal{L}_X Y (f) = X(Y(f)) - Y(X(f)),$$

which is one of the standard definitions for the Lie bracket.

The Lie derivative acting on a differential form is the anticommutator of the interior product with the exterior derivative. So if α is a differential form,

$$\mathcal{L}_Y\alpha=i_Yd\alpha+di_Y\alpha.$$

This follows easily by checking that the expression commutes with exterior derivative, is a derivation (being an anticommutator of graded derivations) and does the right thing on functions. This is Cartan's magic formula. See interior product for details.

Explicitly, let T be a tensor field of type (p, q). Consider T to be a differentiable multilinear map of smooth sections α^{1}, α^{2}, ..., α^{p} of the cotangent bundle T^{∗}M and of sections X_{1}, X_{2}, ..., X_{q} of the tangent bundle TM, written T(α^{1}, α^{2}, ..., X_{1}, X_{2}, ...) into R. Define the Lie derivative of T along Y by the formula

$(\mathcal{L}_Y T)(\alpha_1, \alpha_2, \ldots, X_1, X_2, \ldots) =Y(T(\alpha_1,\alpha_2,\ldots,X_1,X_2,\ldots))$

$$- T(\mathcal{L}_Y\alpha_1, \alpha_2, \ldots, X_1, X_2, \ldots)
- T(\alpha_1, \mathcal{L}_Y\alpha_2, \ldots, X_1, X_2, \ldots) -\ldots$$
$$- T(\alpha_1, \alpha_2, \ldots, \mathcal{L}_YX_1, X_2, \ldots)
-  T(\alpha_1, \alpha_2, \ldots, X_1, \mathcal{L}_YX_2, \ldots) - \ldots$$

The analytic and algebraic definitions can be proven to be equivalent using the properties of the pushforward and the Leibniz rule for differentiation. The Lie derivative commutes with the contraction.

=== The Lie derivative of a differential form ===
A particularly important class of tensor fields is the class of differential forms. The restriction of the Lie derivative to the space of differential forms is closely related to the exterior derivative. Both the Lie derivative and the exterior derivative attempt to capture the idea of a derivative in different ways. These differences can be bridged by introducing the idea of an interior product, after which the relationships falls out as an identity known as Cartan's formula. Cartan's formula can also be used as a definition of the Lie derivative on the space of differential forms.

Let $M$ be a manifold and $X$ a vector field on $M$. Let $\omega \in \Lambda^k(M)$ be a $k$-form, i.e., for each $p \in M$, $\omega(p)$ is an alternating multilinear map from $(T_p M)^k$ to the real numbers. The interior product of $X$ and $\omega$ is the $(k-1)$-form $i_X\omega$ defined as
$$(i_X\omega) (X_1, \ldots, X_{k-1}) = \omega (X,X_1, \ldots, X_{k-1})\,$$

The differential form $i_X\omega$ is also called the contraction of $\omega$ with $X$, and
$$i_X:\Lambda^k(M) \rightarrow \Lambda^{k-1}(M)$$

is a $\wedge$-antiderivation where $\wedge$ is the wedge product on differential forms. That is, $i_X$ is $\mathbb{R}$-linear, and
$$i_X (\omega \wedge \eta) = (i_X \omega) \wedge \eta + (-1)^k \omega \wedge (i_X \eta)$$

for $\omega \in \Lambda^k(M)$ and $\eta$ another differential form. Also, for a function $f \in \Lambda^0(M)$, that is, a real- or complex-valued function on $M$, one has
$$i_{fX} \omega = f\,i_X\omega,$$
where $f X$ denotes the product of $f$ and $X$.

The relationship between exterior derivatives and Lie derivatives can then be summarized as follows. First, since the Lie derivative of a function f with respect to a vector field X is the same as the directional derivative X(f), it is also the same as the contraction of the exterior derivative of f with X:

$$\mathcal{L}_Xf = i_X \, df$$

For a general differential form, the Lie derivative is likewise a contraction, taking into account the variation in X:

$$\mathcal{L}_X\omega = i_Xd\omega + d(i_X \omega).$$

This identity is known variously as Cartan formula, Cartan homotopy formula or Cartan's magic formula. See interior product for details. The Cartan formula can be used as a definition of the Lie derivative of a differential form. Cartan's formula shows in particular that

$$d\mathcal{L}_X\omega = \mathcal{L}_X(d\omega).$$

The Lie derivative also satisfies the relation

$$\mathcal{L}_{fX}\omega = f\mathcal{L}_X\omega + df \wedge i_X \omega .$$

== Coordinate expressions ==
In local coordinate notation, for a type $(r,s)$ tensor field $T$, the Lie derivative along $X$ is

$$\begin{align}
(\mathcal{L}_X T) ^{a_1 \ldots a_r}{}_{b_1 \ldots b_s} ={}
& X^c(\partial_c T^{a_1 \ldots a_r}{}_{b_1 \ldots b_s}) \\
& {}-{} (\partial_c X ^{a_1}) T ^{c a_2 \ldots a_r}{}_{b_1 \ldots b_s} - \ldots - (\partial_c X^{a_r}) T ^{a_1 \ldots a_{r-1}c}{}_{b_1 \ldots b_s} \\
& + (\partial_{b_1} X^c) T ^{a_1 \ldots a_r}{}_{c b_2 \ldots b_s} + \ldots + (\partial_{b_s}X^c) T ^{a_1 \ldots a_r}{}_{b_1 \ldots b_{s-1} c}
\end{align}$$

here, the notation $\partial_a = \frac{\partial}{\partial x^a}$ means taking the partial derivative with respect to the coordinate $x^a$. Alternatively, if we are using a torsion-free connection (e.g., the Levi Civita connection), then the partial derivative $\partial_a$ can be replaced with the covariant derivative which means replacing $\partial_a X^b$ with (by abuse of notation) $\nabla_a X^b = X^b_{;a} := (\nabla X)_a^{\ b} = \partial_a X^b + \Gamma^b_{ac}X^c$ where the $\Gamma^a_{bc} = \Gamma^a_{cb}$ are the Christoffel coefficients.

The Lie derivative of a tensor is another tensor of the same type, i.e., even though the individual terms in the expression depend on the choice of coordinate system, the expression as a whole results in a tensor

$$(\mathcal{L}_X T) ^{a_1 \ldots a_r}{}_{b_1 \ldots b_s}\partial_{a_1}\otimes\cdots\otimes\partial_{a_r}\otimes dx^{b_1}\otimes\cdots\otimes dx^{b_s}$$

which is independent of any coordinate system and of the same type as $T$.

The definition can be extended further to tensor densities. If T is a tensor density of some real number valued weight w (e.g. the volume density of weight 1), then its Lie derivative is a tensor density of the same type and weight.

$$\begin{align}
(\mathcal {L}_X T)^{a_1 \ldots a_r}{}_{b_1 \ldots b_s} ={}
&X^c(\partial_c T^{a_1 \ldots a_r}{}_{b_1 \ldots b_s}) - (\partial_c X ^{a_1}) T ^{c a_2 \ldots a_r}{}_{b_1 \ldots b_s} - \ldots - (\partial_c X^{a_r}) T ^{a_1 \ldots a_{r-1}c}{}_{b_1 \ldots b_s} + \\
&+ (\partial_{b_1} X^c) T ^{a_1 \ldots a_r}{}_{c b_2 \ldots b_s} + \ldots + (\partial_{b_s} X^c) T ^{a_1 \ldots a_r}{}_{b_1 \ldots b_{s-1} c} + w (\partial_{c} X^c) T ^{a_1 \ldots a_r}{}_{b_1 \ldots b_{s}}
\end{align}$$

Notice the new term at the end of the expression.

For a linear connection $\Gamma = ( \Gamma^{a}_{bc} )$, the Lie derivative along $X$ is

$$(\mathcal{L}_X \Gamma)^{a}_{bc} =  X^d\partial_d \Gamma^{a}_{bc} + \partial_b\partial_c X^a - \Gamma^{d}_{bc}\partial_d X^a + \Gamma^{a}_{dc}\partial_b X^d + \Gamma^{a}_{bd}\partial_c X^d.$$

=== Examples ===
For clarity we now show the following examples in local coordinate notation.

For a scalar field $\phi(x^c)\in\mathcal{F}(M)$ we have:

$$(\mathcal {L}_X \phi) = X(\phi) = X^a \partial_a \phi$$.

Hence for the scalar field $\phi(x,y) = x^2 - \sin(y)$ and the vector field $X^a\partial_a = \sin(x)\partial_y - y^2\partial_x$ the corresponding Lie derivative becomes
$$\begin{alignat}{3}
\mathcal{L}_X\phi &= (\sin(x)\partial_y - y^2\partial_x)(x^2 - \sin(y))\\
& = \sin(x)\partial_y(x^2 - \sin(y)) - y^2\partial_x(x^2 - \sin(y))\\
& = -\sin(x)\cos(y) - 2xy^2 \\
\end{alignat}$$

For an example of higher rank differential form, consider the 2-form $\omega = (x^2 + y^2)dx\wedge dz$ and the vector field $X$ from the previous example. Then,
$$\begin{align}
\mathcal{L}_X\omega & = d(i_{\sin(x)\partial_y - y^2\partial_x}((x^2 + y^2)dx\wedge dz)) + i_{\sin(x)\partial_y - y^2\partial_x}(d((x^2 + y^2)dx\wedge dz)) \\
& = d(-y^2(x^2 + y^2) dz) + i_{\sin(x)\partial_y - y^2\partial_x}(2ydy\wedge dx\wedge dz) \\
& = \left(- 2xy^2 dx + (-2yx^2  - 4y^3) dy\right) \wedge dz + (2y\sin(x)dx \wedge dz + 2y^3dy \wedge dz)\\
& = \left(-2xy^2 + 2y\sin(x)\right)dx\wedge dz + (-2yx^2 - 2y^3)dy\wedge dz
\end{align}$$

Some more abstract examples.

$$\mathcal{L}_X (dx^b) = d i_X (dx^b) = d X^b = \partial_a X^b dx^a$$.

Hence for a covector field, i.e., a differential form, $A = A_a(x^b)dx^a$ we have:

$$\mathcal{L}_X A =  X (A_a) dx^a +  A_b \mathcal{L}_X (dx^b) = (X^b \partial_b A_a + A_b\partial_a (X^b))dx^a$$

The coefficient of the last expression is the local coordinate expression of the Lie derivative.

For a covariant rank 2 tensor field $T = T_{ab}(x^c)dx^a \otimes dx^b$ we have:
$$\begin{align}
(\mathcal {L}_X T) &= (\mathcal {L}_X T)_{ab} dx^a\otimes dx^b\\
&= X(T_{ab})dx^a\otimes dx^b + T_{cb} \mathcal{L}_X (dx^c) \otimes dx^b + T_{ac}  dx^a \otimes \mathcal{L}_X (dx^c)\\
&= (X^c \partial_c T_{ab}+T_{cb}\partial_a X^c+T_{ac}\partial_b X^c)dx^a\otimes dx^b\\
\end{align}$$

If $T = g$ is the symmetric metric tensor, it is parallel with respect to the Levi-Civita connection (aka covariant derivative), and it becomes fruitful to use the connection. This has the effect of replacing all derivatives with covariant derivatives, giving

$$(\mathcal {L}_X g) = (X^c g_{ab; c} + g_{cb}X^c_{;a} + g_{ac}X^c_{; b})dx^a\otimes dx^b = (X_{b;a} + X_{a;b}) dx^a\otimes dx^b$$

== Properties ==
The Lie derivative has a number of properties. Let $\mathcal{F}(M)$ be the algebra of functions defined on the manifold $M$. Then

$$\mathcal{L}_X : \mathcal{F}(M) \rightarrow \mathcal{F}(M)$$

is a derivation on the algebra $\mathcal{F}(M)$. That is, $\mathcal{L}_X$ is $\mathbb{R}$-linear and

$$\mathcal{L}_X(fg) = (\mathcal{L}_Xf) g + f\mathcal{L}_Xg.$$

Similarly, it is a derivation on $\mathcal{F}(M) \times \mathcal{X}(M)$ where $\mathcal{X}(M)$ is the set of vector fields on $M$:

$$\mathcal{L}_X(fY) = (\mathcal{L}_Xf) Y + f\mathcal{L}_X Y$$

which may also be written in the equivalent notation

$$\mathcal{L}_X(f\otimes Y) = (\mathcal{L}_Xf) \otimes Y + f\otimes \mathcal{L}_X Y$$

where the tensor product symbol $\otimes$ is used to emphasize the fact that the product of a function times a vector field is being taken over the entire manifold.

Additional properties are consistent with that of the Lie bracket. Thus, for example, considered as a derivation on a vector field,

$$\mathcal{L}_X [Y,Z] = [\mathcal{L}_X Y,Z] + [Y,\mathcal{L}_X Z]$$

one finds the above to be just the Jacobi identity. Thus, one has the important result that the space of vector fields over M, equipped with the Lie bracket, forms a Lie algebra.

The Lie derivative also has important properties when acting on differential forms. Let α and β be two differential forms on M, and let X and Y be two vector fields. Then

- $\mathcal{L}_X(\alpha\wedge\beta) = (\mathcal{L}_X\alpha) \wedge\beta + \alpha\wedge (\mathcal{L}_X\beta)$
- $[\mathcal{L}_X,\mathcal{L}_Y]\alpha := \mathcal{L}_X\mathcal{L}_Y\alpha-\mathcal{L}_Y\mathcal{L}_X\alpha = \mathcal{L}_{[X,Y]}\alpha$
- $[\mathcal{L}_X,i_Y]\alpha = [i_X,\mathcal{L}_Y]\alpha = i_{[X,Y]}\alpha,$ where i denotes interior product defined above and it is clear whether [·,·] denotes the commutator or the Lie bracket of vector fields.

== Generalizations ==
Various generalizations of the Lie derivative play an important role in differential geometry.

=== The Lie derivative of a spinor field ===
A definition for Lie derivatives of spinors along generic spacetime vector fields, not necessarily Killing ones, on a general (pseudo) Riemannian manifold was already proposed in 1971 by Yvette Kosmann. Later, it was provided a geometric framework which justifies her ad hoc prescription within the general framework of Lie derivatives on fiber bundles in the explicit context of gauge natural bundles which turn out to be the most appropriate arena for (gauge-covariant) field theories.

In a given spin manifold, that is in a Riemannian manifold $(M,g)$ admitting a spin structure, the Lie derivative of a spinor field $\psi$ can be defined by first defining it with respect to infinitesimal isometries (Killing vector fields) via the André Lichnerowicz's local expression given in 1963:

$$\mathcal{L}_X \psi := X^{a}\nabla_{a}\psi - \frac14\nabla_{a}X_{b} \gamma^{a}\gamma^{b}\psi\, ,$$

where $\nabla_{a}X_{b} = \nabla_{[a}X_{b]}$, as $X = X^{a}\partial_{a}$ is assumed to be a Killing vector field, and $\gamma^{a}$ are Dirac matrices.

It is then possible to extend Lichnerowicz's definition to all vector fields (generic infinitesimal transformations) by retaining Lichnerowicz's local expression for a generic vector field $X$, but explicitly taking the antisymmetric part of $\nabla_{a}X_{b}$ only. More explicitly, Kosmann's local expression given in 1972 is:

$$\mathcal{L}_X \psi := X^{a}\nabla_{a}\psi - \frac18\nabla_{[a}X_{b]}[\gamma^{a},\gamma^{b}]\psi\, = \nabla_X \psi - \frac14 (d X^\flat)\cdot \psi\, ,$$

where $[\gamma^{a},\gamma^{b}]= \gamma^a\gamma^b - \gamma^b\gamma^a$ is the commutator, $d$ is exterior derivative, $X^\flat = g(X, -)$ is the dual 1 form corresponding to $X$ under the metric (i.e. with lowered indices) and $\cdot$ is Clifford multiplication.

It is worth noting that the spinor Lie derivative is independent of the metric, and hence also of the connection. This is not obvious from the right-hand side of Kosmann's local expression, as the right-hand side seems to depend on the metric through the spin connection (covariant derivative), the dualisation of vector fields (lowering of the indices) and the Clifford multiplication on the spinor bundle. Such is not the case: the quantities on the right-hand side of Kosmann's local expression combine so as to make all metric and connection dependent terms cancel.

To gain a better understanding of the long-debated concept of Lie derivative of spinor fields one may refer to the original article, where the definition of a Lie derivative of spinor fields is placed in the more general framework of the theory of Lie derivatives of sections of fiber bundles and the direct approach by Y. Kosmann to the spinor case is generalized to gauge natural bundles in the form of a new geometric concept called the Kosmann lift.

As for the tensor counterpart, also for spinors the vanishing of the Lie derivative along a Killing vector implements on the spinor the symmetries encoded by that Killing vector. However, differently from tensors, from spinors it is possible to build bi-linear quantities (such as the velocity vector $\overline{\psi}\gamma^{a}\psi$ or the spin axial-vector $\overline{\psi}\gamma^{a}\gamma^5\psi$) which are tensors. A natural question that now arises is whether the vanishing of the Lie derivative along a Killing vector of a spinor is equivalent to the vanishing of the Lie derivative along the same Killing vector of all the spinor bi-linear quantities. While a spinor that is Lie-invariant implies that all its bi-linear quantities are also Lie invariant, the converse is in general not true.

=== Covariant Lie derivative ===
If we have a principal bundle over the manifold M with G as the structure group, and we pick X to be a covariant vector field as section of the tangent space of the principal bundle (i.e. it has horizontal and vertical components), then the covariant Lie derivative is just the Lie derivative with respect to X over the principal bundle.

Now, if we're given a vector field Y over M (but not the principal bundle) but we also have a connection over the principal bundle, we can define a vector field X over the principal bundle such that its horizontal component matches Y and its vertical component agrees with the connection. This is the covariant Lie derivative.

See connection form for more details.

=== Nijenhuis–Lie derivative ===
Another generalization, due to Albert Nijenhuis, allows one to define the Lie derivative of a differential form along any section of the bundle Ω^{k}(M, TM) of differential forms with values in the tangent bundle. If K ∈ Ω^{k}(M, TM) and α is a differential p-form, then it is possible to define the interior product i_{K}α of K and α. The Nijenhuis–Lie derivative is then the anticommutator of the interior product and the exterior derivative:

$$\mathcal{L}_K\alpha=[d,i_K]\alpha = di_K\alpha-(-1)^{k-1}i_K \, d\alpha.$$

== History ==
In 1931, Władysław Ślebodziński introduced a new differential operator, later called by David van Dantzig that of Lie derivation, which can be applied to scalars, vectors, tensors and affine connections and which proved to be a powerful instrument in the study of groups of automorphisms.

The Lie derivatives of general geometric objects (i.e., sections of natural fiber bundles) were studied by A. Nijenhuis, Y. Tashiro and K. Yano.

For a quite long time, physicists had been using Lie derivatives, without reference to the work of mathematicians. In 1940, Léon Rosenfeld—and before him (in 1921) Wolfgang Pauli—introduced what he called a ‘local variation’ $\delta^{\ast}A$ of a geometric object $A\,$ induced by an infinitesimal transformation of coordinates generated by a vector field $X\,$. One can easily prove that his $\delta^{\ast}A$ is $- \mathcal{L}_X(A)\,$.

== See also ==
- Covariant derivative
- Connection (mathematics)
- Frölicher–Nijenhuis bracket
- Geodesic
- Killing field
- Derivative of the exponential map
