= Hans Samelson =

German-American mathematician

- Born: 3 March 1916; Strassburg
- Died: 22 September 2005 (aged 89); Palo Alto, California
- Education: ETH Zürich
- Scientific career
- Fields: Mathematics
- Workplaces: Stanford University; University of Michigan
- Doctoral advisor: Heinz Hopf; Ferdinand Gonseth
- Doctoral students: Allen Hatcher; Roger W. Richardson

Hans Samelson (3 March 1916 – 22 September 2005) was a German-American mathematician who worked in differential geometry, topology and the theory of Lie groups and Lie algebras—important in describing the symmetry of analytical structures.

== Career and personal life ==
The eldest of three sons, Samelson was born on 3 March 1916, in Strassburg, Germany (now Strasbourg, France). His brother Klaus later became a mathematician and early computer science pioneer in Germany. His parents—one of Protestant and one of Jewish background—were both pediatricians. He spent most of his youth in Breslau, Silesia, Germany (now Wrocław, Poland), and began his advanced mathematical education there, at the University of Breslau. His family helped him leave Nazi Germany in 1936 for Zurich, Switzerland, where he studied with the geometer Heinz Hopf and received his doctorate in 1940 from the Swiss Federal Institute of Technology.

In 1941, he accepted a position at the Institute for Advanced Study in Princeton and immigrated to the United States; he arrived by ship six months before the United States entered World War II and acquired U.S. citizenship several years later. After leaving Princeton, he held faculty positions at the University of Wyoming (1942–1943), Syracuse University (1943–1946) and the University of Michigan (1946–1960) before coming to Stanford in 1960. He was recognized with the Dean's Award for Distinguished Teaching in 1977. He served as chair of the Mathematics Department from 1979 to 1982.

Though he became emeritus in 1986, he remained professionally active throughout his retirement, publishing articles on both contemporary and historical mathematical topics. One solved an architectural puzzle associated with the construction of the Brunelleschi Dome in Florence, Italy.

He was active in the Palo Alto Friends Meeting (Quakers) during his retirement, serving as treasurer for several years.

== See also ==
- Bott–Samelson variety

== Publications ==
- Samelson, Hans (1946). "A note on Lie groups". Bull. Amer. Math. Soc. 52 (10): 870–873. doi:10.1090/s0002-9904-1946-08663-2. MR 0018650.
- Samelson, Hans (1952). "Topology of Lie groups". Bull. Amer. Math. Soc. 58 (1): 2–37. doi:10.1090/s0002-9904-1952-09544-6. MR 0045129.
- Samelson, Hans (1978). "On Darboux's lemma". Proc. Amer. Math. Soc. 70 (2): 126–128. doi:10.1090/s0002-9939-1978-0474367-0. MR 0474367.
- Samelson, Hans (1995). "Darboux's lemma once more". Proc. Amer. Math. Soc. 123 (4): 1253–1255. doi:10.1090/s0002-9939-1995-1246536-3. MR 1246536.
- Notes on Lie Algebras
- Selected Chapters on Geometry (translation by Hans Samelson)
- Hans Samelson, renowned mathematician, dead; Nov. 6 memorial service set
