= ( ) (disambiguation) =

"( )" or two parentheses (40 and 41 in ASCII) may refer to:

- Function prototype, no arguments or unknown arguments, in some programming languages
- The unit type in some programming languages
- ( ) (album), a 2002 album by Sigur Rós
- ( ) (film), a 2003 short film directed by Morgan Fisher
- A hug, in emoticon
- The stage name of Kim Carlsson, a member of the Swedish black metal band Lifelover

== See also ==
- Parenthesis (disambiguation)
