= Cocurvature =

In mathematics in the branch of differential geometry, the cocurvature of a connection on a manifold is the obstruction to the integrability of the vertical bundle.

== Definition ==
If M is a manifold and P is a connection on M, that is a vector-valued 1-form on M which is a projection on TM such that P_{a}^{b}P_{b}^{c} = P_{a}^{c}, then the cocurvature $\bar{R}_P$ is a vector-valued 2-form on M defined by

$$\bar{R}_P(X,Y) = (\operatorname{Id} - P)[PX,PY]$$

where X and Y are vector fields on M.

== See also ==
- Curvature
- Lie bracket
- Frölicher-Nijenhuis bracket
