= Math symbol brackets =

Brackets as a mathematical symbol may refer to:

== Parentheses "()" ==
- Argument of a function in mathematical functions
- A set of coordinates in a coordinate system
- Tuple, a sequence of elements
- The greatest common divisor of two numbers
- Equivalence class congruence, especially for modular arithmetic or modulo an ideal
- A higher order derivative in Lagrange's notation
- Binomial or multinomial coefficient

== Square brackets "[]" ==
- Commutator, an indicator to which a binary operation fails to be commutative
- Iverson bracket, notation
- Lie bracket of vector fields, operator

== Chevrons "〈〉" ==
- Dirac notation, in quantum mechanics
- Moment, measures relating to the shape of a function's graph
- Linear span, a set of all linear combinations of vectors
- Mean, mean of a set of values (e.g.〈x〉= (x_{1} + ... + x_{n}) / n)

== Other uses ==
- Order of operations, uses multiple types of brackets
- Set, uses braces "{}"
- Interval, uses square brackets and parentheses
- Matrix, uses square brackets and parentheses
- Inner product space, uses parentheses and chevrons

== See also ==
- Glossary of mathematical symbols
