= Yvette Kosmann-Schwarzbach =

French mathematician and professor (born 1941)

- Born: 30 April 1941 (age 85)
- Education: University of Paris
- Known for: Kosmann lift
- Scientific career
- Fields: Mathematics
- Workplaces: École polytechnique University of Lille
- Thesis: Dérivées de Lie des spineurs (1970)
- Doctoral advisor: André Lichnerowicz
- Website: https://www.cmls.polytechnique.fr/perso/kosmann/

Yvette Kosmann-Schwarzbach (born 30 April 1941) is a French mathematician and professor.

== Education and career ==
Kosmann-Schwarzbach obtained her doctoral degree in 1970 at the University of Paris under supervision of André Lichnerowicz on a dissertation titled Dérivées de Lie des spineurs (Lie derivatives of spinors).

She worked at Lille University of Science and Technology, and since 1993 at the École polytechnique.

== Research ==
Kosmann-Schwarzbach is the author of over fifty articles on differential geometry, algebra and mathematical physics, of two books on Lie groups and on the Noether theorem, as well as the co-editor of several books concerning the theory of integrable systems. The Kosmann lift in differential geometry is named after her.

== Works ==
- Groups and Symmetries: From Finite Groups to Lie Groups. Translated by Stephanie Frank Singer. Springer 2010, ISBN 978-0387788654.
- The Noether Theorems: Invariance and Conservation Laws in the Twentieth Century. Translated by Bertram Schwarzbach. Springer 2011, ISBN 978-0387878676.
