= Jan Arnoldus Schouten =

Dutch mathematician (1883–1971)

Jan A. Schouten
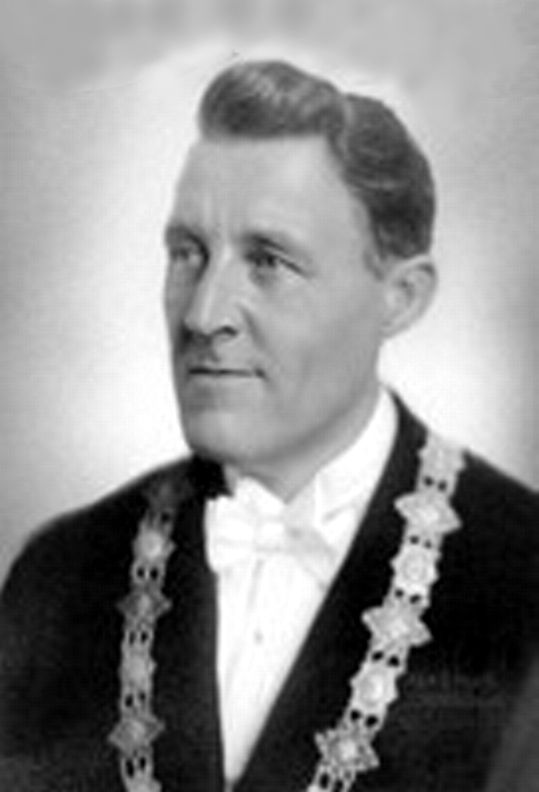
- J. A. Schouten, 1938–39
- Born: 28 August 1883; Nieuwer-Amstel
- Died: 20 January 1971 (aged 87); Epe
- Education: Delft University of Technology
- Known for: Schouten tensor Schouten–Nijenhuis bracket Weyl–Schouten theorem
- Scientific career
- Fields: Mathematics
- Workplaces: Leiden University
- Doctoral advisor: Jacob Cardinaal
- Doctoral students: Johannes Haantjes; Albert Nijenhuis; Dirk Struik

Jan Arnoldus Schouten (28 August 1883 – 20 January 1971) was a Dutch mathematician and Professor at the Delft University of Technology. He was an important contributor to the development of tensor calculus and Ricci calculus, and was one of the founders of the Mathematisch Centrum in Amsterdam.

== Biography ==
Schouten was born in Nieuwer-Amstel to a family of eminent shipping magnates. He attended a Hogere Burger School, and later he took up studies in electrical engineering at the Delft Polytechnical School. After graduating in 1908, he worked for Siemens in Berlin and for a public utility in Rotterdam before returning to study mathematics in Delft in 1912. During his study he had become fascinated by the power and subtleties of vector analysis. After a short while in industry, he returned to Delft to study Mathematics, where he received his Ph.D. degree in 1914 under supervision of Jacob Cardinaal with a thesis entitled Grundlagen der Vektor- und Affinoranalysis.

Schouten was an effective university administrator and leader of mathematical societies. During his tenure as professor and as institute head he was involved in various controversies with the topologist and intuitionist mathematician L. E. J. Brouwer. He was a shrewd investor as well as mathematician and successfully managed the budget of the institute and Dutch mathematical society. He hosted the International Congress of Mathematicians in Amsterdam in early 1954, and gave the opening address. Schouten was one of the founders of the Mathematisch Centrum in Amsterdam.

Among his doctoral students were Johanna Manders (1919), Dirk Struik (1922), Johannes Haantjes (1933), Wouter van der Kulk (1945), and Albert Nijenhuis (1952).

In 1933 Schouten became member of the Royal Netherlands Academy of Arts and Sciences.

Schouten died in 1971 in Epe. His son Jan Frederik Schouten (1910-1980) was Professor at the Eindhoven University of Technology from 1958 to 1978.

== Work ==
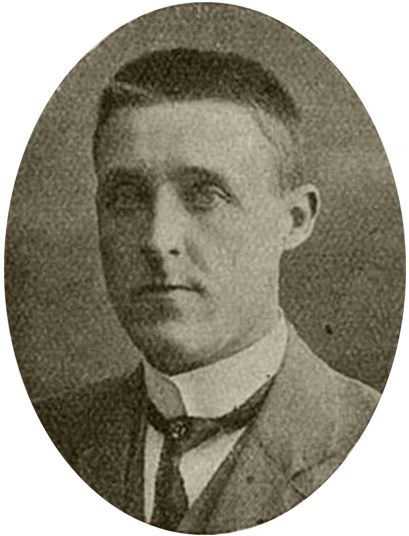
Dr. J.A. Schouten, 1913

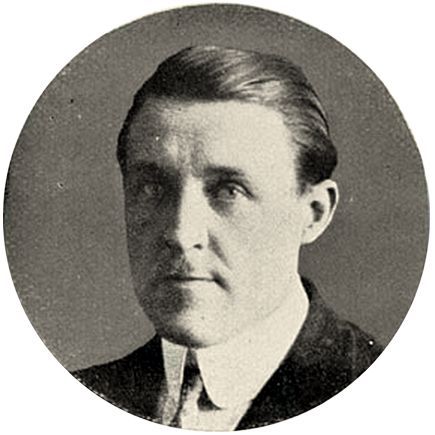
Prof. Dr. J.A. Schouten, 1923

=== Grundlagen der Vektor- und Affinoranalysis ===
Schouten's dissertation applied his "direct analysis", modeled on the vector analysis of Josiah Willard Gibbs and Oliver Heaviside, to higher order tensor-like entities he called affinors. The symmetrical subset of affinors were tensors in the physicists' sense of Woldemar Voigt.

Entities such as axiators, perversors, and deviators appear in this analysis. Just as vector analysis has dot products and cross products, so affinor analysis has different kinds of products for tensors of various levels. However, instead of two kinds of multiplication symbols, Schouten had at least twenty. This made the work a chore to read, although the conclusions were valid.

Schouten later said in conversation with Hermann Weyl that he would "like to throttle the man who wrote this book." (Karin Reich, in her history of tensor analysis, misattributes this quote to Weyl.) Weyl did, however, say that Schouten's early book has "orgies of formalism that threaten the peace of even the technical scientist." (Space, Time, Matter, p. 54). Roland Weitzenböck wrote of "the terrible book he has committed."

=== Levi-Civita connection ===
In 1906, L. E. J. Brouwer was the first mathematician to consider the parallel transport of a vector for the case of a space of constant curvature. In 1917, Tullio Levi-Civita pointed out its importance for the case of a hypersurface immersed in a Euclidean space, i.e., for the case of a Riemannian manifold immersed in a "larger" ambient space. In 1918, independently of Levi-Civita, Schouten obtained analogous results. In the same year, Hermann Weyl generalized Levi-Civita's results. Schouten's derivation is generalized to many dimensions rather than just two, and Schouten's proofs are completely intrinsic rather than extrinsic, unlike Tullio Levi-Civita's. Despite this, since Schouten's article appeared almost a year after Levi-Civita's, the latter got the credit. Schouten was unaware of Levi-Civita's work because of poor journal distribution and communication during World War I. Schouten engaged in a losing priority dispute with Levi-Civita. Schouten's colleague L. E. J. Brouwer took sides against Schouten. Once Schouten became aware of Ricci's and Levi-Civita's work, he embraced their simpler and more widely accepted notation. With David van Dantzig, Schouten also developed what is now known as a Kähler manifold two years before Erich Kähler. Again he did not receive full recognition for this discovery.

=== Works by Schouten ===
Schouten's name appears in various mathematical entities and theorems, such as the Schouten tensor, the Schouten bracket and the Weyl–Schouten theorem.

He wrote Der Ricci-Kalkül in 1922 surveying the field of tensor analysis.

In 1931 he wrote a treatise on tensors and differential geometry. The second volume, on applications to differential geometry, was authored by his student Dirk Jan Struik.

Schouten collaborated with Élie Cartan on two articles as well as with many other eminent mathematicians such as Kentaro Yano (with whom he co-authored three papers). Through his student and co-author Dirk Struik his work influenced many mathematicians in the United States.

In the 1950s Schouten completely rewrote and updated the German version of Ricci-Kalkül and this was translated into English as Ricci Calculus. This covers everything that Schouten considered of value in tensor analysis. This included work on Lie groups and other topics and that had been much developed since the first edition.

Later Schouten wrote Tensor Analysis for Physicists attempting to present the subtleties of various aspects of tensor calculus for mathematically inclined physicists. It included Paul Dirac's matrix calculus. He still used part of his earlier affinor terminology.

Schouten, like Weyl and Cartan, was stimulated by Albert Einstein's theory of general relativity. He co-authored a paper with Alexander Aleksandrovich Friedmann of Petersburg and another with Václav Hlavatý. He interacted with Oswald Veblen of Princeton University, and corresponded with Wolfgang Pauli on spin space. (See H. Goenner, Living Review link below.)

== Publications ==
Following is a list of works by Schouten.

- Grundlagen der Vektor- und Affinoranalysis, Leipzig: Teubner, 1914.
- On the Determination of the Principle Laws of Statistical Astronomy, Amsterdam: Kirchner, 1918.
- Der Ricci-Kalkül, Berlin: Julius Springer, 1924.
- Einführung in die neueren Methoden der Differentialgeometrie, 2 vols., Gröningen: Noordhoff, 1935–8.
- Ricci Calculus 2d edition thoroughly revised and enlarged, New York: Springer-Verlag, 1954.
- With W. Van der Kulk, Pfaff's Problem and Its Generalizations, Clarendon Press, 1949; 2nd edn, New York: Chelsea Publishing Co., 1969.
- Tensor Analysis for Physicists 2d edn., New York: Dover Publications, 1989.
