= Kosmann lift =

In differential geometry, the Kosmann lift, named after Yvette Kosmann-Schwarzbach, of a vector field $X\,$ on a Riemannian manifold $(M,g)\,$ is the canonical projection $X_{K}\,$ on the orthonormal frame bundle of its natural lift $\hat{X}\,$ defined on the bundle of linear frames.

Generalisations exist for any given reductive G-structure.

== Introduction ==
In general, given a subbundle $Q\subset E\,$ of a fiber bundle $\pi_{E}\colon E\to M\,$ over $M$ and a vector field $Z\,$ on $E$, its restriction $Z\vert_Q\,$ to $Q$ is a vector field "along" $Q$ not on (i.e., tangent to) $Q$. If one denotes by $i_{Q} \colon Q\hookrightarrow E$ the canonical embedding, then $Z\vert_Q\,$ is a section of the pullback bundle $i^{\ast}_{Q}(TE) \to Q\,$, where

$$i^{\ast}_{Q}(TE) = \{(q,v) \in Q \times TE \mid i(q) = \tau_{E}(v)\}\subset Q\times TE,\,$$

and $\tau_{E}\colon TE\to E\,$ is the tangent bundle of the fiber bundle $E$. Let us assume that we are given a Kosmann decomposition of the pullback bundle $i^{\ast}_{Q}(TE) \to Q\,$, such that

$$i^{\ast}_{Q}(TE) = TQ\oplus \mathcal M(Q),\,$$

i.e., at each $q\in Q$ one has $T_qE=T_qQ\oplus \mathcal M_u\,,$ where $\mathcal M_{u}$ is a vector subspace of $T_qE\,$ and we assume $\mathcal M(Q)\to Q\,$ to be a vector bundle over $Q$, called the transversal bundle of the Kosmann decomposition. It follows that the restriction $Z\vert_Q\,$ to $Q$ splits into a tangent vector field $Z_K\,$ on $Q$ and a transverse vector field $Z_G,\,$ being a section of the vector bundle $\mathcal M(Q)\to Q.\,$

== Definition ==
Let $\mathrm F_{SO}(M)\to M$ be the oriented orthonormal frame bundle of an oriented $n$-dimensional Riemannian manifold $M$ with given metric $g\,$. This is a principal ${\mathrm S\mathrm O}(n)\,$-subbundle of $\mathrm FM\,$, the tangent frame bundle of linear frames over $M$ with structure group ${\mathrm G\mathrm L}(n,\mathbb R)\,$. By definition, one may say that we are given with a classical reductive ${\mathrm S\mathrm O}(n)\,$-structure. The special orthogonal group ${\mathrm S\mathrm O}(n)\,$ is a reductive Lie subgroup of ${\mathrm G\mathrm L}(n,\mathbb R)\,$. In fact, there exists a direct sum decomposition $\mathfrak{gl}(n)=\mathfrak{so}(n)\oplus \mathfrak{m}\,$, where $\mathfrak{gl}(n)\,$ is the Lie algebra of ${\mathrm G\mathrm L}(n,\mathbb R)\,$, $\mathfrak{so}(n)\,$ is the Lie algebra of ${\mathrm S\mathrm O}(n)\,$, and $\mathfrak{m}\,$ is the $\mathrm{Ad}_{\mathrm S\mathrm O}\,$-invariant vector subspace of symmetric matrices, i.e. $\mathrm{Ad}_{a}\mathfrak{m}\subset\mathfrak{m}\,$ for all $a\in{\mathrm S\mathrm O}(n)\,.$

Let $i_{\mathrm F_{SO}(M)} \colon \mathrm F_{SO}(M)\hookrightarrow \mathrm FM$ be the canonical embedding.

One then can prove that there exists a canonical Kosmann decomposition of the pullback bundle $i^{\ast}_{\mathrm F_{SO}(M)}(T\mathrm FM) \to \mathrm F_{SO}(M)$ such that

$$i^{\ast}_{\mathrm F_{SO}(M)}(T\mathrm FM)=T\mathrm F_{SO}(M)\oplus \mathcal M(\mathrm F_{SO}(M))\,,$$

i.e., at each $u\in \mathrm F_{SO}(M)$ one has $T_u\mathrm FM=T_u \mathrm F_{SO}(M)\oplus \mathcal M_u\,,$ $\mathcal M_{u}$ being the fiber over $u$ of the subbundle $\mathcal M(\mathrm F_{SO}(M))\to \mathrm F_{SO}(M)$ of $i^{\ast}_{\mathrm F_{SO}(M)}(V\mathrm FM) \to \mathrm F_{SO}(M)$. Here, $V\mathrm FM\,$ is the vertical subbundle of $T\mathrm FM\,$ and at each $u\in \mathrm F_{SO}(M)$ the fiber $\mathcal M_{u}$ is isomorphic to the vector space of symmetric matrices $\mathfrak{m}$.

From the above canonical and equivariant decomposition, it follows that the restriction $Z\vert_{\mathrm F_{SO}(M)}$ of an ${\mathrm G\mathrm L}(n,\mathbb R)$-invariant vector field $Z\,$ on $\mathrm FM$ to $\mathrm F_{SO}(M)$ splits into a ${\mathrm S\mathrm O}(n)$-invariant vector field $Z_{K}\,$ on $\mathrm F_{SO}(M)$, called the Kosmann vector field associated with $Z\,$, and a transverse vector field $Z_{G}\,$.

In particular, for a generic vector field $X\,$ on the base manifold $(M,g)\,$, it follows that the restriction $\hat{X}\vert_{\mathrm F_{SO}(M)}\,$ to $\mathrm F_{SO}(M)\to M$ of its natural lift $\hat{X}\,$ onto $\mathrm FM\to M$ splits into a ${\mathrm S\mathrm O}(n)$-invariant vector field $X_{K}\,$ on $\mathrm F_{SO}(M)$, called the Kosmann lift of $X\,$, and a transverse vector field $X_{G}\,$.

== See also ==
- Frame bundle
- Orthonormal frame bundle
- Principal bundle
- Spin bundle
- Connection (mathematics)
- G-structure
- Spin manifold
- Spin structure
