= Roger Wolcott Richardson =

American mathematician

Roger Wolcott Richardson (30 May 1930 – 15 June 1993) was a mathematician noted for his work in representation theory and geometry.

== Life ==
Richardson was born in Baton Rouge, Louisiana, and educated at Louisiana State University, Harvard University and University of Michigan, Ann Arbor where he obtained a Ph.D. in 1958 under the supervision of Hans Samelson. After a postdoc appointment at Princeton University, he accepted a faculty position at the University of Washington in Seattle. He emigrated to the United Kingdom in 1970, taking up a chair at Durham University. In 1978 he moved to the Australian National University in Canberra, where he stayed as faculty until his death.

Richardson's best known result states that if P is a parabolic subgroup of a reductive group, then P has a dense orbit on its nilradical, i.e., one whose closure is the whole space. This orbit is now universally known as the Richardson orbit.

He was elected a Fellow of the Australian Academy of Science in 1990.

In 1997 the Cambridge University Press published Algebraic Groups and Lie Groups: A Volume of Papers in Honour of the Late R. W. Richardson, which was organized by a committee of 5 mathematicians selected by the Australian Mathematical Society. The volume's preface has several paragraphs about Richardson's research.

== Publications ==
- Nijenhuis, Albert; Richardson Jr., Roger W. (1966). "Cohomology and deformations in graded Lie algebras". Bulletin of the American Mathematical Society. 72 (1): 1–29. doi:10.1090/s0002-9904-1966-11401-5. MR 0195995.

== See also ==
- Prehomogeneous vector space
