= Natural bundle =

In differential geometry, a field in mathematics, a natural bundle is any fiber bundle associated to the higher order frame bundle $F^r(M)$, for some $r \geq 1$. In other words, its transition functions depend functionally on local changes of coordinates in the base manifold $M$ together with their partial derivatives up to order at most $r$.

The concept of a natural bundle was introduced in 1972 by Albert Nijenhuis as a modern reformulation of the classical concept of an arbitrary bundle of geometric objects.

== Definition ==
Let $\mathcal{M}f$ denote the category of smooth manifolds and smooth maps and $\mathcal{M}f_n$ the category of smooth $n$-dimensional manifolds and local diffeomorphisms. Consider also the category $\mathcal{FM}$ of fibred manifolds and bundle morphisms, and the functor $B: \mathcal{FM} \to \mathcal{M}f$ associating to any fibred manifold its base manifold.

A natural bundle (or bundle functor) is a functor $F: \mathcal{M}f_n \to \mathcal{FM}$ satisfying the following three properties:

1. $B \circ F = \mathrm{id}$, i.e. $F(M)$ is a fibred manifold over $M$, with projection denoted by $p_M: F(M) \to M$;
2. if $U \subseteq M$ is an open submanifold, with inclusion map $i: U \hookrightarrow M$, then $F(U)$ coincides with $p_M^{-1}(U) \subseteq F(M)$, and $F(i): F(U) \to F(M)$ is the inclusion $p^{-1}(U) \hookrightarrow F(M)$;
3. for any smooth map $f: P \times M \to N$ such that $f (p, \cdot): M \to N$ is a local diffeomorphism for every $p \in P$, then the function $P \times F(M) \to F(N), (p,x) \mapsto F(f (p,\cdot)) (x)$ is smooth.

As a consequence of the first condition, one has a natural transformation $p: F \to \mathrm{id}_{\mathcal{M}f_n}$.

== Finite order natural bundles ==
A natural bundle $F: \mathcal{M}f_n \to \mathcal{FM}$ is called of finite order $r$ if, for every local diffeomorphism $f: M \to N$ and every point $x \in M$, the map $F(f)_x: F(M)_{x} \to F(N)_{f(x)}$ depends only on the jet $j^r_x f$. Equivalently, for every local diffeomorphisms $f,g: M \to N$ and every point $x \in M$, one has
$$j^r_x f = j^r_x g \Rightarrow F(f)|_{F(M)_x} =  F(g)|_{F(M)_x}.$$
Natural bundles of order $r$ coincide with the associated fibre bundles to the $r$-th order frame bundles $F^r(M)$.

After various intermediate cases, it was proved by Epstein and Thurston that all natural bundles have finite order.

== Natural $\Gamma$-bundles ==
The notion of natural $\Gamma$-bundle arises from that of natural bundle by restricting to the suitable categories of $\Gamma$-manifolds and of $\Gamma$-fibred manifolds, where $\Gamma$ is a pseudogroup. The case when $\Gamma$ is the pseudogroup of all diffeomorphisms between open subsets of $\mathbb{R}^n$ recovers the ordinary notion of natural bundle.

Under suitable assumptions, natural $\Gamma$-bundles have finite order as well.

== Examples ==
An example of natural bundle (of first order) is the tangent bundle $TM$ of a manifold $M$.

Other examples include the cotangent bundles, the bundles of metrics of signature $(r,s)$ and the bundle of linear connections.
