= Frölicher–Nijenhuis bracket =

In mathematics, the Frölicher–Nijenhuis bracket is an extension of the Lie bracket of vector fields to vector-valued differential forms on a differentiable manifold.

It is useful in the study of connections, notably the Ehresmann connection, as well as in the more general study of projections in the tangent bundle. It was introduced by Alfred Frölicher and Albert Nijenhuis (1956) and is related to the work of Schouten (1940).

It is related to but not the same as the Nijenhuis–Richardson bracket and the Schouten–Nijenhuis bracket.

== Definition ==
Let Ω*(M) be the sheaf of exterior algebras of differential forms on a smooth manifold M. This is a graded algebra in which forms are graded by degree:

$$\Omega^*(M) = \bigoplus_{k=0}^\infty \Omega^k(M).$$

A graded derivation of degree ℓ is a mapping

$$D:\Omega^*(M)\to\Omega^{*+l}(M)$$

which is linear with respect to constants and satisfies

$$D(\alpha\wedge\beta) = D(\alpha)\wedge\beta + (-1)^{\ell\deg(\alpha)}\alpha\wedge D(\beta).$$

Thus, in particular, the interior product with a vector defines a graded derivation of degree ℓ = −1, whereas the exterior derivative is a graded derivation of degree ℓ = 1.

The vector space of all derivations of degree ℓ is denoted by Der_{ℓ}Ω*(M). The direct sum of these spaces is a graded vector space whose homogeneous components consist of all graded derivations of a given degree; it is denoted

$$\mathrm{Der}\, \Omega^*(M) = \bigoplus_{k=-\infty}^\infty \mathrm{Der}_k\, \Omega^*(M).$$

This forms a graded Lie superalgebra under the anticommutator of derivations defined on homogeneous derivations D_{1} and D_{2} of degrees d_{1} and d_{2}, respectively, by

$$[D_1,D_2] = D_1\circ D_2 - (-1)^{d_1d_2}D_2\circ D_1.$$

Any vector-valued differential form K in Ω^{k}(M, TM) with values in the tangent bundle of M defines a graded derivation of degree k − 1, denoted by i_{K}, and called the insertion operator. For ω ∈ Ω^{ℓ}(M),

$$i_K\,\omega(X_1,\dots,X_{k+\ell-1})=\frac{1}{k!(\ell-1)!}\sum_{\sigma\in{S}_{k+\ell-1}}\textrm{sign}\,\sigma \cdot
\omega(K(X_{\sigma(1)},\dots,X_{\sigma(k)}),X_{\sigma(k+1)},\dots,X_{\sigma(k+\ell-1)})$$

The Nijenhuis–Lie derivative along K ∈ Ω^{k}(M, TM) is defined by

$$\mathcal{L}_K = [i_K, d] =i_K\,{\circ}\,d-(-1)^{k-1} d\,{\circ}\, i_K$$

where d is the exterior derivative and i_{K} is the insertion operator.

The Frölicher–Nijenhuis bracket is defined to be the unique vector-valued differential form

$$[\cdot, \cdot]_{FN} : \Omega^k(M,\mathrm{T}M) \times \Omega^\ell(M,\mathrm{T}M) \to \Omega^{k+\ell}(M,\mathrm{T}M) : (K, L) \mapsto [K, L]_{FN}$$

such that

$$\mathcal{L}_{[K, L]_{FN}} = [\mathcal{L}_K, \mathcal{L}_L].$$

Hence,

$$[K, L]_{FN}=-(-1)^{kl}[L,K]_{FN}.$$

If k = 0, so that K ∈ Ω^{0}(M, TM) is a vector field, the usual homotopy formula for the Lie derivative is recovered

$$\mathcal{L}_K = [i_K,d] =i_K \,{\circ}\, d+d \,{\circ}\, i_K.$$

If k=ℓ=1, so that K,L ∈ Ω^{1}(M, TM), one has for any vector fields X and Y

$$[K, L]_{FN}(X,Y) = [KX, LY]+[LX, KY]+(KL+LK)[X,Y]-K([LX,Y]+[X, LY])-L([KX,Y]+[X, KY]).$$

If k=0 and ℓ=1, so that K=Z∈ Ω^{0}(M, TM) is a vector field and L ∈ Ω^{1}(M, TM), one has for any vector field X

$$[Z, L]_{FN}(X) = [Z, LX]-L[Z,X].$$

An explicit formula for the Frölicher–Nijenhuis bracket of $\phi\otimes X$ and $\psi\otimes Y$ (for forms φ and ψ and vector fields X and Y) is given by

$$\left.\right.[\phi \otimes X,\psi \otimes Y]_{FN} = \phi\wedge\psi\otimes [X,Y] + \phi\wedge\mathcal{L}_X \psi\otimes Y - \mathcal{L}_Y \phi\wedge\psi \otimes  X +(-1)^{\deg(\phi)}(d\phi \wedge i_X(\psi)\otimes Y +i_Y(\phi) \wedge d\psi \otimes X).$$

== Derivations of the ring of forms ==
Every derivation of Ω^{*}(M) can be written as

$$i_L + \mathcal{L}_K$$

for unique elements K and L of Ω^{*}(M, TM). The Lie bracket of these derivations is given as follows.

- The derivations of the form $\mathcal{L}_K$ form the Lie superalgebra of all derivations commuting with d. The bracket is given by

$$[\mathcal{L}_{K_1},\mathcal{L}_{K_2}]= \mathcal{L}_{[K_1,K_2]}$$

where the bracket on the right is the Frölicher–Nijenhuis bracket. In particular the Frölicher–Nijenhuis bracket defines a graded Lie algebra structure on $\Omega(M,\mathrm{T}M)$, which extends the Lie bracket of vector fields.

- The derivations of the form $i_L$ form the Lie superalgebra of all derivations vanishing on functions Ω^{0}(M). The bracket is given by

$$[i_{L_1},i_{L_2}]= i_{[L_1,L_2]^\land}$$

where the bracket on the right is the Nijenhuis–Richardson bracket.

- The bracket of derivations of different types is given by

$$[\mathcal{L}_{K}, i_L]= i_{[K,L]} - (-1)^{kl}\mathcal{L}_{i_LK}$$

for K in Ω^{k}(M, TM), L in Ω^{l+1}(M, TM).

== Applications ==
The Nijenhuis tensor of an almost complex structure J, is half the Frölicher–Nijenhuis bracket of J with itself. An almost complex structure is a complex structure if and only if the Nijenhuis tensor is zero.

With the Frölicher–Nijenhuis bracket it is possible to define the curvature and cocurvature of a vector-valued 1-form which is a projection. This generalizes the concept of the curvature of a connection.

There is a common generalization of the Schouten–Nijenhuis bracket and the Frölicher–Nijenhuis bracket; for details see the article on the Schouten–Nijenhuis bracket.
