= Bracketing (disambiguation) =

Bracketing may refer to:

== Social sciences ==
- Bracketing, a term in behavioral economics
- Bracketing in pharmaceutical validation is an approach in which the validation of extreme values of the tested samples is used to represent the validation of the whole gamut of values
- Bracketing (linguistics), a term in morphological analysis
  - Rebracketing, breaking a word into constituent parts inconsistent with its original etymology
- Center-squeeze, a situation in instant-runoff voting and plurality voting where a moderate candidate is defeated as a result of being "bracketed" by extremists

== Humanities, arts, and literature ==
- Bracketing, a photographic technique
  - Autobracketing, a camera feature for taking multiple shots with different settings
- Bracketing (phenomenology), a method used by phenomenological sociologists
- Inclusio, a literary device

== Other ==
- Bracketing, a method for determining range by firing artillery shells both beyond and short of a target (the term "straddling" is also used instead)
- Bracketing, the process of ordering multiple sizes of clothing online and then returning ones that don't fit
