= Nijenhuis–Richardson bracket =

Graded lie algebra structure

In mathematics, the algebraic bracket or Nijenhuis–Richardson bracket is a graded Lie algebra structure on the space of alternating multilinear forms of a vector space to itself, introduced by A. Nijenhuis and R. W. Richardson, Jr (1966, 1967). It is related to but not the same as the Frölicher–Nijenhuis bracket and the Schouten–Nijenhuis bracket.

== Definition ==
The primary motivation for introducing the bracket was to develop a uniform framework for discussing all possible Lie algebra structures on a vector space, and subsequently the deformations of these structures. If V is a vector space and p ≥ −1 is an integer, let

$$\operatorname{Alt}^p(V) = ({\bigwedge}^{p+1} V^*)\otimes V$$

be the space of all skew-symmetric (p + 1)-multilinear mappings of V to itself. The direct sum Alt(V) is a graded vector space. A Lie algebra structure on V is determined by a skew-symmetric bilinear map μ : V × V → V. That is to say, μ is an element of Alt^{1}(V). Furthermore, μ must obey the Jacobi identity. The Nijenhuis–Richardson bracket supplies a systematic manner for expressing this identity in the form [μ, μ] = 0.

In detail, the bracket is a bilinear bracket operation defined on Alt(V) as follows. On homogeneous elements P ∈ Alt^{p}(V) and Q ∈ Alt^{q}(V), the Nijenhuis–Richardson bracket [P, Q]^{∧} ∈ Alt^{p+q}(V) is given by

$$[P,Q]^\land = i_P Q - (-1)^{pq}i_Q P .$$

Here the interior product i_{P} is defined by

$$(i_P Q)(X_0,X_1,\ldots,X_{p+q}) = \sum_{\sigma\in \text{Sh}_{q+1,p}}\mathrm{sgn}(\sigma) P(Q(X_{\sigma(0)},X_{\sigma(1)},\ldots,X_{\sigma(q)}),X_{{\sigma(q+1)}},\ldots,X_{{\sigma(p+q)}})$$

where $\text{Sh}_{q+1,p}$ denotes (q+1, p)-shuffles of the indices, i.e. permutations $\sigma$ of $\{0,\ldots,p+q\}$ such that $\sigma(0) < \cdots < \sigma(q)$ and $\sigma(q+1) < \cdots < \sigma(p+q)$.

On non-homogeneous elements, the bracket is extended by bilinearity.

== Derivations of the ring of forms ==
The Nijenhuis–Richardson bracket can be defined on the vector valued forms Ω^{*}(M, T(M)) on a smooth manifold M in a similar way. Vector valued forms act as derivations on the supercommutative ring Ω^{*}(M) of forms on M by taking K to the derivation i_{K}, and the Nijenhuis–Richardson bracket then corresponds to the commutator of two derivations. This identifies Ω^{*}(M, T(M)) with the algebra of derivations that vanish on smooth functions. Not all derivations are of this form; for the structure of the full ring of all derivations see the article Frölicher–Nijenhuis bracket.

The Nijenhuis–Richardson bracket and the Frölicher–Nijenhuis bracket both make Ω^{*}(M, T(M)) into a graded superalgebra, but have different degrees.
