= Local parameter =

Algebraic concept

In the geometry of complex algebraic curves, a local parameter for a curve C at a smooth point P is a meromorphic function on C that has a simple zero at P. This concept can be generalized to curves defined over fields other than $\mathbb{C}$ (or schemes), because the local ring at a smooth point P of an algebraic curve C (defined over an algebraically closed field) is always a discrete valuation ring. This valuation will show a way to count the order (at the point P) of rational functions (which are natural generalizations for meromorphic functions in the non-complex realm) having a zero or a pole at P.

Local parameters, as its name indicates, are used mainly to properly count multiplicities in a local way.

== Introduction ==
If C is a complex algebraic curve, count multiplicities of zeroes and poles of meromorphic functions defined on it. However, when discussing curves defined over fields other than $\mathbb{C}$, if there is no access to the power of the complex analysis, a replacement must be found in order to define multiplicities of zeroes and poles of rational functions defined on such curves. In this last case, say that the germ of the regular function $f$ vanishes at $P\in C$ if $f\in m_P\subset\mathcal{O}_{C,P}$. This is in complete analogy with the complex case, in which the maximal ideal of the local ring at a point P is actually conformed by the germs of holomorphic functions vanishing at P.

The valuation function on $\mathcal{O}_{C,P}$ is given by

$$\operatorname{ord}_P(f)=\max\{d=0,1,2,\ldots: f\in m^d_P\};$$

This valuation can naturally be extended to K(C) (which is the field of rational functions of C) because it is the field of fractions of $\mathcal{O}_{C,P}$. Hence, the idea of having a simple zero at a point P is now complete: it will be a rational function $f\in K(C)$ such that its germ falls into $m_P^d$, with d at most 1.

This has an algebraic resemblance with the concept of a uniformizing parameter (or just uniformizer) found in the context of discrete valuation rings in commutative algebra; a uniformizing parameter for the DVR (R, m) is just a generator of the maximal ideal m. The link comes from the fact that a local parameter at P will be a uniformizing parameter for the DVR ($\mathcal{O}_{C,P}$, $m_P$), whence the name.

== Definition ==
Let C be an algebraic curve defined over an algebraically closed field K, and let K(C) be the field of rational functions of C. The valuation on K(C) corresponding to a smooth point $P\in C$ is defined as $\operatorname{ord}_P(f/g)=\operatorname{ord}_P(f)-\operatorname{ord}_P(g)$, where $\operatorname{ord}_P$ is the usual valuation on the local ring ($\mathcal{O}_{C,P}$, $m_P$). A local parameter for C at P is a function $t\in K(C)$ such that $\operatorname{ord}_P(t)=1$.
