= Albert Nijenhuis =

Dutch-American mathematician

- Born: November 21, 1926; Eindhoven, Netherlands
- Died: February 13, 2015 (aged 88)
- Citizenship: American
- Education: University of Amsterdam
- Known for: Natural bundle Nijenhuis tensor Nijenhuis–Richardson bracket Frölicher–Nijenhuis bracket Schouten–Nijenhuis bracket
- Awards: Guggenheim Fellowship (1961)
- Scientific career
- Fields: Mathematics
- Workplaces: University of Pennsylvania
- Doctoral advisor: Jan Arnoldus Schouten
- Doctoral students: Ebadollah S. Mahmoodian

Albert Nijenhuis (November 21, 1926 – February 13, 2015) was a Dutch-American mathematician who specialized in differential geometry and the theory of deformations in algebra and geometry, and later worked in combinatorics.

His high school studies at the gymnasium in Arnhem were interrupted by the evacuation of Arnhem by the Nazis after the failure of Operation Market Garden by the Allies. He continued his high school mathematical studies by himself on his grandparents’ farm, and then took state exams in 1945.

His university studies were carried out at the University of Amsterdam, where he received the degree of Candidaat (equivalent to a Bachelor of Science) in 1947, and a Doctorandus (equivalent to a Masters in Science) in 1950, cum laude. He was a Medewerker (associate) at the Mathematisch Centrum (now the Centrum Wiskunde & Informatica) in Amsterdam 1951–1952. He obtained a PhD in mathematics in 1952, cum laude (Theory of the geometric object). His thesis advisor was Jan Arnoldus Schouten.

He came to the United States in 1952 as a Fulbright fellow (1952–1953) at Princeton University. He then studied at the Institute for Advanced Study in Princeton, New Jersey 1953–1955, after which he spent a year as an Instructor in mathematics at the University of Chicago. He then moved to the University of Washington in Seattle, first as an assistant professor and then a professor of mathematics, departing in 1963 for the University of Pennsylvania, where he was a professor of mathematics until his retirement in 1987. He was a Fulbright Professor at the University of Amsterdam in 1963–1964, and a visiting professor at the University of Geneva in 1967–1968, and at Dartmouth College in 1977–1978. Following his retirement, he was a professor emeritus of the University of Pennsylvania and an Affiliate Professor at the University of Washington.

In 1958 he was an invited speaker at the International Mathematical Congress in Edinburgh. He was a J.S. Guggenheim Fellow in 1961–1962, again studying at the Institute for Advanced Study. In 1966 he became a correspondent member of the Royal Netherlands Academy of Arts and Sciences, and in 2012 he became a fellow of the American Mathematical Society.

== Career ==
His early work was in the area of differential geometry. He developed the Nijenhuis tensor in 1951, during his PhD studies at the University of Amsterdam. It was also during this time that he explored the properties of the Schouten-Nijenhuis bracket, although his work was not published until 1955. In a lecture at the American Mathematical Society Summer Institute in Differential Geometry (1956) in Seattle he was the first to mention deformations of complex structures and their exact relationship to cohomology.

With Alfred Frölicher, he developed the Frölicher-Nijenhuis bracket (1955). Further work in this area with Roger Richardson yielded the Nijenhuis–Richardson bracket (1964).

Soon thereafter his interests shifted to combinatorics. Much of his work was done with Herbert S. Wilf, with whom he published a book in 1975.

After retiring, his interest in differential geometry was rekindled. His last conference presentation and paper were presented when he was nearly 70.

== Personal life ==
Albert Nijenhuis became a U.S. citizen in 1959. He was married since 1955 and had four children. He died at the age of 88 after several months of failing health.

== Selected publications ==
- Nijenhuis, Albert; Richardson Jr., Roger W. (1966). "Cohomology and deformations in graded Lie algebras". Bulletin of the American Mathematical Society. 72 (1): 1–29. doi:10.1090/s0002-9904-1966-11401-5. MR 0195995.
- Nijenhuis, Albert (1972). Natural bundles and their general properties. Tokyo: Diff. Geom. in Honour of K. Yano. pp. 317–334.
- Nijenhuis, Albert; Wilf, Herbert S (1975). Combinatorial Algorithms. Academic Press. ISBN 0-12-519250-9.
- Nijenhuis, Albert; Wilf, Herbert S (1978). Combinatorial Algorithms for Computers and Calculators. Academic Press. ISBN 0-12-519260-6.
- Nijenhuis, Albert (1995). "Connection-free differential geometry". Diff. Geom. Appl., Proc. Conf.: 171–190.
