= Derivation (differential algebra) =

Algebraic generalization of the derivative

In mathematics, a derivation is a function on an algebra that generalizes certain features of the derivative operator. Specifically, given an algebra $A$ over a ring or a field $K$, a $K$-derivation is a $K$-linear map $D:A\to A$ that satisfies Leibniz's law:
$$D(ab) = a D(b) + D(a) b.$$
The same definition generalizes word-for-word whenever $M$ is an $A$-bimodule. The collection of all $K$-derivations of $A$ to itself is denoted by $\mathrm{Der}_K(A)$, and the collection of $K$-derivations of $A$ into an $A$-module $M$ is denoted by $\mathrm{Der}_K(A,M)$.

Derivations occur in many diverse areas of mathematics. The partial derivative with respect to a variable is an $\mathbb{R}$-derivation on the algebra of real-valued differentiable functions on $\mathbb{R}^n$. The Lie derivative with respect to a vector field is an $\mathbb{R}$-derivation on the algebra of differentiable functions on a differentiable manifold; more generally it is a derivation on the tensor algebra of a manifold. It follows that the adjoint representation of a Lie algebra is a derivation on that algebra. The Pincherle derivative is an example of a derivation in abstract algebra. An algebra $A$ equipped with a distinguished derivation $d$ forms a differential algebra, and is itself a significant object of study in areas such as differential Galois theory.

== Inner derivations ==
The commutator with respect to a fixed element $n\in A$ defines a linear endomorphism of $A$ to itself: $[\cdot,n]$. That map is a derivation over $K$, since the algebraic identity
$$[fg,n]=[f,n]g+f[g,n]\, ,$$
is precisely the Leibniz rule for $[\cdot,n]$. (The map is trivial — constant 0 — if $A$ is commmutative.) Such derivations are called inner derivations. In general, not all elements of $\mathrm{Der}_K(A)$ need be inner; the next term in the short exact sequence of Lie algebras is the level-1 Hochschild cohomology:
$$0\to Z(A)\to(A;[\cdot,\cdot])\to\mathrm{Der}(A)\to HH^1(A)\to0$$

== Properties ==
If $A$ is a $K$-algebra, for $K$ a ring, and D: $A$ → $A$ is a $K$-derivation, then

- If $A$ has a unit 1, then $D(1) = D(1^2) = 2D(1)$, so that $D(1) = 0$. Thus by $K$-linearity, $D(k) = 0$ for all $k\in K$.
- If $A$ is commutative, then $D(x^2) = xD(x) + D(x)x = 2xD(x)$, and $D(x^n) = nx^{n-1}D(x)$, by the Leibniz rule.
- More generally, for any $x_1, x_2, \ldots, x_n \in A$, it follows by induction that
  $$D(x_1x_2\cdots x_n) = \sum_i x_1\cdots x_{i-1}D(x_i)x_{i+1}\cdots x_n$$
  which is $\textstyle \sum_i D(x_i)\prod_{j\neq i}x_j$ if for all $i$, $D(x_i)$ commutes with $x_1,x_2,\ldots, x_{i-1}$.
- For $n > 1$, $D^n$ is not a derivation, instead satisfying a higher-order Leibniz rule:
  $$D^n(uv) = \sum_{k=0}^n \binom{n}{k} \cdot D^{n-k}(u)\cdot  D^k(v).$$
  Moreover, if $M$ is an $A$-bimodule, write
  $$\operatorname{Der}_K(A,M)$$
  for the set of $K$-derivations from $A$ to $M$.
- $\mathrm{Der}_K(A,M)$ is a module over $K$.
- $\mathrm{Der}_K(A)$ is a Lie algebra with Lie bracket defined by the commutator:
  $$[D_1,D_2] = D_1\circ D_2 - D_2\circ D_1.$$
  since it is readily verified that the commutator of two derivations is again a derivation.
- There is an $A$-module $\Omega_{A/K}$ (called the Kähler differentials) with a $K$-derivation $d:A\to\Omega_{A/K}$ through which any derivation $D:A\to M$ factors. That is, for any derivation $D$' there is a $A$-module map $\varphi$ with
  $$D: A\stackrel{d}{\longrightarrow} \Omega_{A/K}\stackrel{\varphi}{\longrightarrow} M.$$
  The correspondence $D\leftrightarrow \varphi$ is an isomorphism of $A$-modules:
  $$\operatorname{Der}_K(A,M)\simeq \operatorname{Hom}_{A}(\Omega_{A/K},M)$$
- If $k\subset K$ is a subring, then $A$ inherits a $k$-algebra structure, so there is an inclusion
  $$\operatorname{Der}_K(A,M)\subset \operatorname{Der}_k(A,M) ,$$
  since any $K$-derivation is a fortiori a $k$-derivation.

== Graded derivations ==
Given a graded algebra $A$ and a homogeneous linear map $D$ of grade $|D|$ on $A$, $D$ is a homogeneous derivation if
$${D(ab)=D(a)b+\varepsilon^{|a||D|}aD(b)}$$
for every homogeneous element $A$ and every element $b$ of $A$ for a commutator factor $\varepsilon = \pm 1$. A graded derivation is sum of homogeneous derivations with the same $\varepsilon$.

If $\varepsilon = 1$, this definition reduces to the usual case. If $\varepsilon = -1$, however, then
$${D(ab)=D(a)b+(-1)^{|a||D|}aD(b)}$$
for odd $|D|$, and $D$ is called an anti-derivation.

Examples of anti-derivations include the exterior derivative and the interior product acting on differential forms.

Graded derivations of superalgebras (i.e., $\mathbb{Z}_2$-graded algebras) are often called superderivations.

== Related notions ==
Hasse–Schmidt derivations are $K$-algebra homomorphisms
$$A \to A[[t]].$$

Composing further with the map that sends a formal power series $\sum a_n t^n$ to the coefficient $a_1$ gives a derivation.

== See also ==
- In differential geometry derivations are tangent vectors
- Kähler differential
- Hasse derivative
- p-derivation
- Wirtinger derivatives
- Derivative of the exponential map
