= Lie bracket of vector fields =

Operator in differential topology

In the mathematical field of differential topology, the Lie bracket of vector fields, also known as the Jacobi–Lie bracket or the commutator of vector fields, is an operator that assigns to any two vector fields $X$ and $Y$ on a smooth manifold $M$ a third vector field denoted $[X,Y]$.

Conceptually, the Lie bracket $[X,Y]$ is the derivative of $Y$ along the flow generated by $X$, and is sometimes denoted $\mathcal{L}_X Y$ ("Lie derivative of Y along X"). This generalizes to the Lie derivative of any tensor field along the flow generated by $X$.

The Lie bracket is an R-bilinear operation and turns the set of all smooth vector fields on the manifold $M$ into an (infinite-dimensional) Lie algebra.

The Lie bracket plays an important role in differential geometry and differential topology, for instance in the Frobenius integrability theorem, and is also fundamental in the geometric theory of nonlinear control systems.

V. I. Arnold refers to this as the "fisherman derivative", as one can imagine being a fisherman, holding a fishing rod, sitting in a boat. Both the boat and the float are flowing according to vector field $X$, and the fisherman lengthens/shrinks and turns the fishing rod according to vector field $Y$. The Lie bracket is the amount of dragging on the fishing float relative to the surrounding water.

== Definitions ==
There are three conceptually different but equivalent approaches to defining the Lie bracket:

=== Vector fields as derivations ===
Each smooth vector field $X : M \rightarrow TM$ on a manifold $M$ may be regarded as a differential operator acting on smooth functions $f(p)$ (where $p \in M$ and $f$ of class $C^\infty(M)$) when we define $X(f)$ to be another function whose value at a point $p$ is the directional derivative of $f$ at $p$ in the direction $X(p)$. In this way, each smooth vector field $X$ becomes a derivation on $C^{\infty}(M)$. Furthermore, any derivation on $C^{\infty}(M)$ arises from a unique smooth vector field $X$.

In general, the commutator $\delta_1\circ \delta_2 - \delta_2\circ\delta_1$ of any two derivations $\delta_1$ and $\delta_2$ is again a derivation, where $\circ$ denotes composition of operators. This can be used to define the Lie bracket as the vector field corresponding to the commutator derivation:

$$[X,Y](f) = X(Y(f))-Y(X(f)) \;\;\text{  for all } f\in C^\infty(M).$$

=== Flows and limits ===
Let $\Phi^X_t$ be the flow associated with the vector field $X$, and let $D$ denote the tangent map derivative operator. Then the Lie bracket of $X$ and $Y$ at the point $x\in M$ can be defined as the Lie derivative:

$$[X, Y]_x \ =\ (\mathcal{L}_X Y)_x \ :=\ \lim_{t \to 0}\frac{(\mathrm{D}\Phi^X_{-t}) Y_{\Phi^X_t(x)} \,-\, Y_x}t
\ =\
\left.\tfrac{\mathrm{d}}{\mathrm{d} t}\right|_{t=0} (\mathrm{D}\Phi^X_{-t}) Y_{\Phi^X_t(x)} .$$

This also measures the failure of the flow in the successive directions $X,Y,-X,-Y$ to return to the point $x$:

$$[X, Y]_x \ =\ \left.\tfrac12\tfrac{\mathrm{d}^2}{\mathrm{d}t^2}\right|_{t=0} (\Phi^Y_{-t} \circ \Phi^X_{-t} \circ \Phi^Y_{t} \circ \Phi^X_{t})(x)
\ =\  \left.\tfrac{\mathrm{d}}{\mathrm{d} t}\right|_{t=0} (\Phi^Y_{\!-\sqrt{t}} \circ \Phi^X_{\!-\sqrt{t}} \circ \Phi^Y_{\!\sqrt{t}} \circ \Phi^X_{\!\sqrt{t}})(x) .$$

=== In coordinates ===
Though the above definitions of Lie bracket are intrinsic (independent of the choice of coordinates on the manifold $M$), in practice one often wants to compute the bracket in terms of a specific coordinate system $\{ x^i \}$. We write $\partial_i = \tfrac{\partial}{\partial x^i}$ for the associated local basis of the tangent bundle, so that general vector fields can be written $\textstyle X=\sum_{i=1}^n X^i \partial_i$and $\textstyle Y=\sum_{i=1}^n Y^i \partial_i$for smooth functions $X^i, Y^i:M\to\mathbb{R}$. Then the Lie bracket can be computed as:

$$[X,Y] := \sum_{i=1}^n\left(X(Y^i) - Y(X^i)\right) \partial_i = \sum_{i=1}^n \sum_{j=1}^n \left(X^j \partial_j Y^i - Y^j \partial_j X^i \right) \partial_i .$$

If $M$ is (an open subset of) $\mathbb{R}^n$, then the vector fields $X$ and $Y$ can be written as smooth maps of the form $X:M\to\mathbb{R}^n$ and $Y:M\to\mathbb{R}^n$, and the Lie bracket $[X,Y]:M\to\mathbb{R}^n$ is given by:

$$[X,Y] := J_Y  X - J_X Y$$

where $J_Y$ and $J_X$ are $n\times n$ Jacobian matrices ($\partial_jY^i$ and $\partial_jX^i$ respectively using index notation) multiplying the $n\times 1$ column vectors $X$ and $Y$.

== Properties ==
The Lie bracket of vector fields equips the real vector space $V=\Gamma(TM)$ of all vector fields on $M$ (i.e., smooth sections of the tangent bundle $TM\to M$) with the structure of a Lie algebra, which means [ • , • ] is a map $V\times V\to V$ with:

- R-bilinearity
- Anti-symmetry, $[X, Y] = -[Y, X]$
- Jacobi identity, $[X, [Y, Z]] + [Z, [X, Y]] + [Y, [Z, X]] = 0 .$

An immediate consequence of the second property is that $[X, X] = 0$ for any $X$.

Furthermore, there is a "product rule" for Lie brackets. Given a smooth (scalar-valued) function $f$ on $M$ and a vector field $Y$ on $M$, we get a new vector field $fY$ by multiplying the vector $Y_x$ by the scalar $f(x)$ at each point $x\in M$. Then:

- $[X, fY] \ =\ X\!(f)\, Y \,+\, f\, [X,Y] ,$

where we multiply the scalar function $X(f)$ with the vector field $Y$, and the scalar function $f$ with the vector field $[X,Y]$. This turns the vector fields with the Lie bracket into a Lie algebroid.

Vanishing of the Lie bracket of $X$ and $Y$ means that following the flows in these directions defines a surface embedded in $M$, with $X$ and $Y$ as coordinate vector fields:

Theorem: $[X,Y]=0\,$ iff the flows of $X$ and $Y$ commute locally, meaning $(\Phi^Y_t \Phi^X_s) (x) =(\Phi^X_{s}\, \Phi^Y_t)(x)$ for all $x\in M$ and sufficiently small $s$, $t$.

This is a special case of the Frobenius integrability theorem.

== Examples ==
For a Lie group $G$, the corresponding Lie algebra $\mathfrak{g}$ is the tangent space at the identity $T_eG$, which can be identified with the vector space of left invariant vector fields on $G$. The Lie bracket of two left invariant vector fields is also left invariant, which defines the Jacobi–Lie bracket operation $[\,\cdot\,,\,\cdot\,]: \mathfrak g \times \mathfrak g\to \mathfrak g$.

For a matrix Lie group, whose elements are matrices $g \in G \subset M_{n\times n}(\mathbb{R})$, each tangent space can be represented as matrices: $T_{g}G = g\cdot T_I G \subset M_{n\times n}(\mathbb{R})$, where $\cdot$ means matrix multiplication and $I$ is the identity matrix. The invariant vector field corresponding to $X\in \mathfrak{g}=T_IG$ is given by $X_g = g\cdot X\in T_gG$, and a computation shows the Lie bracket on $\mathfrak g$ corresponds to the usual commutator of matrices:

$$[X,Y] \ =\ X\cdot Y - Y\cdot X .$$

== Generalizations ==
As mentioned above, the Lie derivative can be seen as a generalization of the Lie bracket. Another generalization of the Lie bracket (to vector-valued differential forms) is the Frölicher–Nijenhuis bracket.
