= Interior product =

Mapping from p forms to p-1 forms

In mathematics, the interior product (also known as interior derivative, interior multiplication, inner multiplication, inner derivative, insertion operator, contraction, or inner derivation) is a degree −1 (anti)derivation on the exterior algebra of differential forms on a smooth manifold. The interior product, named in opposition to the exterior product, should not be confused with an inner product. The interior product $\iota_X \omega$ is sometimes written, by geometers such as Michael Spivak, as $X \mathbin{\lrcorner} \omega.$ It may also be denoted $\omega \mathbin{\lfloor} X$, which is called the right contraction of $\omega$ with X.

== Definition ==
The interior product is defined to be the contraction of a differential form with a vector field. Thus if $X$ is a vector field on the manifold $M,$ then
$$\iota_X : \Omega^p(M) \to \Omega^{p-1}(M)$$
is the map which sends a $p$-form $\omega$ to the $(p - 1)$-form $\iota_X \omega$ defined by the property that
$$(\iota_X\omega)\left(X_1, \ldots, X_{p-1}\right) = \omega\left(X, X_1, \ldots, X_{p-1}\right)$$
for any vector fields $X_1, \ldots, X_{p-1}.$

When $\omega$ is a scalar field (0-form), $\iota_X \omega = 0$ by convention.

The interior product is the unique antiderivation of degree −1 on the exterior algebra such that on one-forms $\alpha$
$$\displaystyle\iota_X \alpha = \alpha(X) = \langle \alpha, X \rangle,$$
where $\langle \,\cdot, \cdot\, \rangle$ is the duality pairing between $\alpha$ and the vector $X.$ Explicitly, if $\alpha$ is a $p$-form and $\beta$ is a $q$-form, then
$$\iota_X(\alpha \wedge \beta) = \left(\iota_X\alpha\right) \wedge \beta + (-1)^p \alpha \wedge \left(\iota_X\beta\right).$$
The above relation says that the interior product obeys a graded Leibniz rule. An operation satisfying linearity and a Leibniz rule is called a derivation.

== Properties ==
If in local coordinates $(x_1, \ldots, x_n)$ the vector field $X$ is given by

$X = f_1 \frac{\partial}{\partial x_1} + \cdots + f_n \frac{\partial}{\partial x_n}$

then the interior product is given by
$$\iota_X (dx_1 \wedge \cdots \wedge dx_n) = \sum_{r=1}^{n}(-1)^{r-1}f_r dx_1 \wedge \cdots \wedge \widehat{dx_r} \wedge \cdots \wedge dx_n,$$
where $dx_1\wedge \cdots \wedge \widehat{dx_r} \wedge \cdots \wedge dx_n$ is the form obtained by omitting $dx_r$ from $dx_1 \wedge \cdots \wedge dx_n$.

By antisymmetry of forms,
$$\iota_X \iota_Y \omega = -\iota_Y \iota_X \omega,$$
and so $\iota_X \circ \iota_X = 0.$ This may be compared to the exterior derivative $d,$ which has the property $d \circ d = 0.$

The interior product with respect to the commutator of two vector fields $X,$ $Y$ satisfies the identity
$$\iota_{[X,Y]} = \left[\mathcal{L}_X, \iota_Y\right] = \left[\iota_X, \mathcal{L}_Y\right].$$
Proof. For any k-form $\Omega$,
$$\mathcal L_X(\iota_Y \Omega) - \iota_Y (\mathcal L_X\Omega) = (\mathcal L_X\Omega)(Y, -) + \Omega(\mathcal L_X Y, -) - (\mathcal L_X \Omega)(Y , -) = \iota_{\mathcal L_X Y}\Omega = \iota_{[X,Y]}\Omega$$
and similarly for the other result.

== Cartan identity ==
The interior product relates the exterior derivative and Lie derivative of differential forms by the Cartan formula (also known as the Cartan identity or Cartan homotopy formula):
$$\mathcal L_X\omega = d(\iota_X \omega) + \iota_X d\omega = \left\{ d, \iota_X \right\} \omega.$$

where the anticommutator was used. This identity defines a duality between the exterior and interior derivatives. Cartan's identity is important in symplectic geometry and general relativity: see momentum map. The Cartan homotopy formula is named after Élie Cartan.

Proof by direct computation

Since vector fields are locally integrable, we can always find a local coordinate system $(\xi^1, \dots, \xi^n)$ such that the vector field $X$ corresponds to the partial derivative with respect to the first coordinate, i.e., $X = \partial_1$. (See Straightening theorem for vector fields)

By linearity of the interior product, exterior derivative, and Lie derivative, it suffices to prove the Cartan's magic formula for monomial $k$-forms. There are only two cases:

Case 1: $\alpha = a \, d\xi^1 \wedge d\xi^2 \wedge \dots \wedge d\xi^k$. Direct computation yields:
$$\begin{aligned}
\iota_X \alpha &= a \, d\xi^2 \wedge \dots \wedge d\xi^k, \\
d(\iota_X \alpha) &= (\partial_1 a) \, d\xi^1 \wedge d\xi^2 \wedge \dots \wedge d\xi^k + \sum_{i=k+1}^n (\partial_i a) \, d\xi^i \wedge d\xi^2 \wedge \dots \wedge d\xi^k, \\
d\alpha &= \sum_{i=k+1}^n (\partial_i a) \, d\xi^i \wedge d\xi^1 \wedge d\xi^2 \wedge \dots \wedge d\xi^k, \\
\iota_X(d\alpha) &= -\sum_{i=k+1}^n (\partial_i a) \, d\xi^i \wedge d\xi^2 \wedge \dots \wedge d\xi^k, \\
L_X\alpha &= (\partial_1 a) \, d\xi^1 \wedge d\xi^2 \wedge \dots \wedge d\xi^k.
\end{aligned}$$

Case 2: $\alpha = a \, d\xi^2 \wedge d\xi^3 \wedge \dots \wedge d\xi^{k+1}$. Direct computation yields:
$$\begin{aligned}
\iota_X \alpha &= 0, \\
d\alpha &= (\partial_1 a) \, d\xi^1 \wedge d\xi^2 \wedge \dots \wedge d\xi^{k+1} + \sum_{i=k+2}^n (\partial_i a) \, d\xi^i \wedge d\xi^2 \wedge \dots \wedge d\xi^{k+1}, \\
\iota_X(d\alpha) &= (\partial_1 a) \, d\xi^2 \wedge \dots \wedge d\xi^{k+1}, \\
L_X\alpha &= (\partial_1 a) \, d\xi^2 \wedge \dots \wedge d\xi^{k+1}.
\end{aligned}$$

Proof by abstract algebra, credited to Shiing-Shen Chern

The exterior derivative $d$ is an anti-derivation on the exterior algebra. Similarly, the interior product $\iota_X$ with a vector field $X$ is also an anti-derivation. On the other hand, the Lie derivative $L_X$ is a derivation.

The anti-commutator of two anti-derivations is a derivation.

To show that two derivations on the exterior algebra are equal, it suffices to show that they agree on a set of generators. Locally, the exterior algebra is generated by 0-forms (smooth functions $f$) and their differentials, exact 1-forms ($df$). Verify Cartan's magic formula on these two cases.

== In Exterior Algebra ==
In the exterior algebra over a vector space V, the interior product is generalized for arbitrary multivectors a and b. The right interior product, or right contraction, $\textstyle \mathbin{\lfloor} : \bigwedge V \times \bigwedge V \to \bigwedge V$ is defined as

$$a \mathbin{\lfloor} b = a \vee b^\bigstar,$$

where $\vee$ is the exterior antiproduct (also known as the regressive product), and the superscript $\bigstar$ denotes the Hodge dual. Similarly, the left interior product, or left contraction, $\rfloor$ is defined as

$$a \mathbin{\rfloor} b = a_\bigstar \vee b,$$

where the subscript $\bigstar$ denotes the left version of the Hodge dual.

When a and b are homogeneous multivectors with the same grade, then the left and right interior products each reduce to the inner product such that

$$a \mathbin{\lfloor} b = a \mathbin{\rfloor} b = a \cdot b.$$

For a vector X (which has grade 1), a homogeneous multivector a having grade p, and an arbitrary multivector b, the right interior product satisfies the rule

$$(a \wedge b) \mathbin{\lfloor} X = (a \mathbin{\lfloor} X) \wedge b + (-1)^p a \wedge (b \mathbin{\lfloor} X).$$

This is the exact analog of the Leibniz product rule given for the operator $\iota_X$ above.

== See also ==
- Cap product – Method in algebraic topology
- Inner product – Vector space with generalized dot product
- Tensor contraction – Operation in mathematics
