= Locally nilpotent derivation =

In mathematics, a derivation $\partial$ of a commutative ring $A$ is called a locally nilpotent derivation (LND) if every element of $A$ is annihilated by some power of $\partial$.

One motivation for the study of locally nilpotent derivations comes from the fact that some of the counterexamples to Hilbert's 14th problem are obtained as the kernels of a derivation on a polynomial ring.

Over a field $k$ of characteristic zero, to give a locally nilpotent derivation on the integral domain $A$, finitely generated over the field, is equivalent to giving an action of the additive group $(k,+)$ to the affine variety $X = \operatorname{Spec}(A)$. Roughly speaking, an affine variety admitting "plenty" of actions of the additive group is considered similar to an affine space.

== Definition ==
Let $A$ be a ring. Recall that a derivation of $A$ is a map $\partial\colon\, A\to A$ satisfying the Leibniz rule $\partial (ab)=(\partial a)b+a(\partial b)$ for any $a,b\in A$. If $A$ is an algebra over a field $k$, we additionally require $\partial$ to be $k$-linear, so $k\subseteq \ker \partial$.

A derivation $\partial$ is called a locally nilpotent derivation (LND) if for every $a \in A$, there exists a positive integer $n$ such that $\partial^{n}(a)=0$.

If $A$ is graded, we say that a locally nilpotent derivation $\partial$ is homogeneous (of degree $d$) if $\deg \partial a=\deg a +d$ for every $a\in A$.

The set of locally nilpotent derivations of a ring $A$ is denoted by $\operatorname{LND}(A)$. Note that this set has no obvious structure: it is neither closed under addition (e.g. if $\partial_{1}=y\tfrac{\partial}{\partial x}$, $\partial_{2}=x\tfrac{\partial}{\partial y}$ then $\partial_{1},\partial_{2}\in \operatorname{LND}(k[x,y])$ but $(\partial_{1}+\partial_{2})^{2}(x)=x$, so $\partial_{1}+\partial_{2}\not\in \operatorname{LND}(k[x,y])$) nor under multiplication by elements of $A$ (e.g. $\tfrac{\partial}{\partial x}\in \operatorname{LND}(k[x])$, but $x\tfrac{\partial}{\partial x}\not\in\operatorname{LND}(k[x])$). However, if $[\partial_{1},\partial_{2}]=0$ then $\partial_{1},\partial_{2}\in \operatorname{LND}(A)$ implies $\partial_{1}+\partial_{2}\in \operatorname{LND}(A)$ and if $\partial\in \operatorname{LND}(A)$, $h\in\ker\partial$ then $h\partial\in \operatorname{LND}(A)$.

== Relation to G_{a}-actions ==
Let $A$ be an algebra over a field $k$ of characteristic zero (e.g. $k=\mathbb{C}$). Then there is a one-to-one correspondence between the locally nilpotent $k$-derivations on $A$ and the actions of the additive group $\mathbb{G}_{a}$ of $k$ on the affine variety $\operatorname{Spec} A$, as follows. A $\mathbb{G}_{a}$-action on $\operatorname{Spec} A$ corresponds to a $k$-algebra homomorphism $\rho\colon A\to A[t]$. Any such $\rho$ determines a locally nilpotent derivation $\partial$ of $A$ by taking its derivative at zero, namely $\partial=\epsilon \circ \tfrac{d}{dt}\circ \rho,$ where $\epsilon$ denotes the evaluation at $t=0$. Conversely, any locally nilpotent derivation $\partial$ determines a homomorphism $\rho\colon A\to A[t]$ by $\rho = \exp (t\partial)=\sum_{n=0}^{\infty}\frac{t^{n}}{n!}\partial^{n}.$

It is easy to see that the conjugate actions correspond to conjugate derivations, i.e. if $\alpha\in \operatorname{Aut} A$ and $\partial\in \operatorname{LND}(A)$ then $\alpha\circ\partial \circ \alpha^{-1}\in \operatorname{LND}(A)$ and $\exp(t\cdot \alpha\circ\partial \circ \alpha^{-1})=\alpha \circ \exp(t\partial)\circ \alpha^{-1}$

== The kernel algorithm ==
The algebra $\ker \partial$ consists of the invariants of the corresponding $\mathbb{G}_{a}$-action. It is algebraically and factorially closed in $A$. A special case of Hilbert's 14th problem asks whether $\ker \partial$ is finitely generated, or, if $A=k[X]$, whether the quotient $X/\!/\mathbb{G}_{a}$ is affine. By Zariski's finiteness theorem, it is true if $\dim X\leq 3$. On the other hand, this question is highly nontrivial even for $X=\mathbb{C}^{n}$, $n\geq 4$. For $n\geq 5$ the answer, in general, is negative. The case $n=4$ is open.

However, in practice it often happens that $\ker\partial$ is known to be finitely generated: notably, by the Maurer–Weitzenböck theorem, it is the case for linear LND's of the polynomial algebra over a field of characteristic zero (by linear we mean homogeneous of degree zero with respect to the standard grading).

Assume $\ker \partial$ is finitely generated. If $A=k[g_1,\dots, g_n]$ is a finitely generated algebra over a field of characteristic zero, then $\ker\partial$ can be computed using van den Essen's algorithm, as follows. Choose a local slice, i.e. an element $r\in \ker \partial^{2}\setminus \ker \partial$ and put $f=\partial r\in \ker\partial$. Let $\pi_{r}\colon\, A\to (\ker \partial)_{f}$ be the Dixmier map given by $\pi_{r}(a)=\sum_{n=0}^{\infty}\frac{(-1)^{n}}{n!}\partial^{n}(a)\frac{r^{n}}{f^{n}}$. Now for every $i=1,\dots, n$, chose a minimal integer $m_{i}$ such that $h_{i}\colon = f^{m_{i}}\pi_{r}(g_{i})\in \ker\partial$, put $B_{0}=k[h_{1},\dots, h_{n},f]\subseteq \ker \partial$, and define inductively $B_{i}$ to be the subring of $A$ generated by $\{h\in A: fh\in B_{i-1}\}$. By induction, one proves that $B_{0}\subset B_{1}\subset \dots \subset\ker \partial$ are finitely generated and if $B_{i}=B_{i+1}$ then $B_{i}=\ker \partial$, so $B_{N}=\ker \partial$ for some $N$. Finding the generators of each $B_{i}$ and checking whether $B_{i}=B_{i+1}$ is a standard computation using Gröbner bases.

== Slice theorem ==
Assume that $\partial\in\operatorname{LND}(A)$ admits a slice, i.e. $s\in A$ such that $\partial s=1$. The slice theorem asserts that $A$ is a polynomial algebra $(\ker\partial) [s]$ and $\partial=\tfrac{d}{ds}$.

For any local slice $r\in\ker\partial \setminus \ker\partial^{2}$ we can apply the slice theorem to the localization $A_{\partial r}$, and thus obtain that $A$ is locally a polynomial algebra with a standard derivation. In geometric terms, if a geometric quotient $\pi\colon\,X\to X//\mathbb{G}_{a}$ is affine (e.g. when $\dim X\leq 3$ by the Zariski theorem), then it has a Zariski-open subset $U$ such that $\pi^{-1}(U)$ is isomorphic over $U$ to $U\times \mathbb{A}^{1}$, where $\mathbb{G}_{a}$ acts by translation on the second factor.

However, in general it is not true that $X\to X//\mathbb{G}_{a}$ is locally trivial. For example, let $\partial=u\tfrac{\partial}{\partial x}+v\tfrac{\partial}{\partial y}+(1+uy^2)\tfrac{\partial}{\partial z}\in \operatorname{LND}(\mathbb{C}[x,y,z,u,v])$. Then $\ker\partial$ is a coordinate ring of a singular variety, and the fibers of the quotient map over singular points are two-dimensional.

If $\dim X=3$ then $\Gamma=X\setminus U$ is a curve. To describe the $\mathbb{G}_{a}$-action, it is important to understand the geometry $\Gamma$. Assume further that $k=\mathbb{C}$ and that $X$ is smooth and contractible (in which case $S$ is smooth and contractible as well) and choose $\Gamma$ to be minimal (with respect to inclusion). Then Kaliman proved that each irreducible component of $\Gamma$ is a polynomial curve, i.e. its normalization is isomorphic to $\mathbb{C}^{1}$. The curve $\Gamma$ for the action given by Freudenburg's (2,5)-derivation (see below) is a union of two lines in $\mathbb{C}^{2}$, so $\Gamma$ may not be irreducible. However, it is conjectured that $\Gamma$ is always contractible.

== Examples ==
=== Example 1 ===
The standard coordinate derivations $\tfrac{\partial}{\partial x_i}$ of a polynomial algebra $k[x_1,\dots, x_n]$ are locally nilpotent. The corresponding $\mathbb{G}_a$-actions are translations: $t\cdot x_{i}=x_{i}+t$, $t\cdot x_{j}=x_{j}$ for $j\neq i$.

=== Example 2 (Freudenburg's (2,5)-homogeneous derivation) ===
Let $f_1=x_1x_3-x_2^2$, $f_2=x_3f_1^2+2x_1^2x_2f_1+x^5$, and let $\partial$ be the Jacobian derivation $\partial(f_{3})=\det \left[\tfrac{\partial f_{i}}{\partial x_{j}}\right]_{i,j=1,2,3}$. Then $\partial\in \operatorname{LND}(k[x_1,x_2,x_3])$ and $\operatorname{rank}\partial=3$ (see below); that is, $\partial$ annihilates no variable. The fixed point set of the corresponding $\mathbb{G}_{a}$-action equals $\{x_1=x_2=0\}$.

=== Example 3 ===
Consider $Sl_2(k)=\{ad-bc=1\}\subseteq k^{4}$. The locally nilpotent derivation $a\tfrac{\partial}{\partial b}+c\tfrac{\partial}{\partial d}$ of its coordinate ring corresponds to a natural action of $\mathbb{G}_a$ on $Sl_2(k)$ via right multiplication of upper triangular matrices. This action gives a nontrivial $\mathbb{G}_a$-bundle over $\mathbb{A}^{2}\setminus \{(0,0)\}$. However, if $k=\mathbb{C}$ then this bundle is trivial in the smooth category

== LND's of the polynomial algebra ==
Let $k$ be a field of characteristic zero (using Kambayashi's theorem one can reduce most results to the case $k=\mathbb{C}$) and let $A=k[x_1,\dots, x_n]$ be a polynomial algebra.

=== n = 2 (G_{a}-actions on an affine plane) ===
Rentschler's theorem—Every LND of $k[x_1,x_2]$ can be conjugated to $f(x_1)\tfrac{\partial}{\partial x_2}$ for some $f(x_1)\in k[x_1]$. This result is closely related to the fact that every automorphism of an affine plane is tame, and does not hold in higher dimensions.

=== n = 3 (G_{a}-actions on an affine 3-space) ===
Miyanishi's theorem—The kernel of every nontrivial LND of $A=k[x_1,x_2,x_3]$ is isomorphic to a polynomial ring in two variables; that is, a fixed point set of every nontrivial $\mathbb{G}_{a}$-action on $\mathbb{A}^{3}$ is isomorphic to $\mathbb{A}^{2}$.

In other words, for every $0\neq \partial \in \operatorname{LND}(A)$ there exist $f_{1},f_{2}\in A$ such that $\ker\partial=k[f_{1},f_{2}]$ (but, in contrast to the case $n=2$, $A$ is not necessarily a polynomial ring over $\ker \partial$). In this case, $\partial$ is a Jacobian derivation: $\partial(f_{3}) = \det\left[\tfrac{\partial f_{i}}{\partial x_{j}}\right]_{i,j=1,2,3}$.

Zurkowski's theorem—Assume that $n=3$ and $\partial\in \operatorname{LND}(A)$ is homogeneous relative to some positive grading of $A$ such that $x_1,x_2,x_3$ are homogeneous. Then $\ker\partial=k[f,g]$ for some homogeneous $f,g$. Moreover, if $\deg x_{1},\deg x_{2},\deg x_{3}$ are relatively prime, then $\deg f,\deg g$ are relatively prime as well.

Bonnet's theorem—A quotient morphism $\mathbb{A}^{3}\to \mathbb{A}^{2}$ of a $\mathbb{G}_{a}$-action is surjective. In other words, for every $0\neq \partial \in \operatorname{LND}(A)$, the embedding $\ker\partial\subseteq A$ induces a surjective morphism $\operatorname{Spec}A\to \operatorname{Spec}\ker\partial$.

This is no longer true for $n\geqslant 4$, e.g. the image of a quotient map $\mathbb{A}^{4}\to\mathbb{A}^{3}$ by a $\mathbb{G}_{a}$-action $t\cdot (x_1,x_2,x_3,x_4)=(x_1,x_2,x_3-tx_2,x_4+tx_1)$ (which corresponds to a LND given by $x_1\tfrac{\partial}{\partial x_4}-x_2\tfrac{\partial}{\partial x_3})$ equals $\mathbb{A}^{3}\setminus \{(x_1,x_2,x_3): x_{1}=x_{2}=0,x_{3}\neq 0\}$.

Kaliman's theorem—Every fixed-point free action of $\mathbb{G}_{a}$ on $\mathbb{A}^{3}$ is conjugate to a translation. In other words, every $\partial \in \operatorname{LND}(A)$ such that the image of $\partial$ generates the unit ideal (or, equivalently, $\partial$ defines a nowhere vanishing vector field), admits a slice. This results answers one of the conjectures from Kraft's list.

Again, this result is not true for $n\geqslant 4$: e.g. consider the $x_1\tfrac{\partial}{\partial x_2}+ x_2\tfrac{\partial}{\partial x_3}+(x_2^2-2x_1 x_3-1)\tfrac{\partial}{\partial x_{4}}\in \operatorname{LND}(\mathbb{C}[x_{1},x_{2},x_{3},x_{4}])$. The points $(x_1,1,0,0)$ and $(x_1,-1,0,0)$ are in the same orbit of the corresponding $\mathbb{G}_a$-action if and only if $x_{1}\neq 0$; hence the (topological) quotient is not even Hausdorff, let alone homeomorphic to $\mathbb{C}^{3}$.

Principal ideal theorem—Let $\partial\in\operatorname{LND}(A)$. Then $A$ is faithfully flat over $\ker\partial$. Moreover, the ideal $\ker \partial \cap \operatorname{im}\partial$ is principal in $A$.

=== Triangular derivations ===
Let $f_1,\dots,f_n$ be any system of variables of $A$; that is, $A=k[f_1,\dots, f_n]$. A derivation of $A$ is called triangular with respect to this system of variables, if $\partial f_1\in k$ and $\partial f_{i} \in k[f_1,\dots,f_{i-1}]$ for $i=2,\dots,n$. A derivation is called triangulable if it is conjugate to a triangular one, or, equivalently, if it is triangular with respect to some system of variables. Every triangular derivation is locally nilpotent. The converse is true for $\leq 2$ by Rentschler's theorem above, but it is not true for $n\geq 3$.

Bass's example

The derivation of $k[x_1,x_2,x_3]$ given by $x_1\tfrac{\partial}{\partial x_2}+2x_2x_1\tfrac{\partial}{\partial x_3}$ is not triangulable. Indeed, the fixed-point set of the corresponding $\mathbb{G}_{a}$-action is a quadric cone $x_2x_3=x_2^2$, while by the result of Popov, a fixed point set of a triangulable $\mathbb{G}_{a}$-action is isomorphic to $Z\times \mathbb{A}^{1}$ for some affine variety $Z$; and thus cannot have an isolated singularity.

Freudenburg's theorem—The above necessary geometrical condition was later generalized by Freudenburg. To state his result, we need the following definition:

A corank of $\partial\in \operatorname{LND}(A)$ is a maximal number $j$ such that there exists a system of variables $f_1,\dots, f_n$ such that $f_1,\dots, f_j\in\ker\partial$. Define $\operatorname{rank}\partial$ as $n$ minus the corank of $\partial$.

We have $1\leq \operatorname{rank}\partial \leq n$ and $\operatorname{rank}(\partial)=1$ if and only if in some coordinates, $\partial=h\tfrac{\partial}{\partial x_{n}}$ for some $h\in k[x_1,\dots,x_{n-1}]$.

Theorem: If $\partial\in \operatorname{LND}(A)$ is triangulable, then any hypersurface contained in the fixed-point set of the corresponding $\mathbb{G}_{a}$-action is isomorphic to $Z\times \mathbb{A}^{\operatorname{rank} \partial}$.

In particular, LND's of maximal rank $n$ cannot be triangulable. Such derivations do exist for $n\geq 3$: the first example is the (2,5)-homogeneous derivation (see above), and it can be easily generalized to any $n\geq 3$.

== Makar-Limanov invariant ==
The intersection of the kernels of all locally nilpotent derivations of the coordinate ring, or, equivalently, the ring of invariants of all $\mathbb{G}_{a}$-actions, is called Makar-Limanov invariant and is an important algebraic invariant of an affine variety. For example, it is trivial for an affine space; but for the Koras–Russell cubic threefold, which is diffeomorphic to $\mathbb{C}^{3}$, it is not.
