= Hilbert basis =

Hilbert basis may refer to

- In Invariant theory, a finite set of invariant polynomials, such that every invariant polynomial may be written as a polynomial function of these basis elements
- Orthonormal basis of a Hilbert space
- Hilbert basis (linear programming)
- Hilbert's basis theorem
