= Covariant (invariant theory) =

In invariant theory, a branch of algebra, given a group G, a covariant is a G-equivariant polynomial map $V \to W$ between linear representations V, W of G. It is a generalization of a classical convariant, which is a homogeneous polynomial map from the space of binary m-forms to the space of binary p-forms (over the complex numbers) that is $SL_2(\mathbb{C})$-equivariant.

== See also ==
- Module of covariants
- Invariant of a binary form § Terminology
- Transvectant – method/process of constructing covariants
