= Stability (algebraic geometry) =

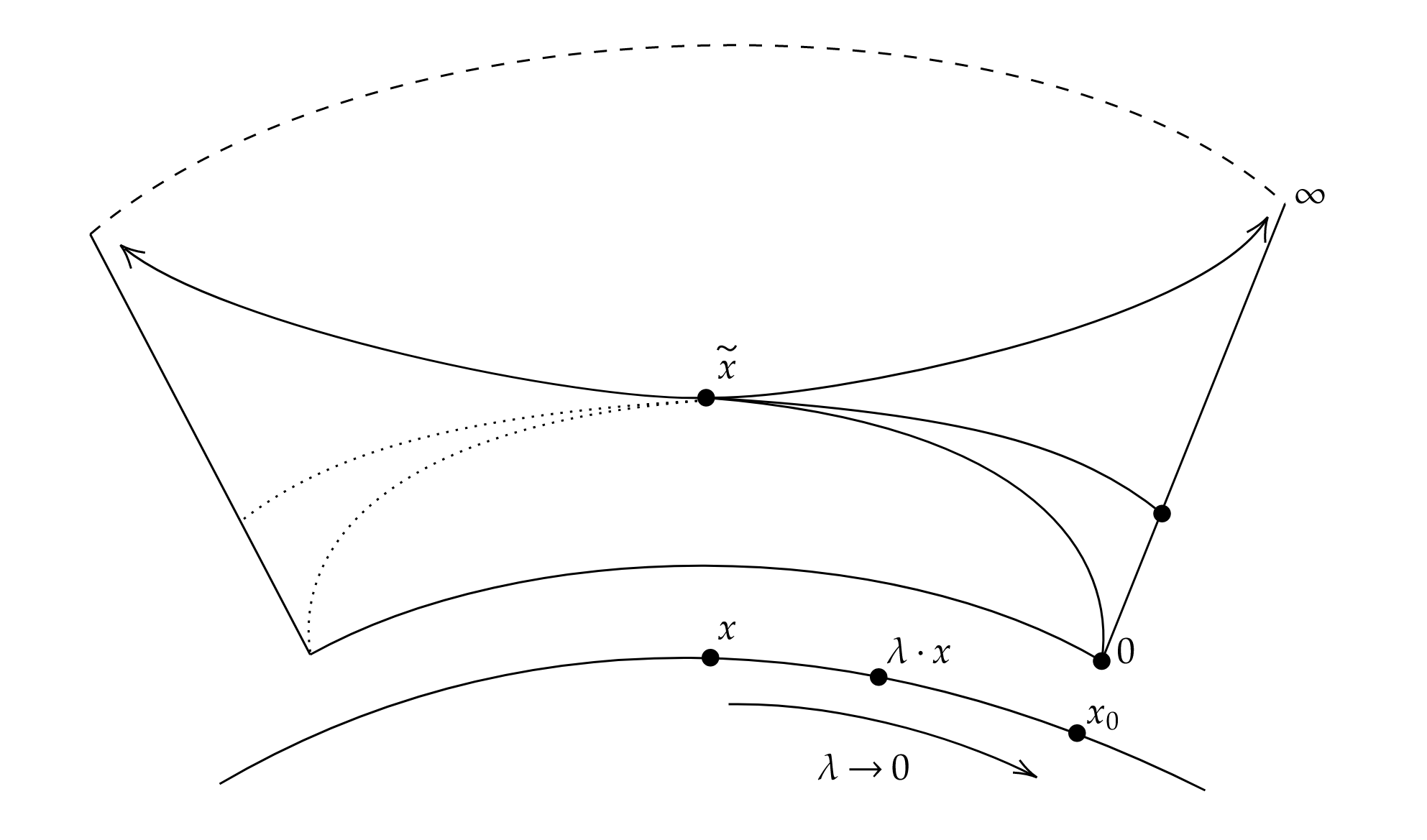
In the Hilbert–Mumford criterion which characterises stable points in geometric invariant theory, the trajectory of $\tilde{x}$ is looked at along the flow of a group action by $\lambda \in \mathbb{C}^*$ as $\lambda \to 0$ or equivalently as $\lambda \to \infty$. When the flow goes off to infinity, the point $\tilde{x}$ is in stable equilibrium at the bottom of the curve. When the curve goes down to zero the point is unstable, and will flow down to zero along the action of $\lambda$. When the flow stays between zero and infinity, the point is in an unstable equilibrium (semi-stable). This analogy with mechanical equilibrium motivates the terminology of stability and instability.

In mathematics, and especially algebraic geometry, stability is a notion which characterises when a geometric object, for example a point, an algebraic variety, a vector bundle, or a sheaf, has some desirable properties for the purpose of classifying them. The exact characterisation of what it means to be stable depends on the type of geometric object, but all such examples share the property of having a minimal amount of internal symmetry, that is such stable objects have few automorphisms. This is related to the concept of simplicity in mathematics, which measures when some mathematical object has few subobjects inside it (see for example simple groups, which have no non-trivial normal subgroups). In addition to stability, some objects may be described with terms such as semi-stable (having a small but not minimal amount of symmetry), polystable (being made out of stable objects), or unstable (having too much symmetry, the opposite of stable).

== Background ==
In many areas of mathematics, and indeed within geometry itself, it is often very desirable to have highly symmetric objects, and these objects are often regarded as aesthetically pleasing. However, high amounts of symmetry are not desirable when one is attempting to classify geometric objects by constructing moduli spaces of them, because the symmetries of these objects cause the formation of singularities, and obstruct the existence of universal families.

The concept of stability was first introduced in its modern form by David Mumford in 1965 in the context of geometric invariant theory, a theory which explains how to take quotients of algebraic varieties by group actions, and obtain a quotient space that is still an algebraic variety, a so-called categorical quotient. However the ideas behind Mumford's work go back to the invariant theory of David Hilbert in 1893, and the fundamental concepts involved date back even to the work of Bernhard Riemann on constructing moduli spaces of Riemann surfaces. Since the work of Mumford, stability has appeared in many forms throughout algebraic geometry, often with various notions of stability either derived from geometric invariant theory, or inspired by it. A completely general theory of stability does not exist (although one attempt to form such a theory is Bridgeland stability), and this article serves to summarise and compare the different manifestations of stability in geometry and the relations between them.

In addition to its use in classification and forming quotients in algebraic geometry, stability also finds significant use in differential geometry and geometric analysis, due to the general principle which states that stable algebraic geometric objects correspond to extremal differential geometric objects. Here extremal is generally meant in the sense of the calculus of variations, in that such objects minimize some functional. The prototypical example of this principle is the Kempf–Ness theorem, which relates GIT quotients to symplectic quotients by showing that stable points minimize the energy functional of the moment map. Due to this general principle, stability has found use as a key tool in constructing the existence of solutions to many important partial differential equations in geometry, such as the Yang–Mills equations and the Kähler–Einstein equations. More examples of this correspondence in action include Kobayashi–Hitchin correspondence, the nonabelian Hodge correspondence, the Yau–Tian–Donaldson conjecture for Kähler–Einstein manifolds, and even the uniformization theorem.

== Stability conditions ==
- Gieseker stability
- Slope stability
- Bridgeland stability
- K-stability
