= Fixed-point subring =

In algebra, the fixed-point subring $R^f$ of an automorphism f of a ring R is the subring of the fixed points of f, that is,

$$R^f = \{ r \in R \mid f(r) = r \}.$$

More generally, if G is a group acting on R, then the subring of R

$$R^G = \{ r \in R \mid g \cdot r = r \ \text{ for all } \ g \in G \}$$

is called the fixed subring or, more traditionally, the ring of invariants under G. If S is a set of automorphisms of R, the elements of R that are fixed by the elements of S form the ring of invariants under the group generated by S. In particular, the fixed-point subring of an automorphism f is the ring of invariants of the cyclic group generated by f.

In Galois theory, when R is a field and G is a group of field automorphisms, the fixed ring is a subfield called the fixed field of the automorphism group; see Fundamental theorem of Galois theory.

Along with a module of covariants, the ring of invariants is a central object of study in invariant theory. Geometrically, the rings of invariants are the coordinate rings of (affine or projective) GIT quotients and they play fundamental roles in the constructions in geometric invariant theory.

Example: Let $R = k[x_1, \dots, x_n]$ be a polynomial ring in n variables. The symmetric group S_{n} acts on R by permuting the variables. Then the ring of invariants $R^G = k[x_1, \dots, x_n]^{\operatorname{S}_n}$ is the ring of symmetric polynomials. If a reductive algebraic group G acts on R, then the fundamental theorem of invariant theory describes the generators of R^{G}.

Hilbert's fourteenth problem asks whether the ring of invariants is finitely generated or not (the answer is affirmative if G is a reductive algebraic group by Nagata's theorem.) The finite generation is easily seen for a finite group G acting on a finitely generated algebra R: since R is integral over R^{G}, the Artin–Tate lemma implies R^{G} is a finitely generated algebra. The answer is negative for some unipotent groups.

Let G be a finite group. Let S be the symmetric algebra of a finite-dimensional G-module. Then G is a reflection group if and only if $S$ is a free module (of finite rank) over S^{G} (Chevalley's theorem).

In differential geometry, if G is a Lie group and $\mathfrak{g} = \operatorname{Lie}(G)$ its Lie algebra, then each principal G-bundle on a manifold M determines a graded algebra homomorphism (called the Chern–Weil homomorphism)

$$\mathbb{C}[\mathfrak{g}]^G \to \operatorname{H}^{2*}(M; \mathbb{C})$$

where $\mathbb{C}[\mathfrak{g}]$ is the ring of polynomial functions on $\mathfrak{g}$ and G acts on $\mathbb{C}[\mathfrak{g}]$ by adjoint representation.

== See also ==
- Character variety
