= John Blissard =

English mathematician, educator, and vicar

John Blissard (23 May 1803 – 10 December 1875) was a Church of England vicar, educator, and mathematician who invented what came to be known as the umbral calculus. Although he never held a university post, Blissard was an active mathematician, especially during the 1860s when he was in his late fifties and early sixties. He published mostly in the Cambridge-based Quarterly Journal of Pure and Applied Mathematics.

== Life ==
Blissard was born in Northampton, England in 1803, the son of a physician. He entered St John's College, Cambridge in 1822, the recipient of a Mount Stephen exhibition. Blissard received the B. A. in 1826 and finished 10th Senior Optime in the 1826 Cambridge Mathematical Tripos, which corresponds to second-class honours, a step below Wrangler. In his sketch of Blissard's life, E. T. Bell writes, "His rank in the tripos, however, was not a just measure of his mathematical ability, as he had already done what would now be called independent research as an undergraduate."

He was ordained as deacon in 1827 and priest in 1828. Blissard was appointed curate in Toddington, Bedfordshire in 1827. In the same year he married Martha Morton (1798–1862). In 1829 he took over the position of the retiring curate, Charles Davy, of Hampstead Norris in Berkshire, serving under the vicar, James Reed. Upon the vicar's death in 1843, the Marquis of Downshire, reportedly petitioned by the parishioners, appointed Blissard to be his replacement. Blissard remained vicar of Hampstead Norris for the rest of his life, performing his final services only a week prior to his death in 1875.

Over a period of decades, Blissard's household typically included, in addition to his own large family, several pupils preparing for public school or university examinations under Blissard's tutelage. Some of these students were children of prominent families, among them sons of Sir Charles Locock, obstetrician to Queen Victoria. One of Blissard's students, Antonius Ameuney, a Syrian Christian studying in England who later matriculated at Kings College and ultimately became professor of Arabic Language and Literature there, wrote of this time, "the Committee of the Society … sent me to the Rev. John Blissard, of Hampstead Norris, in Berkshire, to complete my studies prior to entering at College. It was during this time that I learned how a truly conscientious and active minister of the church spends his time. Mr. and Mrs. Blissard were constantly employed in some good and benevolent act: their parishioners' welfare was their perpetual care, and they labored earnestly in bringing up their family in the fear of God." The obituary of one of Blissard's sons, John Charles, records that he "received his early education with his father's pupils". Both of Blissard's sons were Wranglers in the Cambridge Mathematical Tripos: John Charles was 34th Wrangler in 1858; William was 26th Wrangler in 1860.

Several years after Blissard's death, the church of Hampstead Norris, an eleventh-century Norman structure dedicated to St. Mary the Virgin, underwent a substantial renovation, and now contains a number of memorials to Blissard. These include the stone pulpit contributed by the sons of Sir Charles Locock and a number of other fixtures contributed by Blissard's family and students.

== Mathematical work ==
In 1861, Blissard published "Theory of generic equations" describing a system that allows certain sequences of numbers, b_{0}, b_{1}, b_{2}, …, to be manipulated algebraically as powers, b^{0}, b^{1}, b^{2}, …, so as to produce valid formulas. The Bernoulli numbers are a prime example of such a sequence. Blissard called his system "representative notation"; it is often referred to as "Blissard's symbolic method", but is most often called "umbral calculus", a term coined by J. J. Sylvester.

Blissard published nine additional papers in The Quarterly Journal of Pure and Applied Mathematics, many of them applying the representative notation and developing it further. He also regularly contributed problems and solutions to the Educational Times, some of which made use of representative notation. He also published two papers in The Oxford, Cambridge, and Dublin Messenger of Mathematics.

The number theorist Édouard Lucas rediscovered Blissard's ideas, publishing fifteen years later. E. T. Bell argues that, although related notational devices due to mathematicians such as Leibniz, Aronhold, and Cayley, which show up in the theory of finite differences, in invariant theory, and in the theory of determinants, share a common mathematical foundation with Blissard's symbolic notation, this was only appreciated in retrospect by Neikirk. The method came to be widely applied in combinatorics, particularly in the book of John Riordan, but its foundations were regarded as suspect by many mathematicians. Starting in the 1970s, Gian-Carlo Rota and coauthors undertook a systematic investigation of the foundations of the theory, a development that continues to this day.

== Family ==
Martha and John Blissard had twelve children. John Blissard's obituary records that, "Three of the youngest children died some years ago from fever within a week, and two of them were buried on the same day. The remainder of his family survive…." Census records, however, show seven children living in the household. Much of Blissard's family was involved with the Church. Blissard's eldest child, Mary Lewis (1827–1872), married Philip A. Longmore, who served as vicar of Hermitage, which had been split off from Hampstead Norris parish during the tenure of Blissard's predecessor. Blissard's two surviving sons John Charles (1835–1904) and William (1836–1918) both studied at Cambridge, both taught mathematics for a time, (John Charles at the Cheam School, William at Sedbergh School and King's School, Canterbury), and both became clergyman. For many decades, John Charles held the incumbency at St Augustine's Church, Edgbaston in Birmingham. William was vicar of Seasalter, and then rector at Bishopsbourne. He was known for his books of social criticism, including The Ethic of Usury and Interest and The Economic Anti-Christ: A Study in Social Polity.
