= Dickson's lemma =

In mathematics, Dickson's lemma states that every set of $n$-tuples of natural numbers has finitely many minimal elements, for the pointwise partial order. This simple fact from combinatorics has become attributed to the American algebraist L. E. Dickson, who used it to prove a result in number theory about perfect numbers. However, the lemma was certainly known earlier, for example to Paul Gordan in his research on invariant theory.

== Example ==
Infinitely many minimal pairs of real numbers x,y (the black hyperbola) but only five minimal pairs of positive integers (red) have xy ≥ 9.

Let $K$ be a fixed natural number, and let $S = \{(x,y)\mid xy\ge K\}$ be the set of pairs of numbers whose product is at least $K$. When defined over the positive real numbers, $S$ has infinitely many minimal elements of the form $(x,K/x)$, one for each positive number $x$; this set of points forms one of the branches of a hyperbola. The pairs on this hyperbola are minimal, because it is not possible for a different pair that belongs to $S$ to be less than or equal to $(x,K/x)$ in both of its coordinates. However, Dickson's lemma concerns only tuples of natural numbers, and over the natural numbers there are only finitely many minimal pairs. Every minimal pair $(x,y)$ of natural numbers has $x \le K$ and $y \le K$, for if x were greater than K then (x − 1, y) would also belong to S, contradicting the minimality of (x, y), and symmetrically if y were greater than K then (x, y − 1) would also belong to S. Therefore, over the natural numbers, $S$ has at most $K^2$ minimal elements, a finite number. (Note: With more care, it is possible to show that one of $x$ and $y$ is at most $\sqrt K$, and that there is at most one minimal pair for each choice of one of the coordinates, from which it follows that there are at most $2\sqrt K$ minimal elements.)

== Formal statement ==
Let $\mathbb{N}$ be the set of non-negative integers (natural numbers), let n be any fixed constant, and let $\mathbb{N}^n$ be the set of $n$-tuples of natural numbers. These tuples may be given a pointwise partial order, the product order, in which $(a_1,a_2,\dots,a_n)\le (b_1,b_2,\dots b_n)$ if and only if $a_i\le b_i$ for every $i$. The set of tuples that are greater than or equal to some particular tuple $(a_1,a_2,\dots,a_n)$ forms a positive orthant with its apex at the given tuple.

With this notation, Dickson's lemma may be stated in several equivalent forms:

- In every non-empty subset $S$ of $\mathbb{N}^n$ there is at least one but no more than a finite number of elements that are minimal elements of $S$ for the pointwise partial order.
- For every infinite sequence $(x_i)_{i\in\mathbb{N}}$ of $n$-tuples of natural numbers, there exist two indices $i<j$ such that $x_i \leq x_j$ holds with respect to the pointwise order.
- The partially ordered set $(\mathbb{N}^n,\le)$ does not contain infinite antichains nor infinite (strictly) descending sequences of $n$-tuples.
- The partially ordered set $(\mathbb{N}^n,\le)$ is a well partial order.
- Every subset $S$ of $\mathbb{N}^n$ may be covered by a finite set of positive orthants, whose apexes all belong to $S$.

== Generalizations and applications ==
Dickson used his lemma to prove that, for any given number $n$, there can exist only a finite number of odd perfect numbers that have at most $n$ prime factors. However, it remains open whether there exist any odd perfect numbers at all.

The divisibility relation among the P-smooth numbers, natural numbers whose prime factors all belong to the finite set P, gives these numbers the structure of a partially ordered set isomorphic to $(\mathbb{N}^{|P|},\le)$. Thus, for any set S of P-smooth numbers, there is a finite subset of S such that every element of S is divisible by one of the numbers in this subset. This fact has been used, for instance, to show that there exists an algorithm for classifying the winning and losing moves from the initial position in the game of Sylver coinage, even though the algorithm itself remains unknown.

The tuples $(a_1,a_2,\dots,a_n)$ in $\mathbb{N}^n$ correspond one-for-one with the monomials $x_1^{a_1} x_2^{a_2} \dots x_n^{a_n}$ over a set of $n$ variables $x_1,x_2,\dots x_n$. Under this correspondence, Dickson's lemma may be seen as a special case of Hilbert's basis theorem stating that every polynomial ideal has a finite basis, for the ideals generated by monomials. Indeed, Paul Gordan used this restatement of Dickson's lemma in 1899 as part of a proof of Hilbert's basis theorem.

== See also ==
- Gordan's lemma
