= First and second fundamental theorems of invariant theory =

In algebra, the first and second fundamental theorems of invariant theory concern the generators and relations of the ring of invariants in the ring of polynomial functions for classical groups (roughly, the first concerns the generators and the second the relations). The theorems are among the most important results of invariant theory.

Classically the theorems are proved over the complex numbers. But characteristic-free invariant theory extends the theorems to a field of arbitrary characteristic.

== First fundamental theorem for $\operatorname{GL}(V)$ ==
The theorem states that the ring of $\operatorname{GL}(V)$-invariant polynomial functions on ${V^*}^p \oplus V^q$ is generated by the functions $\langle \alpha_i | v_j \rangle$, where $\alpha_i$ are in $V^*$ and $v_j \in V$.

== Second fundamental theorem for general linear group ==
Let V, W be finite-dimensional vector spaces over the complex numbers. Then the only $\operatorname{GL}(V) \times \operatorname{GL}(W)$-invariant prime ideals in $\mathbb{C}[\operatorname{hom}(V, W)]$ are the determinant ideal $I_k = \mathbb{C}[\operatorname{hom}(V, W)]D_k$ generated by the determinants of all the $k \times k$-minors.
