= Cayley process =

Cayley process may refer to:

- Cayley's omega process in invariant theory
- Cayley–Dickson process for constructing nonassociative algebras
