= Hilbert's fourteenth problem =

Are certain algebras finitely generated

In mathematics, Hilbert's fourteenth problem, the fourteenth of Hilbert's problems proposed in 1900, asks whether certain algebras are finitely generated.

Let $k$ be a field and let $K$ be a subfield of the field of rational functions

$$k(x_1,\ldots,x_n)$$

containing $k$. Hilbert asked whether the $k$-algebra

$$R: =K\cap k[x_1,\ldots,x_n]$$

is always finitely generated over $k$.

The answer is negative in general, but depends strongly on dimension. Writing $r=\operatorname{trdeg}_k K$ for the transcendence degree of $K$ over $k$, Oscar Zariski (1954) proved that $R$ is finitely generated whenever $r\leq 2$; in particular, the answer is affirmative for $n\leq 2$. Masayoshi Nagata constructed the first counterexamples in 1958, one of which he announced at the 1958 International Congress of Mathematicians; his first construction has $n=32$ and $r=4$.

In characteristic zero, Shigeru Kuroda subsequently constructed counterexamples with $n=4$ and $r=3$ in 2004, and with $n=3$ in 2005. Thus the bounds are sharp: finite generation always holds when $n\leq2$ or $r\leq2$, whereas counterexamples already occur with $n=r=3$.

== History ==
The problem originally arose in algebraic invariant theory. Here the ring $R$ is given as a (suitably defined) ring of polynomial invariants of a linear algebraic group over a field $k$ acting algebraically on a polynomial ring $k[x_1, ..., x_n]$ (or more generally, on a finitely generated algebra defined over a field).

In this situation the field $K$ is the field of rational functions (quotients of polynomials) in the variables $x_i$ which are invariant under the given action of the algebraic group, and the ring $R$ is the ring of polynomials which are invariant under the action.

A classical example in the nineteenth century was the extensive study (in particular by Cayley, Sylvester, Clebsch, Paul Gordan and also Hilbert) of invariants of binary forms in two variables under the natural action of the special linear group $\mathrm{SL}_2(k)$.

Hilbert proved finite-generation results for invariant rings arising from important classical group actions in characteristic zero. These results were subsequently extended, notably by Hermann Weyl, and in modern form invariant rings of reductive algebraic groups acting on finitely generated algebras are finitely generated. By contrast, invariant rings of non-reductive groups need not be finitely generated; Nagata's counterexample is a suitably constructed ring of invariants for a linear action of a non-reductive linear algebraic group.

A major ingredient in Hilbert's proof is the Hilbert basis theorem applied to the ideal inside the polynomial ring generated by the invariants.

== Zariski's formulation ==
Zariski gave an algebro-geometric formulation of Hilbert's fourteenth problem in terms of quasi-affine varieties. More precisely, the rings of global regular functions on irreducible normal quasi-affine varieties are, up to isomorphism, precisely the rings of the form $L\cap A$, where $A$ is a normal finitely generated $k$-domain and $L$ is a subfield of its field of fractions containing $k$. Thus Hilbert's question can equivalently be viewed as asking whether the ring of global regular functions on such a quasi-affine variety must be finitely generated.

Zariski (1954) proved that $L\cap A$ is finitely generated when $\operatorname{trdeg}_k L\leq 2$. In particular, Hilbert's original problem has an affirmative answer for $n\leq 2$. See also Zariski's finiteness theorem.

== Nagata's counterexample ==
Nagata constructed the first counterexamples to Hilbert's fourteenth problem in 1958. The following example was announced at the 1958 International Congress of Mathematicians.

Let $\pi$ be the prime field of a field $k$ and let

$$k=\pi(a_{ij}\mid 1\leq i\leq 3,\ 1\leq j\leq16),$$

where the 48 elements $a_{ij}$ are algebraically independent over $\pi$. Let

$$A=k[x_1,\ldots,x_{16},t_1,\ldots,t_{16}]$$

be the polynomial ring in 32 variables. Let $V$ be the 13-dimensional subspace of $k^{16}$ consisting of the vectors $(b_1,\ldots,b_{16})$ orthogonal to each of

$$(a_{i1},\ldots,a_{i16}),\qquad i=1,2,3.$$

With its additive group structure, $V$ is isomorphic as an algebraic group to $\mathbb G_a^{13}$. An element $(b_1,\ldots,b_{16})\in V$ acts on $A$ by

$$t_j\mapsto t_j,\qquad x_j\mapsto x_j+b_jt_j\qquad (1\leq j\leq16).$$

Nagata proved that the invariant ring $A^V$ is not finitely generated over $k$. If $L$ is the field of invariant rational functions, then $A^V=L\cap A$, so this gives a counterexample to Hilbert's original formulation. For this example, $n=32$ and $r=19$.

Nagata's other counterexample, published in his 1959 paper, also has $n=32$, but has $r=4$.

== Later counterexamples ==
Further counterexamples were constructed with progressively fewer variables. Roberts (1990) gave a counterexample with $n=7$ and $r=6$. It was later realized as the invariant ring of a nonlinear action of the additive group $\mathbb G_a$. Related constructions gave counterexamples with $(n,r)=(6,5)$ by Gene Freudenburg and with $(n,r)=(5,4)$ by Daniel Daigle and Freudenburg.

The subsequent counterexamples of Kuroda reached the theoretical lower bounds for both $r$ and $n$. In 2004, Shigeru Kuroda constructed counterexamples with $(n,r)=(4,3)$, showing that the lower bound on $r$ is sharp. In 2005, he constructed a counterexample with $(n,r)=(3,3)$. This also attains the smallest possible value of $n$, since Zariski's theorem gives an affirmative answer for $n\leq2$.

In the linear invariant-theoretic setting, Shigeru Mukai (2004) constructed, over the complex numbers, linear actions of the three-dimensional additive group $\mathbb G_a^3$ whose invariant rings are not finitely generated. Totaro (2008) extended such counterexamples to arbitrary fields, giving in particular a linear action of $\mathbb G_a^3$ on $\mathbb A^{18}$ with a non-finitely generated invariant ring.

== See also ==
- Locally nilpotent derivation
- Nagata's conjecture on curves
