= Nullform =

In mathematics, a nullform of a vector space acted on linearly by a group is a vector on which all invariants of the group vanish. Nullforms were introduced by Hilbert (1893).
