= Peters polynomials =

In mathematics, the Peters polynomials s_{n}(x) are polynomials studied by George Peters given by the generating function

$$\displaystyle \sum_{n=0}^{+\infty} s_n(x)\frac{t^n}{n!} = \frac{(1+t)^x}{(1+(1+t)^\lambda)^{\mu}}$$

(Roman 1984, 4.4.6), (Boas & Buck 1958, p.37). They are a generalization of the Boole polynomials.

== See also ==
- Umbral calculus
