= Transvection =

Transvection may refer to:

- Transvection (flying)
- Transvection (genetics)

== Mathematics ==
- The creation of a transvectant in invariant theory
- A shear mapping in linear algebra
- Raising and lowering indices
