= Pidduck =

Pidduck may refer to:

- Len Pidduck (1926–2014), British wrestler
- Pidduck polynomials
