= Stabilizer =

Stabilizer, stabiliser, stabilisation or stabilization may refer to:

== Chemistry and food processing ==
- Stabilizer (chemistry), a substance added to prevent unwanted change in state of another substance
  - Polymer stabilizers are stabilizers used specifically in plastic or other polymers
- Stabilizer (food), a type of food additive
- Wood stabilization, a wood preservation process to prevent distortion caused by moisture
- Clarification and stabilization of wine

== Mathematics ==
- Stabilization (category theory)
- Stabilizer subgroup

== Technology ==
- Buoyancy compensator (diving) adjusts buoyancy.
- Stabilizer (aircraft), surfaces to help keep aircraft under control. Includes:
  - Vertical stabilizer of airplanes
  - Tailplane or horizontal stabilizer
- Stabilizer (ship), fins on ships to counteract roll
- Stabilizer, another name for bicycle training wheels
- Stabilizers, the extendable legs mounted on a land vehicle which are folded out when stabilization is required; see Outrigger
- Drilling stabilizer, part of the bottom hole assembly in oil drilling
- Gyroscopic stabilizer (disambiguation), on ships and aircraft
- Gun stabilizer, or gyrostabilizer, a device that helps a moving tank's gunner to aim the gun
- Sway bar, a bar linking the two sides of an automotive suspension
- Stabilization pond, a way of stabilizing wastewater
- Voltage stabilizer, a system designed to automatically maintain a constant voltage

=== Photography ===
- Camera stabilizer, an external mechanical device to stabilize the camera as a whole
- Image stabilization, software or hardware that stabilizes the image

== Other uses ==
- Stabilization (architecture) of worn or damaged foundations of a structure
- Stabilization (medical) is a process to help prevent shock in sick or injured people
- Stabilization (warfare), part of counter-insurgency operations
- Automatic stabilizer, an economics term
- Crude oil stabilisation, part of an oil production plant
- Mood stabilizer, a kind of psychiatric medication
- Segmental stabilizers are the muscles which provide support across joints
- Stabiliser cattle, a breed of beef cattle
- Stabilizer code, a concept in quantum error correction
- Stabilizers (band), an American band

== See also ==
- Destabilisation
- Stability (disambiguation)
