= Stable algorithm =

- In computer science, a stable sorting algorithm preserves the order of records with equal keys.
- In numerical analysis, a numerically stable algorithm avoids magnifying small errors. An algorithm is stable if the result produced is relatively insensitive to perturbations during computation.

== See also ==
- Stable (disambiguation)
- Stability (disambiguation)
