= Hilbert–Mumford criterion =

In mathematics, the Hilbert–Mumford criterion, introduced by David Hilbert and David Mumford, characterizes the semistable and stable points of a group action on a vector space in terms of eigenvalues of 1-parameter subgroups (Dieudonné & Carrell 1970, 1971, p.58).

== Definition of stability ==
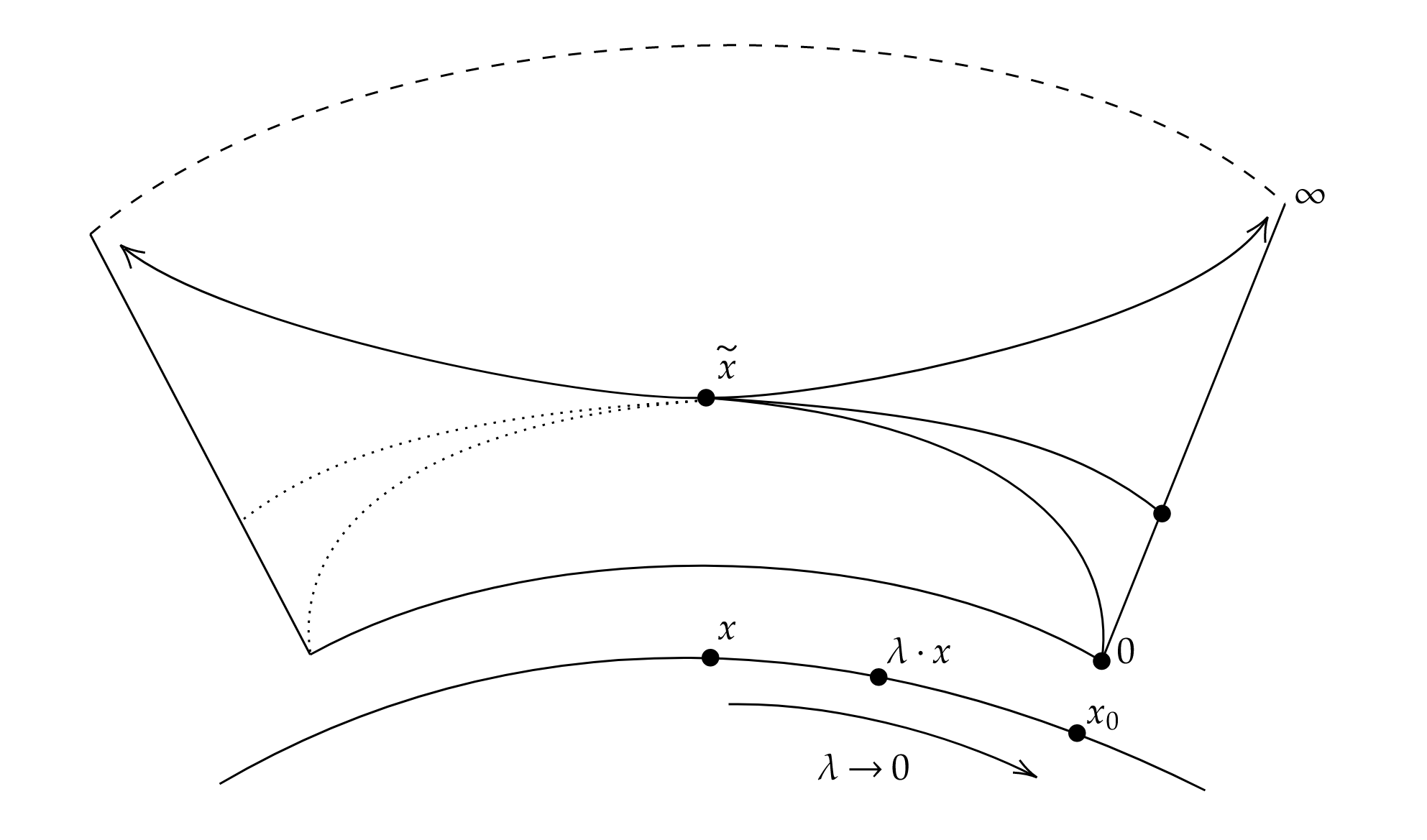
When the weight on the fibre over the limit x_{0} is positive, the point x is taken to 0 along the C^{*} action and the orbit closure contains 0. When the weight is positive, x goes off to infinity, and the orbit is closed.

Let G be a reductive group acting linearly on a vector space V, a non-zero point of V is called

- semi-stable if 0 is not contained in the closure of its orbit, and unstable otherwise;
- stable if its orbit is closed, and its stabilizer is finite. A stable point is a fortiori semi-stable. A semi-stable but not stable point is called strictly semi-stable.

When G is the multiplicative group $\mathbb{G}_m$, e.g. C^{*} in the complex setting, the action amounts to a finite dimensional representation $\lambda\colon \mathbf{C}^*\to\mathrm{GL}(V)$. We can decompose V into a direct sum $V=\textstyle\bigoplus_i V_i$, where on each component V_{i} the action is given as $\lambda(t)\cdot v=t^iv$. The integer i is called the weight. Then for each point x, we look at the set of weights in which it has a non-zero component.

- If all the weights are strictly positive, then $\lim_{t\to0}\lambda(t)\cdot x=0$, so 0 is in the closure of the orbit of x, i.e. x is unstable;
- If all the weights are non-negative, with 0 being a weight, then either 0 is the only weight, in which case x is stabilized by C^{*}; or there are some positive weights beside 0, then the limit $\lim_{t\to0}\lambda(t)\cdot x$ is equal to the weight-0 component of x, which is not in the orbit of x. So the two cases correspond exactly to the respective failure of the two conditions in the definition of a stable point, i.e. we have shown that x is strictly semi-stable.

== Statement ==
The Hilbert–Mumford criterion essentially says that the multiplicative group case is the typical situation. Precisely, for a general reductive group G acting linearly on a vector space V, the stability of a point x can be characterized via the study of 1-parameter subgroups of G, which are non-trivial morphisms $\lambda\colon\mathbb{G}_m\to G$. Notice that the weights for the inverse $\lambda^{-1}$ are precisely minus those of $\lambda$, so the statements can be made symmetric.

- A point x is unstable if and only if there is a 1-parameter subgroup of G for which x admits only positive weights or only negative weights; equivalently, x is semi-stable if and only if there is no such 1-parameter subgroup, i.e. for every 1-parameter subgroup there are both non-positive and non-negative weights;
- A point x is strictly semi-stable if and only if there is a 1-parameter subgroup of G for which x admits 0 as a weight, with all the weights being non-negative (or non-positive);
- A point x is stable if and only if there is no 1-parameter subgroup of G for which x admits only non-negative weights or only non-positive weights, i.e. for every 1-parameter subgroup there are both positive and negative weights.

== Examples and applications ==
The action of C^{*} on the plane C^{2}, with orbits being plane conics (hyperbolas).

=== Action of C^{*} on the plane ===
The standard example is the action of C^{*} on the plane C^{2} defined as $t\cdot(x,y)=(tx,t^{-1}y)$. The weight in the x-direction is 1 and the weight in the y-direction is -1. Thus by the Hilbert–Mumford criterion, a non-zero point on the x-axis admits 1 as its only weight, and a non-zero point on the y-axis admits -1 as its only weight, so they are both unstable; a general point in the plane admits both 1 and -1 as weights, so it is stable.

=== Points in P^{1} ===
Many examples arise in moduli problems. For example, consider a set of n points on the rational curve P^{1} (more precisely, a length-n subscheme of P^{1}). The automorphism group of P^{1}, PSL(2,C), acts on such sets (subschemes), and the Hilbert–Mumford criterion allows us to determine the stability under this action.

We can linearize the problem by identifying a set of n points with a degree-n homogeneous polynomial in two variables. We consider therefore the action of SL(2,C) on the vector space $H^0(\mathcal{O}_{\mathbf{P}^1}(n))$ of such homogeneous polynomials. Given a 1-parameter subgroup $\lambda\colon\mathbf{C}^*\to \mathrm{SL}(2,\mathbf{C})$, we can choose coordinates x and y so that the action on P^{1} is given as

$$\lambda(t)\cdot [x:y]=[t^kx:t^{-k}y].$$

For a homogeneous polynomial of form $\textstyle\sum_{i=0}^na_ix^iy^{n-i}$, the term $x^iy^{n-i}$ has weight k(2i-n). So the polynomial admits both positive and negative (resp. non-positive and non-negative) weights if and only if there are terms with i>n/2 and i<n/2 (resp. i≥n/2 and i≤n/2). In particular the multiplicity of x or y should be <n/2 (reps. ≤n/2). If we repeat over all the 1-parameter subgroups, we may obtain the same condition of multiplicity for all points in P^{1}. By the Hilbert–Mumford criterion, the polynomial (and thus the set of n points) is stable (resp. semi-stable) if and only if its multiplicity at any point is <n/2 (resp. ≤n/2).

=== Plane cubics ===
A similar analysis using homogeneous polynomial can be carried out to determine the stability of plane cubics. The Hilbert–Mumford criterion shows that a plane cubic is stable if and only if it is smooth; it is semi-stable if and only if it admits at worst ordinary double points as singularities; a cubic with worse singularities (e.g. a cusp) is unstable.

== See also ==
- Geometric invariant theory
- GIT quotient
