= Steady state =

State in which variables of a system are unchanging in time

In systems theory, a system or a process is in a steady state if the variables (called state variables) which define the behavior of the system or the process are unchanging in time. In continuous time, this means that for those properties p of the system, the partial derivative with respect to time is zero and remains so:

$$\frac{\partial p}{\partial t} = 0 \quad \text{for all present and future } t.$$

In discrete time, it means that the first difference of each property is zero and remains so:

$$p_t-p_{t-1}=0 \quad \text{for all present and future } t.$$

The concept of a steady state has relevance in many fields, in particular thermodynamics, economics, and engineering. If a system is in a steady state, then the recently observed behavior of the system will continue into the future. In stochastic systems, the probabilities that various states will be repeated will remain constant. For example, see Linear difference equation § Conversion to homogeneous form for the derivation of the steady state.

In many systems, a steady state is not achieved until some time after the system is started or initiated. This initial situation is often identified as a transient state, start-up or warm-up period. For example, while the flow of fluid through a tube or electricity through a network could be in a steady state because there is a constant flow of fluid or electricity, a tank or capacitor being drained or filled with fluid is a system in transient state, because its volume of fluid changes with time.

Often, a steady state is approached asymptotically. An unstable system is one that diverges from the steady state. See for example Linear difference equation#Stability.

In chemistry, a steady state is a more general situation than dynamic equilibrium. While a dynamic equilibrium occurs when two or more reversible processes occur at the same rate, and such a system can be said to be in a steady state, a system that is in a steady state may not necessarily be in a state of dynamic equilibrium, because some of the processes involved are not reversible. In other words, dynamic equilibrium is just one manifestation of a steady state.

== Applications ==
=== Economics ===
A steady state economy is an economy (especially a national economy but possibly that of a city, a region, or the world) of stable size featuring a stable population and stable consumption that remain at or below carrying capacity. In the economic growth model of Robert Solow and Trevor Swan, the steady state occurs when gross investment in physical capital equals depreciation and the economy reaches economic equilibrium, which may occur during a period of growth.

=== Electrical engineering ===
In electrical engineering and electronic engineering, steady state is an equilibrium condition of a circuit or network that occurs as the effects of transients are no longer important. Steady state is also used as an approximation in systems with on-going transient signals, such as audio systems, to allow simplified analysis of first order performance.

Sinusoidal Steady State Analysis is a method for analyzing alternating current circuits using the same techniques as for solving DC circuits.

The ability of an electrical machine or power system to regain its original/previous state is called Steady State Stability.

The stability of a system refers to the ability of a system to return to its steady state when subjected to a disturbance. As mentioned before, power is generated by synchronous generators that operate in synchronism with the rest of the system. A generator is synchronized with a bus when both of them have same frequency, voltage and phase sequence. We can thus define the power system stability as the ability of the power system to return to steady state without losing synchronicity. Usually power system stability is categorized into steady state, transient and dynamic stability.

Steady State Stability studies are restricted to small and gradual changes in the system operating conditions. In this we basically concentrate on restricting the bus voltages close to their nominal values. We also ensure that phase angles between two buses are not too large and check for the overloading of the power equipment and transmission lines. These checks are usually done using power flow studies.

Transient Stability involves the study of the power system following a major disturbance. Following a large disturbance in the synchronous alternator the machine power (load) angle changes due to sudden acceleration of the rotor shaft. The objective of the transient stability study is to ascertain whether the load angle returns to a steady value following the clearance of the disturbance.

The ability of a power system to maintain stability under continuous small disturbances is investigated under the name of Dynamic Stability (also known as small-signal stability). These small disturbances occur due to random fluctuations in loads and generation levels. In an interconnected power system, these random variations can lead catastrophic failure as this may force the rotor angle to increase steadily.

Steady state determination is an important topic, because many design specifications of electronic systems are given in terms of the steady-state characteristics. Periodic steady-state solution is also a prerequisite for small signal dynamic modeling. Steady-state analysis is therefore an indispensable component of the design process.

In some cases, it is useful to consider constant envelope vibration—vibration that never settles down to motionlessness, but continues to move at constant amplitude—a kind of steady-state condition.

=== Chemical engineering ===
In chemistry, thermodynamics, and other chemical engineering, a steady state is a situation in which all state variables are constant in spite of ongoing processes that strive to change them. For an entire system to be at steady state, i.e. for all state variables of a system to be constant, there must be a flow through the system (compare mass balance). One of the simplest examples of such a system is the case of a bathtub with the tap open but without the bottom plug: after a certain time the water flows in and out at the same rate, so the water level (the state variable being Volume) stabilizes and the system is at steady state. Of course the Volume stabilizing inside the tub depends on the size of the tub, the diameter of the exit hole and the flowrate of water in. Since the tub can overflow, eventually a steady state can be reached where the water flowing in equals the overflow plus the water out through the drain.

A steady state flow process requires conditions at all points in an apparatus remain constant as time changes. There must be no accumulation of mass or energy over the time period of interest. The same mass flow rate will remain constant in the flow path through each element of the system. Thermodynamic properties may vary from point to point, but will remain unchanged at any given point.

=== Mechanical engineering ===
When a periodic force is applied to a mechanical system, it will typically reach a steady state after going through some transient behavior. This is often observed in vibrating systems, such as a clock pendulum, but can happen with any type of stable or semi-stable dynamic system. The length of the transient state will depend on the initial conditions of the system. Given certain initial conditions, a system may be in steady state from the beginning.

=== Biochemistry ===
In biochemistry, the study of biochemical pathways is an important topic. Such pathways will often display steady-state behavior where the chemical species are unchanging, but there is a continuous dissipation of flux through the pathway. Many, but not all, biochemical pathways evolve to stable, steady states. As a result, the steady state represents an important reference state to study. This is also related to the concept of homeostasis, however, in biochemistry, a steady state can be stable or unstable such as in the case of sustained oscillations or bistable behavior.

=== Physiology ===
Homeostasis (from Greek ὅμοιος, hómoios, "similar" and στάσις, stásis, "standing still") is the property of a system that regulates its internal environment and tends to maintain a stable, constant condition. Typically used to refer to a living organism, the concept came from that of milieu interieur that was created by Claude Bernard and published in 1865. Multiple dynamic equilibrium adjustment and regulation mechanisms make homeostasis possible.

=== Fiber optics ===
In fiber optics, "steady state" is a synonym for equilibrium mode distribution.

=== Pharmacokinetics ===
In the field of pharmacokinetics, steady state refers to the condition in which the rate of drug administration is balanced by the rate of drug elimination, resulting in a stable concentration of the drug in the bloodstream over time. This equilibrium typically occurs following repeated dosing or continuous infusion, and is used to ensure consistent therapeutic drug levels. For most drugs exhibiting first-order kinetics, steady state is generally achieved after approximately four to five half-lives, at which point the changes in plasma concentrations between doses become minimal and predictable.

At steady state, drug concentrations do not remain at a single, unchanging value but rather fluctuate within a limited range bounded by peak (C_{max}) and trough (C_{min}) values across each dosing interval. Ideally, this range is maintained above the minimum effective (therapeutic) concentration and below the threshold for adverse effects, thereby achieving concentrations within the so-called therapeutic window.

== See also ==
- Control theory
- Equilibrium point
- List of types of equilibrium
- Stability (disambiguation)
- State function
- Stationary process
- Stationary state
- Time invariance
- Transient state
