= Orbital Stability =

Orbital stability may refer to:

- The stability of orbits of planetary bodies
- Resonance between said orbits
- The closure of the orbit of a reductive group, in geometric invariant theory
- A stable electron configuration
