= Hilbert dimension =

In mathematics the term Hilbert dimension may refer to:

- Hilbert space dimension
- Hilbert dimension in ring theory, see Hilbert's basis theorem

== See also ==
- Hilbert series and Hilbert polynomial
