= List of algorithm general topics =

This is a list of algorithm general topics.

- Analysis of algorithms
- Ant colony algorithm
- Approximation algorithm
- Best and worst cases
- Big O notation
- Combinatorial search
- Competitive analysis
- Computability theory
- Computational complexity theory
- Embarrassingly parallel problem
- Emergent algorithm
- Evolutionary algorithm
- Fast Fourier transform
- Genetic algorithm
- Graph exploration algorithm
- Heuristic
- Hill climbing
- Implementation
- Las Vegas algorithm
- Lock-free and wait-free algorithms
- Monte Carlo algorithm
- Numerical analysis
- Online algorithm
- Polynomial time approximation scheme
- Problem size
- Pseudorandom number generator
- Quantum algorithm
- Random-restart hill climbing
- Randomized algorithm
- Running time
- Sorting algorithm
- Search algorithm
- Stable algorithm (disambiguation)
- Super-recursive algorithm
- Tree search algorithm

== See also ==
- List of algorithms for specific algorithms
- List of computability and complexity topics for more abstract theory
- List of complexity classes, complexity class
- List of data structures
- Outline of algorithms
