= Boole polynomials =

In mathematics, the Boole polynomials s_{n}(x) are polynomials given by the generating function

$$\displaystyle \sum s_n(x)t^n/n! = \frac{(1+t)^x}{1+(1+t)^\lambda}$$

== See also ==
- Umbral calculus
- Peters polynomials, a generalization of Boole polynomials.
