= Paul Gordan =

German mathematician (1837–1912)

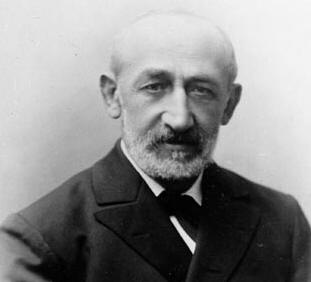
- Paul Gordan
- Born: Paul Albert Gordan; 27 April 1837; Breslau, Province of Silesia, Kingdom of Prussia
- Died: 21 December 1912 (aged 75); Erlangen, Kingdom of Bavaria, German Empire
- Education: University of Breslau
- Known for: Invariant theory Clebsch–Gordan coefficients Gordan's lemma
- Scientific career
- Workplaces: University of Erlangen-Nuremberg
- Doctoral students: Emmy Noether

Paul Albert Gordan (27 April 1837 – 21 December 1912) was a German mathematician known for work in invariant theory and for the Clebsch–Gordan coefficients and Gordan's lemma. He was called "the king of invariant theory". His most famous result is that the ring of invariants of binary forms of fixed degree is finitely generated. Clebsch–Gordan coefficients are named after him and Alfred Clebsch. Gordan also served as the thesis advisor for Emmy Noether.

== Life and career ==
Gordan was born to Jewish parents in Breslau, Germany (now Wrocław, Poland), and died in Erlangen, Germany.

He received his Dr. phil. at the University of Breslau with the thesis De Linea Geodetica, (On Geodesics of Spheroids) in 1862. He moved to Erlangen in 1874 to become professor of mathematics at the University of Erlangen-Nuremberg.

A famous quote attributed to Gordan about David Hilbert's proof of Hilbert's basis theorem, a result which vastly generalized his result on invariants, is "This is not mathematics; this is theology." The proof in question was the (non-constructive) existence of a finite basis for invariants. It is not clear if Gordan really said this since the earliest reference to it is 25 years after the events and after his death. Nor is it clear whether the quote was intended as criticism, or praise, or a subtle joke. Gordan himself encouraged Hilbert and used Hilbert's results and methods, and the widespread story that he opposed Hilbert's work on invariant theory is a myth (though he did correctly point out in a referee's report that some of the reasoning in Hilbert's paper was incomplete).

He later said "I have convinced myself that even theology has its merits". He also published a simplified version of the proof.

== Publications ==
- Gordan, Paul (1862). De linea geodetica.
- Gordan, Paul (1885). Vorlesungen über Invariantentheorie. Vol. 1. Teubner.
- Gordan, Paul (1887). Dr. Paul Gordan's Vorlesungen über Invariantentheorie. Vol. 2. B. G. Teubner.
- Gordan, Paul (1987) [1885], Kerschensteiner, Georg (ed.), Vorlesungen über Invariantentheorie (2nd ed.), New York: Chelsea Publishing Co. or American Mathematical Society, ISBN 978-0-8284-0328-3, MR 0917266

== See also ==
- Dickson's lemma
- Invariant of a binary form
- Symbolic method
