= George Kempf =

American mathematician (1944–2002)

George Rushing Kempf
- Born: 12 August 1944; Globe, Arizona, US
- Died: 16 July 2002 (aged 57); Lawrence, Kansas, US
- Education: Johns Hopkins University; University of Illinois at Urbana-Champaign; Columbia University
- Scientific career
- Fields: Mathematician
- Workplaces: Johns Hopkins University
- Doctoral advisor: Steven Kleiman

George Rushing Kempf (Globe, Arizona, August 12, 1944 – Lawrence, Kansas, July 16, 2002) was a mathematician who worked on algebraic geometry, who proved the Riemann–Kempf singularity theorem, the Kempf–Ness theorem, the Kempf vanishing theorem, and who introduced Kempf varieties.

== Mumford on Kempf ==
'I met George in 1970 when he burst on the algebraic geometry scene with a spectacular PhD thesis. His thesis gave a wonderful analysis of the singularities of the subvarieties $W_r$ of the Jacobian of a curve obtained by adding the curve to itself $r$ times inside its Jacobian. This was one of the major themes that he pursued throughout his career: understanding the interaction of a curve with its Jacobian and especially to the map from the $r$-fold symmetric product of the curve to the Jacobian. In his thesis he gave a determinantal representation both of $W_r$ and of its tangent cone at all its singular points, which gives you a complete understanding of the nature of these singularities' – David Mumford

'One of the things that distinguished his work was the total mastery with which he used higher cohomology. A paper which, I believe, every new student of algebraic geometry should read, is his elementary proof of the Riemann-Roch theorem on curves: “Algebraic Curves” in Crelle, 1977. That such an old result could be treated with new insight was the work of a master.' – David Mumford
