= Quotient by an equivalence relation =

Generalization of equivalence classes to scheme theory

In mathematics, given a category C, a quotient of an object X by an equivalence relation $f: R \to X \times X$ is a coequalizer for the pair of maps

$$R \ \overset{f}{\to}\ X \times X \ \overset{\operatorname{pr}_i}{\to}\ X,\ \ i = 1,2,$$

where R is an object in C and "f is an equivalence relation" means that, for any object T in C, the image (which is a set) of $f: R(T) = \operatorname{Mor}(T, R) \to X(T) \times X(T)$ is an equivalence relation; that is, a reflexive, symmetric and transitive relation.

The basic case in practice is when C is the category of all schemes over some scheme S. But the notion is flexible and one can also take C to be the category of sheaves.

== Examples ==
- Let X be a set and consider some equivalence relation on it. Let Q be the set of all equivalence classes in X. Then the map $q: X \to Q$ that sends an element x to the equivalence class to which x belongs is a quotient.
- In the above example, Q is a subset of the power set H of X. In algebraic geometry, one might replace H by a Hilbert scheme or disjoint union of Hilbert schemes. In fact, Grothendieck constructed a relative Picard scheme of a flat projective scheme X as a quotient Q (of the scheme Z parametrizing relative effective divisors on X) that is a closed scheme of a Hilbert scheme H. The quotient map $q: Z \to Q$ can then be thought of as a relative version of the Abel map.

== See also ==
- Categorical quotient, a special case
