= Kempf–Ness theorem =

Criterion for vector stability in algebraic geometry

In algebraic geometry, the Kempf–Ness theorem, introduced by George Kempf and Linda Ness (1979), gives a criterion for the stability of a vector in a representation of a complex reductive group. If the complex vector space is given a norm that is invariant under a maximal compact subgroup of the reductive group, then the Kempf–Ness theorem states that a vector is stable if and only if the norm attains a minimum value on the orbit of the vector.

The theorem has the following consequence: If X is a complex smooth projective variety and if G is a reductive complex Lie group, then $X /\!/ G$ (the GIT quotient of X by G) is homeomorphic to the symplectic quotient of X by a maximal compact subgroup of G.
