= Kempf vanishing theorem =

Theorem in algebraic geometry

In algebraic geometry, the Kempf vanishing theorem, introduced by Kempf (1976), states that the higher cohomology group H^{i}(G/B,L(λ)) (i > 0) vanishes whenever λ is a dominant weight of B. Here G is a reductive algebraic group over an algebraically closed field, B a Borel subgroup, and L(λ) a line bundle associated to λ. In characteristic 0 this is a special case of the Borel–Weil–Bott theorem, but unlike the Borel–Weil–Bott theorem, the Kempf vanishing theorem still holds in positive characteristic.

Andersen (1980) and Haboush (1980) found simpler proofs of the Kempf vanishing theorem using the Frobenius morphism.
