= Stable (disambiguation) =

A stable is a building in which livestock are kept. As an adjective, it means unchanging, permanent, firmly fixed or established (see Stability).

Stable or stables may also refer to:

- Stables (Law), Scottish law firms, employing advocates
- Stables (surname), people with the surname
- Stable (music), a group of musicians who work under the same agency, management, publisher or record company. See: roster.
- Stable (wrestling), a group of wrestlers within a promotion who have a common element in professional wrestling.
  - Heya (sumo), an organization of sumo wrestlers, along with their physical living quarters, commonly translated as "stable"
- The Stables, a music venue in Milton Keynes, England

== See also ==
- Stability (disambiguation)
