= Narumi polynomials =

In mathematics, Narumi polynomials are polynomials introduced by Narumi (1929) given by the generating function

$$\sum_{n=0}^\infty \frac{s_n(x)}{n!}t^n = \left(\frac{t}{\log(1+t)}\right)^a(1+t)^x.$$

They form the Sheffer sequence for

$$g(t)=\Big(\frac{e^t-1}{t}\Big)^{-a}, \quad f(t)=e^t-1.$$

== See also ==
- Umbral calculus
