= Bernoulli umbra =

In Umbral calculus, the Bernoulli umbra $B_-$ is an umbra, a formal symbol, defined by the relation $\operatorname{eval}B_-^n=B^-_n$, where $\operatorname{eval}$ is the index-lowering operator, also known as evaluation operator and $B^-_n$ are Bernoulli numbers, called moments of the umbra. A similar umbra, defined as $\operatorname{eval}B_+^n=B^+_n$, where $B^+_1=1/2$ is also often used and sometimes called Bernoulli umbra as well. They are related by equality $B_+=B_-+1$. Along with the Euler umbra, Bernoulli umbra is one of the most important umbras.

In Levi-Civita field, Bernoulli umbras can be represented by elements with power series $B_-= \varepsilon^{-1} -\frac{1}{2}-\frac{\varepsilon }{24}+\frac{3 \varepsilon ^3}{640}-\frac{1525 \varepsilon ^5}{580608}+\dotsb$ and $B_+= \varepsilon^{-1} +\frac{1}{2}-\frac{\varepsilon }{24}+\frac{3 \varepsilon ^3}{640}-\frac{1525 \varepsilon ^5}{580608}+\dotsb$, with lowering index operator corresponding to taking the coefficient of $1=\varepsilon^0$ of the power series. The numerators of the terms are given in OEIS A118050 and the denominators are in OEIS A118051. Since the coefficients of $\varepsilon^{-1}$ are non-zero, the both are infinitely large numbers, $B_-$ being infinitely close (but not equal, a bit smaller) to $\varepsilon^{-1}-1/2$ and $B_+$ being infinitely close (a bit smaller) to $\varepsilon^{-1}+1/2$.

In Hardy fields (which are generalizations of Levi-Civita field) umbra $B_+$ corresponds to the germ at infinity of the function $\psi^{-1}(\ln x)$ while $B_-$ corresponds to the germ at infinity of $\psi^{-1}(\ln x)-1$, where $\psi^{-1}(x)$ is inverse digamma function.

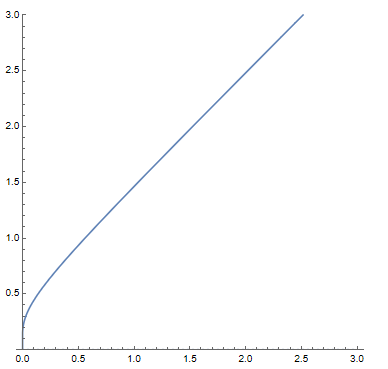
Plot of the function $\psi^{-1}(\ln(x))$, whose germ at positive infinity corresponds to $B_+$.

== Exponentiation ==
Since Bernoulli polynomials is a generalization of Bernoulli numbers, exponentiation of Bernoulli umbra can be expressed via Bernoulli polynomials:

$$\operatorname{eval} (B_-+a)^n=B_n(a),$$

where $a$ is a real or complex number. This can be further generalized using Hurwitz Zeta function:

$$\operatorname{eval} (B_-+a)^p=-p\zeta(1-p,a).$$

From the Riemann functional equation for Zeta function it follows that

$$\operatorname{eval}\,B_+^{-p}=\operatorname{eval}\frac{B_+^{p+1} 2^p\pi^{p+1}}{\sin(\pi p/2)\Gamma(p)(p+1)}$$

== Derivative rule ==
Since $B^+_1=1/2$ and $B^-_1=-1/2$ are the only two members of the sequences $B^+_n$ and $B^-_n$ that differ, the following rule follows for any analytic function $f(x)$:

$$f'(x)=\operatorname{eval}(f(B_++x)-f(B_-+x))=\operatorname{eval} \Delta f(B_-+x)$$

== Elementary functions of Bernoulli umbra ==
As a general rule, the following formula holds for any analytic function $f(x)$:

$$\operatorname{eval}f(B_-+x)=\frac{D}{e^D-1} f(x).$$

This allows to derive expressions for elementary functions of Bernoulli umbra.

$$\operatorname{eval} \cos (z B_-)=\operatorname{eval} \cos (z B_+)=\frac z2 \cot \left(\frac z2\right)$$

$$\operatorname{eval} \cosh (z B_-)=\operatorname{eval} \cosh (z B_+)=\frac z2 \coth \left(\frac z2\right)$$

$$\operatorname{eval} e^{z B_-}=\frac{z}{e^{z}-1}$$

$$\operatorname{eval}\ln ( B_-+z)=\psi(z)$$

Particularly,

$\operatorname{eval}\ln B_+=-\gamma$

$$\operatorname{eval}\frac1{\pi }\ln \left(\frac{ B _+-\frac{z}{\pi }}{ B _-+\frac{z}{\pi }}\right)=\cot z$$

$$\operatorname{eval} \frac1\pi\ln \left(\frac{B _-+1/2 +\frac{z}{\pi }}{B _-+1/2 -\frac{z}{\pi }}\right)=\tan z$$

$$\operatorname{eval}\cos (a B_-+x) = \frac{a}{2} \csc \left(\frac{a}{2}\right) \cos \left(\frac{a}{2}-  x\right)$$

$$\operatorname{eval}\sin (a B_-+x) = \frac{a}{2} \cot \left(\frac{a}{2}\right) \sin x -\frac{a}{2} \cos x$$

Particularly,

$$\operatorname{eval}\sin  B_-=-1/2$$,
$$\operatorname{eval}\sin  B_+=1/2$$,

== Relations between exponential and logarithmic functions ==
Bernoulli umbra allows to establish relations between exponential, trigonometric and hyperbolic functions on one side and logarithms, inverse trigonometric and inverse hyperbolic functions on the other side in closed form:

$$\operatorname{eval}\left(\cosh \left(2 x  B _\pm\right)-1\right)=\operatorname{eval}\frac{x}{\pi} \operatorname{artanh}\left(\frac{x}{\pi B _\pm}\right)=\operatorname{eval}\frac{x}{\pi} \operatorname{arcoth}\left(\frac{\pi   B _\pm}{x}\right)=x \coth (x)-1$$

$$\operatorname{eval}\frac{z}{2\pi }\ln \left(\frac{ B _+-\frac{z}{2\pi }}{ B _-+\frac{z}{2\pi }}\right)=\operatorname{eval} \cos (z B_-)=\operatorname{eval} \cos (z B_+)=\frac z2 \cot \left(\frac z2\right)$$
