= Stability =

Stability may refer to:

== Mathematics ==
- Stability theory, the study of the stability of solutions to differential equations and dynamical systems
  - Asymptotic stability
  - Exponential stability
  - Linear stability
  - Lyapunov stability
  - Marginal stability
  - Orbital stability
  - Structural stability
- Stability (probability), a property of probability distributions
- Stability (learning theory), a property of machine learning algorithms
- Stability, a property of sorting algorithms
- Numerical stability, a property of numerical algorithms which describes how errors in the input data propagate through the algorithm
- Stability radius, a property of continuous polynomial functions
- Stable theory, concerned with the notion of stability in model theory
- Stability, a property of points in geometric invariant theory
- K-Stability, a stability condition for algebraic varieties.
- Bridgeland stability conditions, a class of stability conditions on elements of a triangulated category.
- Stability (algebraic geometry)

== Engineering ==
- BIBO stability (Bounded Input, Bounded Output stability), in signal processing and control theory
- Directional stability, the tendency for a body moving with respect to a medium to point in the direction of motion
- Elastic stability, the resistance of a structural member to buckling
- Flight dynamics, including longitudinal stability
- Nyquist stability criterion, defining the limits of stability for pole-zero analysis in control systems
- Relaxed stability, the property of inherently unstable aircraft
- Ship stability in naval architecture includes
  - Limit of positive stability, the angle at which a boat will no longer stay upright
  - Stability conditions (watercraft) of waterborne vessels
- Slope stability, a property of soil-covered slopes
- Stability model of software design

== Natural sciences ==
- Atmospheric stability, in fluid dynamics, a measure of the turbulence in the ambient atmosphere
- Band of stability, in physics, the scatter distribution of isotopes that do not decay
- Chemical stability, occurring when a substance is in a dynamic chemical equilibrium with its environment
  - Thermal stability of a chemical compound
  - Kinetic stability of a chemical compound
  - Stability constants of complexes, in solution
- Convective instability, a fluid dynamics condition
- Ecological stability, measure of the probability of a population returning quickly to a previous state, or not going extinct
- Homeostasis, a property of a biological system in which variables are regulated so that internal conditions remain stable
- Metastability, stability of an intermediate energy state of a dynamical system above its lowest energy state
- Plasma stability, a measure of how likely a perturbation in a plasma is to be damped out

== Exercise and sports medicine ==
- Core stability of the abdominal muscles
- Joint stability in the musculoskeletal system

== Social sciences ==
- Economic stability, the absence of excessive fluctuations in the macroeconomy
- Hegemonic stability theory, a theory of international relations
- Mertens-stable equilibrium, called "stability" in game theory
- Political stability

== Entertainment ==
- The Stability EP, a 2002 three song EP by Death Cab for Cutie
- "Stability", a song by Debbie Harry from the album Debravation
- "Stability" (short story), by Philip K. Dick

== Other uses ==
- Stability (wine)

== See also ==
- Balance (disambiguation)
- Bicycle and motorcycle dynamics
- Equilibrium (disambiguation)
- Fault-tolerant system
- Instability
- Stabilizer (disambiguation)
- Stable (disambiguation)
- List of types of equilibrium
