= Symbolic method =

In mathematics, the symbolic method in invariant theory is an algorithm developed by Arthur Cayley, Siegfried Heinrich Aronhold, Alfred Clebsch, and Paul Gordan in the 19th century for computing invariants of algebraic forms. It is based on treating the form as if it were a power of a degree one form, which corresponds to embedding a symmetric power of a vector space into the symmetric elements of a tensor product of copies of it.

== Symbolic notation ==
The symbolic method uses a compact, but rather confusing and mysterious notation for invariants, depending on the introduction of new symbols a, b, c, ... (from which the symbolic method gets its name) with apparently contradictory properties.

=== Example: the discriminant of a binary quadratic form ===
These symbols can be explained by the following example from Gordan. Suppose that

$$\displaystyle  f(x) = A_0x_1^2+2A_1x_1x_2+A_2x_2^2$$

is a binary quadratic form with an invariant given by the discriminant

$$\displaystyle \Delta=A_0A_2-A_1^2.$$

The symbolic representation of the discriminant is

$$\displaystyle 2\Delta=(ab)^2$$

where a and b are the symbols. The meaning of the expression (ab)^{2} is as follows. First of all, (ab) is a shorthand form for the determinant of a matrix whose rows are a_{1}, a_{2} and b_{1}, b_{2}, so

$$\displaystyle (ab)=a_1b_2-a_2b_1.$$

Squaring this we get

$$\displaystyle (ab)^2=a_1^2b_2^2-2a_1a_2b_1b_2+a_2^2b_1^2.$$

Next we pretend that

$$\displaystyle f(x)=(a_1x_1+a_2x_2)^2=(b_1x_1+b_2x_2)^2$$

so that

$$\displaystyle  A_i=a_1^{2-i}a_2^{i}= b_1^{2-i}b_2^{i}$$

and we ignore the fact that this does not seem to make sense if f is not a power of a linear form. Substituting these values gives

$$\displaystyle (ab)^2= A_2A_0-2A_1A_1+A_0A_2 = 2\Delta.$$

=== Higher degrees ===
More generally if

$$\displaystyle  f(x) = A_0x_1^n+\binom{n}{1}A_1x_1^{n-1}x_2+\cdots+A_nx_2^n$$

is a binary form of higher degree, then one introduces new variables a_{1}, a_{2}, b_{1}, b_{2}, c_{1}, c_{2}, with the properties

$$f(x)=(a_1x_1+a_2x_2)^n=(b_1x_1+b_2x_2)^n=(c_1x_1+c_2x_2)^n=\cdots.$$

What this means is that the following two vector spaces are naturally isomorphic:

- The vector space of homogeneous polynomials in A_{0},...A_{n} of degree m
- The vector space of polynomials in 2m variables a_{1}, a_{2}, b_{1}, b_{2}, c_{1}, c_{2}, ... that have degree n in each of the m pairs of variables (a_{1}, a_{2}), (b_{1}, b_{2}), (c_{1}, c_{2}), ... and are symmetric under permutations of the m symbols a, b, ....,

The isomorphism is given by mapping a^{n−j}_{1}a^{j}_{2}, b^{n−j}_{1}b^{j}_{2}, .... to A_{j}. This mapping does not preserve products of polynomials.

=== More variables ===
The extension to a form f in more than two variables x_{1}, x_{2}, x_{3},... is similar: one introduces symbols a_{1}, a_{2}, a_{3} and so on with the properties

$$f(x)=(a_1x_1+a_2x_2+a_3x_3+\cdots)^n=(b_1x_1+b_2x_2+b_3x_3+\cdots)^n=(c_1x_1+c_2x_2+c_3x_3+\cdots)^n=\cdots.$$

== Symmetric products ==
The rather mysterious formalism of the symbolic method corresponds to embedding a symmetric product S^{n}(V) of a vector space V into a tensor product of n copies of V, as the elements preserved by the action of the symmetric group. In fact this is done twice, because the invariants of degree n of a quantic of degree m are the invariant elements of S^{n}S^{m}(V), which gets embedded into a tensor product of mn copies of V, as the elements invariant under a wreath product of the two symmetric groups. The brackets of the symbolic method are really invariant linear forms on this tensor product, which give invariants of S^{n}S^{m}(V) by restriction.

== See also ==
- Umbral calculus
