= Theta divisor =

In mathematics, the theta divisor Θ is the divisor in the sense of algebraic geometry defined on an abelian variety A over the complex numbers (and principally polarized) by the zero locus of the associated Riemann theta-function. It is therefore an algebraic subvariety of A of dimension dim A − 1.

== Classical theory ==
Classical results of Bernhard Riemann describe Θ in another way, in the case that A is the Jacobian variety J of an algebraic curve (compact Riemann surface) C. There is, for a choice of base point P on C, a standard mapping of C to J, by means of the interpretation of J as the linear equivalence classes of divisors on C of degree 0. That is, Q on C maps to the class of Q − P. Then since J is an algebraic group, C may be added to itself k times on J, giving rise to subvarieties W_{k}.

If g is the genus of C, Riemann proved that Θ is a translate on J of W_{g − 1}. He also described which points on W_{g − 1} are non-singular: they correspond to the effective divisors D of degree g − 1 with no associated meromorphic functions other than constants. In more classical language, these D do not move in a linear system of divisors on C, in the sense that they do not dominate the polar divisor of a non constant function.

Riemann further proved the Riemann singularity theorem, identifying the multiplicity of a point p = class(D) on W_{g − 1} as the number of linearly independent meromorphic functions with pole divisor dominated by D, or equivalently as h^{0}(O(D)), the number of linearly independent global sections of the holomorphic line bundle associated to D as Cartier divisor on C.

== Later work ==
The Riemann singularity theorem was extended by George Kempf in 1973, building on work of David Mumford and Andreotti - Mayer, to a description of the singularities of points p = class(D) on W_{k} for 1 ≤ k ≤ g − 1. In particular he computed their multiplicities also in terms of the number of independent meromorphic functions associated to D (Riemann-Kempf singularity theorem).

More precisely, Kempf mapped J locally near p to a family of matrices coming from an exact sequence which computes h^{0}(O(D)), in such a way that W_{k} corresponds to the locus of matrices of less than maximal rank. The multiplicity then agrees with that of the point on the corresponding rank locus. Explicitly, if

h^{0}(O(D)) = r + 1,

the multiplicity of W_{k} at class(D) is the binomial coefficient

$${g-k+r \choose r}.$$

When k = g − 1, this is r + 1, Riemann's formula.
