= Module of covariants =

In algebra, given an algebraic group G, a G-module M and a G-algebra A, all over a field k, the module of covariants of type M is the $A^G$-module

$$(M \otimes_k A)^G.$$

where $-^G$ refers to taking the elements fixed by the action of G; thus, $A^G$ is the ring of invariants of A.

== See also ==
- Local cohomology
