= Geometric quotient =

In algebraic geometry, a geometric quotient of an algebraic variety X with the action of an algebraic group G is a morphism of varieties $\pi: X \to Y$ such that

(i) The map $\pi$ is surjective, and its fibers are exactly the G-orbits in X.
(ii) The topology of Y is the quotient topology: a subset $U \subset Y$ is open if and only if $\pi^{-1}(U)$ is open.
(iii) For any open subset $U \subset Y$, $\pi^{\#}: k[U] \to k[\pi^{-1}(U)]^G$ is an isomorphism. (Here, k is the base field.)

The notion appears in geometric invariant theory. (i), (ii) say that Y is an orbit space of X in topology. (iii) may also be phrased as an isomorphism of sheaves $\mathcal{O}_Y \simeq \pi_*(\mathcal{O}_X^G)$. In particular, if X is irreducible, then so is Y and $k(Y) = k(X)^G$: rational functions on Y may be viewed as invariant rational functions on X (i.e., rational-invariants of X).

For example, if H is a closed subgroup of G, then $G/H$ is a geometric quotient. A GIT quotient may or may not be a geometric quotient: but both are categorical quotients, which is unique; in other words, one cannot have both types of quotients (without them being the same).

== Relation to other quotients ==
A geometric quotient is a categorical quotient. This is proved in Mumford's geometric invariant theory.

A geometric quotient is precisely a good quotient whose fibers are orbits of the group.

== Examples ==
- The canonical map $\mathbb{A}^{n+1} \setminus 0 \to \mathbb{P}^n$ is a geometric quotient.
- If L is a linearized line bundle on an algebraic G-variety X, then, writing $X^s_{(0)}$ for the set of stable points with respect to L, the quotient

$X^s_{(0)} \to X^s_{(0)}/G$

is a geometric quotient.
