= Gordan's lemma =

Theorem in convex and algebraic geometry

Gordan's lemma is a lemma in convex geometry and algebraic geometry. It can be stated in several ways.

- Let $A$ be a matrix of integers. Let $M$ be the set of non-negative integer solutions of $A \cdot x = 0$. Then there exists a finite subset of vectors in $M$, such that every element of $M$ is a linear combination of these vectors with non-negative integer coefficients.
- The semigroup of integral points in a rational convex polyhedral cone is finitely generated.
- An affine toric variety is an algebraic variety (this follows from the fact that the prime spectrum of the semigroup algebra of such a semigroup is, by definition, an affine toric variety).

The lemma is named after the mathematician Paul Gordan (1837–1912). Some authors have misspelled it as "Gordon's lemma".

== Proofs ==
There are topological and algebraic proofs.

=== Topological proof ===
Let $\sigma$ be the dual cone of the given rational polyhedral cone. Let $u_1, \dots, u_r$ be integral vectors so that $\sigma = \{ x \mid \langle u_i, x \rangle \ge 0, 1 \le i \le r \}.$ Then the $u_i$'s generate the dual cone $\sigma^{\vee}$; indeed, writing C for the cone generated by $u_i$'s, we have: $\sigma \subset C^{\vee}$, which must be the equality. Now, if x is in the semigroup

$$S_\sigma = \sigma^\vee \cap \mathbb{Z}^d,$$

then it can be written as

$$x = \sum_i n_i u_i + \sum_i r_i u_i,$$

where $n_i$ are nonnegative integers and $0 \le r_i \le 1$. But since x and the first sum on the right-hand side are integral, the second sum is a lattice point in a bounded region, and so there are only finitely many possibilities for the second sum (the topological reason). Hence, $S_{\sigma}$ is finitely generated.

=== Algebraic proof ===
The proof is based on a fact that a semigroup S is finitely generated if and only if its semigroup algebra $\mathbb{C}[S]$ is a finitely generated algebra over $\mathbb{C}$. To prove Gordan's lemma, by induction (cf. the proof above), it is enough to prove the following statement: for any unital subsemigroup S of $\mathbb{Z}^d$,

If S is finitely generated, then $S^+ = S \cap \{ x \mid \langle x, v \rangle \ge 0 \}$, v an integral vector, is finitely generated.

Put $A = \mathbb{C}[S]$, which has a basis $\chi^a, \, a \in S$. It has $\mathbb{Z}$-grading given by

$$A_n = \operatorname{span} \{ \chi^a \mid a \in S, \langle a, v \rangle = n \}$$.

By assumption, A is finitely generated and thus is Noetherian. It follows from the algebraic lemma below that $\mathbb{C}[S^+] = \oplus_0^\infty A_n$ is a finitely generated algebra over $A_0$. Now, the semigroup $S_0 = S \cap \{ x \mid \langle x, v \rangle = 0 \}$ is the image of S under a linear projection, thus finitely generated and so $A_0 = \mathbb{C}[S_0]$ is finitely generated. Hence, $S^+$ is finitely generated then.

Lemma: Let A be a $\mathbb{Z}$-graded ring. If A is a Noetherian ring, then $A^+ = \oplus_0^{\infty} A_n$ is a finitely generated $A_0$-algebra.

Proof: Let I be the ideal of A generated by all homogeneous elements of A of positive degree. Since A is Noetherian, I is actually generated by finitely many $f_i's$, homogeneous of positive degree. If f is homogeneous of positive degree, then we can write $f = \sum_i g_i f_i$ with $g_i$ homogeneous. If f has sufficiently large degree, then each $g_i$ has degree positive and strictly less than that of f. Also, each degree piece $A_n$ is a finitely generated $A_0$-module. (Proof: Let $N_i$ be an increasing chain of finitely generated submodules of $A_n$ with union $A_n$. Then the chain of the ideals $N_i A$ stabilizes in finite steps; so does the chain $N_i = N_i A \cap A_n.$) Thus, by induction on degree, we see $A^+$ is a finitely generated $A_0$-algebra.

== Applications ==
A multi-hypergraph over a certain set $V$ is a multiset of subsets of $V$ (it is called "multi-hypergraph" since each hyperedge may appear more than once). A multi-hypergraph is called regular if all vertices have the same degree. It is called decomposable if it has a proper nonempty subset that is regular too. For any integer n, let $D(n)$ be the maximum degree of an indecomposable multi-hypergraph on n vertices. Gordan's lemma implies that $D(n)$ is finite. Proof: for each subset S of vertices, define a variable x_{S} (a non-negative integer). Define another variable d (a non-negative integer). Consider the following set of n equations (one equation per vertex):
$$\sum_{S\ni v} x_S - d = 0  \text{   for all } v\in V$$
Every solution (x,d) denotes a regular multi-hypergraphs on $V$, where x defines the hyperedges and d is the degree. By Gordan's lemma, the set of solutions is generated by a finite set of solutions, i.e., there is a finite set $M$ of multi-hypergraphs, such that each regular multi-hypergraph is a linear combination of some elements of $M$. Every non-decomposable multi-hypergraph must be in $M$ (since by definition, it cannot be generated by other multi-hypergraph). Hence, the set of non-decomposable multi-hypergraphs is finite.

== See also ==
- Birkhoff algorithm is an algorithm that, given a bistochastic matrix (a matrix which solves a particular set of equations), finds a decomposition of it into integral matrices. It is related to Gordan's lemma in that it shows that the set of these matrices is generated by a finite set of integral matrices.

== See also ==
- Dickson's lemma
