= Zariski's finiteness theorem =

Theorem in algebra

In algebra, Zariski's finiteness theorem gives a positive answer to Hilbert's 14th problem for the polynomial ring in two variables, as a special case. Precisely, it states:

Given a normal domain A, finitely generated as an algebra over a field k, if L is a subfield of the field of fractions of A containing k such that the transcendence degree $\operatorname{tr.deg}_k(L) \le 2$, then the k-subalgebra $L \cap A$ is finitely generated.
