= Stables (surname) =

Stables is a surname. Notable people with the surname include:

- Iain Stables (born 1974), New Zealand TV and Radio personality
- Kelly Stables (born 1978), American actress
- Maggie Stables (died 2014), British actress
- William Gordon Stables (1840–1910), Scottish children's writer
