= Gyroscopic stabilizer =

A Gyroscopic stabilizer is a control system that reduces tilting movement of a ship or aircraft. It senses orientation using a small gyroscope, and counteracts rotation by adjusting control surfaces or by applying force to a large gyroscope. It can be:

- Some active ship stabilizers adjust "active fins" of the ship or apply force to a large gyroscope.

- Anti-rolling gyro, or ship stabilizing gyroscope, applies force to a large gyroscope.

- Gyroscopic autopilot adjusts control surfaces of the aircraft.

== See also ==
- Gyrocompass
