= Pidduck polynomials =

In mathematics, the Pidduck polynomials s_{n}(x) are polynomials introduced by Pidduck given by the generating function

$$\displaystyle \sum_n \frac{s_n(x)}{n!}t^n = \left(\frac{1+t}{1-t}\right)^x(1-t)^{-1}$$

== See also ==
- Umbral calculus
