= Categorical quotient =

In algebraic geometry, given a category C, a categorical quotient of an object X with action of a group G is a morphism $\pi: X \to Y$ that

(i) is invariant; i.e., $\pi \circ \sigma = \pi \circ p_2$ where $\sigma: G \times X \to X$ is the given group action and p_{2} is the projection.
(ii) satisfies the universal property: any morphism $X \to Z$ satisfying (i) uniquely factors through $\pi$.

One of the main motivations for the development of geometric invariant theory was the construction of a categorical quotient for varieties or schemes.

Note $\pi$ need not be surjective. Also, if it exists, a categorical quotient is unique up to a canonical isomorphism. In practice, one takes C to be the category of varieties or the category of schemes over a fixed scheme. A categorical quotient $\pi$ is a universal categorical quotient if it is stable under base change: for any $Y' \to Y$, $\pi': X' = X \times_Y Y' \to Y'$ is a categorical quotient.

A basic result is that geometric quotients (e.g., $G/H$) and GIT quotients (e.g., $X/\!/G$) are categorical quotients.

== See also ==
- Quotient by an equivalence relation
- Quotient stack
