= Siegfried Heinrich Aronhold =

German mathematician (1819–1884)

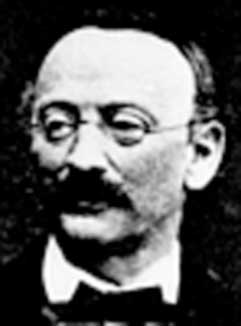
Siegfried Heinrich Aronhold

Siegfried Heinrich Aronhold (16 July 1819 – 13 March 1884) was a German mathematician who worked on invariant theory and introduced the symbolic method. He was born in Angerburg, East Prussia, and died, aged 64, in Berlin, Germany.
