= Cayley's Ω process =

Mathematical process

In mathematics, Cayley's Ω process, introduced by Arthur Cayley (1846), is a relatively invariant differential operator on the general linear group, that is used to construct invariants of a group action.

As a partial differential operator acting on functions of n^{2} variables x_{ij}, the omega operator is given by the determinant

$$\Omega = \begin{vmatrix} \frac{\partial}{\partial x_{11}} & \cdots &\frac{\partial}{\partial x_{1n}} \\ \vdots& \ddots & \vdots\\ \frac{\partial}{\partial x_{n1}} & \cdots &\frac{\partial}{\partial x_{nn}}  \end{vmatrix}.$$

For binary forms f in x_{1}, y_{1} and g in x_{2}, y_{2} the Ω operator is $\frac{\partial^2 fg}{\partial x_1 \partial y_2} - \frac{\partial^2 fg}{\partial x_2 \partial y_1}$. The r-fold Ω process Ω^{r}(f, g) on two forms f and g in the variables x and y is then

1. Convert f to a form in x_{1}, y_{1} and g to a form in x_{2}, y_{2}
2. Apply the Ω operator r times to the function fg, that is, f times g in these four variables
3. Substitute x for x_{1} and x_{2}, y for y_{1} and y_{2} in the result

The result of the r-fold Ω process Ω^{r}(f, g) on the two forms f and g is also called the r-th transvectant and is commonly written (f, g)^{r}.

== Applications ==
Cayley's Ω process appears in Capelli's identity, which Weyl (1946) used to find generators for the invariants of various classical groups acting on natural polynomial algebras.

Hilbert (1890) used Cayley's Ω process in his proof of finite generation of rings of invariants of the general linear group. His use of the Ω process gives an explicit formula for the Reynolds operator of the special linear group.

Cayley's Ω process is used to define transvectants.
