= GIT quotient =

In algebraic geometry, an affine GIT quotient, or affine geometric invariant theory quotient, of an affine scheme $X = \operatorname{Spec} A$ with an action by a group scheme G is the affine scheme $\operatorname{Spec}(A^G)$, the prime spectrum of the ring of invariants of A, and is denoted by $X /\!/ G$. A GIT quotient is a categorical quotient: any invariant morphism uniquely factors through it.

Taking Proj (of a graded ring) instead of $\operatorname{Spec}$, one obtains a projective GIT quotient (which is a quotient of the set of semistable points.)

A GIT quotient is a categorical quotient of the locus of semistable points; i.e., "the" quotient of the semistable locus. Since the categorical quotient is unique, if there is a geometric quotient, then the two notions coincide: for example, one has

$$G / H = G /\!/ H = \operatorname{Spec}\!\big(k[G]^H\big)$$

for an algebraic group G over a field k and closed subgroup H.

If X is a complex smooth projective variety and if G is a reductive complex Lie group, then the GIT quotient of X by G is homeomorphic to the symplectic quotient of X by a maximal compact subgroup of G (Kempf–Ness theorem).

== Construction of a GIT quotient ==
Let G be a reductive group acting on a quasi-projective scheme X over a field and L a linearized ample line bundle on X. Let

$$R = \bigoplus_{n \ge 0} \Gamma(X, L^{\otimes n})$$

be the section ring. By definition, the semistable locus $X^{ss}$ is the complement of the zero set $V(R_+^G)$ in X; in other words, it is the union of all open subsets $U_s = \{ s \ne 0 \}$ for global sections s of $(L^{\otimes n})^G$, n large. By ampleness, each $U_s$ is affine; say $U_s = \operatorname{Spec}(A_s)$ and so we can form the affine GIT quotient

$$\pi_s\colon U_s \to U_s /\!/ G = \operatorname{Spec}(A_s^G).$$

Note that $U_s /\!/ G$ is of finite type by Hilbert's theorem on the ring of invariants. By universal property of categorical quotients, these affine quotients glue and result in

$$\pi\colon X^{ss} \to X /\!/_L G,$$

which is the GIT quotient of X with respect to L. Note that if X is projective; i.e., it is the Proj of R, then the quotient $X /\!/_L G$ is given simply as the Proj of the ring of invariants $R^G$.

The most interesting case is when the stable locus $X^s$ is nonempty; $X^s$ is the open set of semistable points that have finite stabilizers and orbits that are closed in $X^{ss}$. In such a case, the GIT quotient restricts to

$$\pi^s\colon X^s \to X^s/\!/G,$$

which has the property: every fiber is an orbit. That is to say, $\pi^s$ is a genuine quotient (i.e., geometric quotient) and one writes $X^s/G = X^s/\!/G$. Because of this, when $X^s$ is nonempty, the GIT quotient $\pi$ is often referred to as a "compactification" of a geometric quotient of an open subset of X.

A difficult and seemingly open question is: which geometric quotient arises in the above GIT fashion? The question is of a great interest since the GIT approach produces an explicit quotient, as opposed to an abstract quotient, which is hard to compute. One known partial answer to this question is the following: let $X$ be a locally factorial algebraic variety (for example, a smooth variety) with an action of $G$. Suppose there are an open subset $U \subset X$ as well as a geometric quotient $\pi\colon U \to U/G$ such that (1) $\pi$ is an affine morphism and (2) $U/G$ is quasi-projective. Then $U \subset X^s(L)$ for some linearlized line bundle L on X. (An analogous question is to determine which subring is the ring of invariants in some manner.)

== Examples ==
=== Finite group action by $\Z/2\Z$ ===
A simple example of a GIT quotient is given by the $\Z/2\Z$-action on $\Complex[x,y]$ sending

$$\begin{align}
x \mapsto (-x) && y \mapsto (-y)
\end{align}$$

Notice that the monomials $x^2,xy,y^2$ generate the ring $\Complex[x,y]^{\Z/2\Z}$. Hence we can write the ring of invariants as

$$\Complex[x,y]^{\Z/2\Z} = \Complex[x^2,xy,y^2] = \frac{\Complex[a,b,c]}{(ac - b^2)}$$

Scheme theoretically, we get the morphism

$$\mathbb{A}^2 \to \text{Spec}\left(\frac{\Complex[a,b,c]}{(ac - b^2)}\right) =: \mathbb{A}^2/(\Z/2\Z)$$

which is a singular subvariety of $\mathbb{A}^3$ with isolated singularity at $(0,0,0)$. This can be checked using the differentials, which are

$$df = \begin{bmatrix}
c & -2b & a
\end{bmatrix}$$

hence the only point where the differential and the polynomial $f$ both vanish is at the origin. The quotient obtained is a conical surface with an ordinary double point at the origin.

=== Torus action on plane ===
Consider the torus action of $\mathbb{G}_m$ on $X = \mathbb{A}^2$ by $t\cdot (x,y) = (tx,t^{-1}y)$. Note this action has a few orbits: the origin $(0,0)$, the punctured axes, $\{(x,0) : x \neq 0\}, \{(0,y) : y \neq 0\}$, and the affine conics given by $xy = a$ for some $a \in \Complex^*$. Then, the GIT quotient $X//\mathbb{G}_m$ has structure sheaf $\mathcal{O}_{\mathbb{A}^2}^{\mathbb{G}_m}$ which is the subring of polynomials $\mathbb{C}[xy]$, hence it is isomorphic to $\mathbb{A}^1$. This gives the GIT quotient

$\pi\colon \mathbb{A}^2 \to \mathbb{A}^2//\mathbb{G}_m$

Notice the inverse image of the point $(0)$ is given by the orbits $(0,0), \{(x,0) : x \neq 0\}, \{(0,y) : y \neq 0 \}$, showing the GIT quotient isn't necessarily an orbit space. If it were, there would be three origins, a non-separated space.

== See also ==
- quotient stack
- character variety
- Chow quotient
