= Transvectant =

Invariant in mathematics

In mathematical invariant theory, a transvectant is an invariant formed from n invariants in n variables using Cayley's Ω process.

== Definition ==
If Q_{1},...,Q_{n} are functions of n variables x = (x_{1},...,x_{n}) and r ≥ 0 is an integer then the r^{th} transvectant of these functions is a function of n variables given by
$$\operatorname{Tr} \Omega^r(Q_1\otimes\cdots \otimes Q_n)$$
where
$$\Omega = \begin{vmatrix} \frac{\partial}{\partial x_{11}} & \cdots &\frac{\partial}{\partial x_{1n}} \\ \vdots& \ddots & \vdots\\ \frac{\partial}{\partial x_{n1}} & \cdots &\frac{\partial}{\partial x_{nn}}  \end{vmatrix}$$
is Cayley's Ω process, and the tensor product means take a product of functions with different variables x^{1},..., x^{n}, and the trace operator Tr means setting all the vectors x^{k} equal.

== Examples ==
The zeroth transvectant is the product of the n functions.
$$\operatorname{Tr} \Omega^0(Q_1\otimes\cdots \otimes Q_n) = \prod_k Q_k$$
The first transvectant is the Jacobian determinant of the n functions.
$$\operatorname{Tr} \Omega^1(Q_1\otimes\cdots \otimes Q_n) = \det \begin{bmatrix} \partial_k Q_l \end{bmatrix}$$
The second transvectant is a constant times the completely polarized form of the Hessian of the n functions.

When $n = 2$, the binary transvectants have an explicit formula:
$$\operatorname{Tr} \Omega^k( f \otimes g ) = \sum_{l=0}^k (-1)^l \binom kl \partial_x^{k-l} \partial_y^l f \partial_y^{k-l} \partial_l^l g$$
which can be more succinctly written as
$$f \left(\overleftarrow{\partial_{x}} \cdot \overrightarrow{\partial_{y}}-\overleftarrow{\partial_{y}} \cdot \overrightarrow{\partial_{x}}\right)^k g$$
where the arrows denote the function to be taken the derivative of. This notation is used in Moyal product.

== Applications ==
First Fundamental Theorem of Invariant Theory —All polynomial covariants and invariants of any system of binary forms can be expressed as linear combinations of iterated transvectants.
