= Invariant theory =

Mathematical study of invariants under symmetries

Invariant theory is a branch of abstract algebra dealing with actions of groups on algebraic varieties, such as vector spaces, from the point of view of their effect on functions. Classically, the theory dealt with the question of explicit description of polynomial functions that do not change (are invariant) under the transformations from a given linear group. For example, if we consider the action of the special linear group SL_{n} on the space of n by n matrices by left multiplication, then the determinant is an invariant of this action because the determinant of A X equals the determinant of X, when A is in SL_{n}.

== Introduction ==
Let $G$ be a group, and $V$ a finite-dimensional vector space over a field $k$ (which in classical invariant theory was usually assumed to be the complex numbers). A representation of $G$ in $V$ is a group homomorphism $\pi:G \to GL(V)$, which induces a group action of $G$ on $V$. If $k[V]$ is the space of polynomial functions on $V$, then the group action of $G$ on $V$ produces an action on $k[V]$ by the following formula:

$$(g \cdot f)(x) := f(g^{-1} (x)) \qquad \forall x \in V, g \in G, f\in k[V].$$

With this action it is natural to consider the subspace of all polynomial functions which are invariant under this group action, in other words the set of polynomials such that $g\cdot f = f$ for all $g\in G$. This space of invariant polynomials is denoted $k[V]^G$.

First problem of invariant theory: Is $k[V]^G$ a finitely generated algebra over $k$?

For example, if $G=SL_n$ and $V=M_n$ the space of square matrices, and the action of $G$ on $V$ is given by left multiplication, then $k[V]^G$ is isomorphic to a polynomial algebra in one variable, generated by the determinant. In other words, in this case, every invariant polynomial is a linear combination of powers of the determinant polynomial. So in this case, $k[V]^G$ is finitely generated over $k$.

The first problem of invariant theory was answered in the affirmative in a wide generality that includes the case of a finite group acting on a space over a field of characteristic zero, see Hilbert's theorems below.

If the ring of invariants is finitely generated, then the next question is to find a minimal basis. Another question that was asked: given a basis of size $n$, is the module of polynomial relations between the basis elements (known as the syzygies) finitely generated over the ring of polynomials in $n$ variables. The latter question was answered in the affirmative in full generality by virtue of the Hilbert's basis theorem.

Invariant theory of finite groups has intimate connections with Galois theory. One of the first major results was the main theorem on the symmetric functions that described the invariants of the symmetric group $S_n$ acting on the polynomial ring $R[x_1, \ldots, x_n$] by permutations of the variables. More generally, the Chevalley–Shephard–Todd theorem characterizes finite groups whose algebra of invariants is a polynomial ring. Modern research in invariant theory of finite groups emphasizes "effective" results, such as explicit bounds on the degrees of the generators. The case of positive characteristic, ideologically close to modular representation theory, is an area of active study, with links to algebraic topology.

Invariant theory of infinite groups is inextricably linked with the development of linear algebra, especially, the theories of quadratic forms and determinants. Another subject with strong mutual influence was projective geometry, where invariant theory was expected to play a major role in organizing the material. One of the highlights of this relationship is the symbolic method. Representation theory of semisimple Lie groups has its roots in invariant theory.

David Hilbert's work on the question of the finite generation of the algebra of invariants (1890) resulted in the creation of a new mathematical discipline, abstract algebra. A later paper of Hilbert (1893) dealt with the same questions in more constructive and geometric ways, but remained virtually unknown until David Mumford brought these ideas back to life in the 1960s, in a considerably more general and modern form, in his geometric invariant theory. In large measure due to the influence of Mumford, the subject of invariant theory is seen to encompass the theory of actions of linear algebraic groups on affine and projective varieties. A distinct strand of invariant theory, going back to the classical constructive and combinatorial methods of the nineteenth century, has been developed by Gian-Carlo Rota and his school. A prominent example of this circle of ideas is given by the theory of standard monomials.

== Examples ==
Simple examples of invariant theory come from computing the invariant monomials from a group action. For example, consider the $\mathbb{Z}/2\mathbb{Z}$-action on $\mathbb{C}[x,y]$ sending

$$\begin{align}
x\mapsto -x && y \mapsto -y
\end{align}$$

Then, since $x^2,xy,y^2$ are the lowest degree monomials which are invariant, we have that

$$\mathbb{C}[x,y]^{\mathbb{Z}/2\mathbb{Z}} \cong \mathbb{C}[x^2,xy,y^2] \cong \frac{\mathbb{C}[a,b,c]}{(ac - b^2)}$$

This example forms the basis for doing many computations.

== The nineteenth-century origins ==
The theory of invariants came into existence about the middle of the nineteenth century somewhat like Minerva: a grown-up virgin, mailed in the shining armor of algebra, she sprang forth from Cayley's Jovian head.

— Weyl (1939b, p.489)

Cayley first established invariant theory in his "On the Theory of Linear Transformations (1845)." In the opening of his paper, Cayley credits an 1841 paper of George Boole, "investigations were suggested to me by a very elegant paper on the same subject... by Mr Boole." (Boole's paper was Exposition of a General Theory of Linear Transformations, Cambridge Mathematical Journal.)

Classically, the term "invariant theory" refers to the study of invariant algebraic forms (equivalently, symmetric tensors) for the action of linear transformations. This was a major field of study in the latter part of the nineteenth century. Current theories relating to the symmetric group and symmetric functions, commutative algebra, moduli spaces and the representations of Lie groups are rooted in this area.

In greater detail, given a finite-dimensional vector space V of dimension n we can consider the symmetric algebra S(S^{r}(V)) of the polynomials of degree r over V, and the action on it of GL(V). It is actually more accurate to consider the relative invariants of GL(V), or representations of SL(V), if we are going to speak of invariants: that is because a scalar multiple of the identity will act on a tensor of rank r in S(V) through the r-th power 'weight' of the scalar. The point is then to define the subalgebra of invariants I(S^{r}(V)) for the action. We are, in classical language, looking at invariants of n-ary r-ics, where n is the dimension of V. (This is not the same as finding invariants of GL(V) on S(V); this is an uninteresting problem as the only such invariants are constants.) The case that was most studied was invariants of binary forms where n = 2.

Other work included that of Felix Klein in computing the invariant rings of finite group actions on $\mathbf{C}^2$ (the binary polyhedral groups, classified by the ADE classification); these are the coordinate rings of du Val singularities.

Like the Arabian phoenix rising out of its ashes, the theory of invariants, pronounced dead at the turn of the century, is once again at the forefront of mathematics.

— Kung & Rota (1984, p.27)

The work of David Hilbert, proving that I(V) was finitely presented in many cases, almost put an end to classical invariant theory for several decades, though the classical epoch in the subject continued to the final publications of Alfred Young, more than 50 years later. Explicit calculations for particular purposes have been known in modern times (for example Shioda, with the binary octavics).

== Hilbert's theorems ==
Hilbert (1890) proved that if V is a finite-dimensional representation of the complex algebraic group G = SL_{n}(C) then the ring of invariants of G acting on the ring of polynomials R = S(V) is finitely generated. His proof used the Reynolds operator ρ from R to R^{G} with the properties

- ρ(1) = 1
- ρ(a + b) = ρ(a) + ρ(b)
- ρ(ab) = a ρ(b) whenever a is an invariant.

Hilbert constructed the Reynolds operator explicitly using Cayley's omega process Ω, though now it is more common to construct ρ indirectly as follows: for compact groups G, the Reynolds operator is given by taking the average over G, and non-compact reductive groups can be reduced to the case of compact groups using Weyl's unitarian trick.

Given the Reynolds operator, Hilbert's theorem is proved as follows. The ring R is a polynomial ring so is graded by degrees, and the ideal I is defined to be the ideal generated by the homogeneous invariants of positive degrees. By Hilbert's basis theorem the ideal I is finitely generated (as an ideal). Hence, I is finitely generated by finitely many invariants of G (because if we are given any – possibly infinite – subset S that generates a finitely generated ideal I, then I is already generated by some finite subset of S). Let i_{1},...,i_{n} be a finite set of invariants of G generating I (as an ideal). The key idea is to show that these generate the ring R^{G} of invariants. Suppose that x is some homogeneous invariant of degree d > 0. Then

x = a_{1}i_{1} + ... + a_{n}i_{n}

for some a_{j} in the ring R because x is in the ideal I. We can assume that a_{j} is homogeneous of degree d − deg i_{j} for every j (otherwise, we replace a_{j} by its homogeneous component of degree d − deg i_{j}; if we do this for every j, the equation x = a_{1}i_{1} + ... + a_{n}i_{n} will remain valid). Now, applying the Reynolds operator to x = a_{1}i_{1} + ... + a_{n}i_{n} gives

x = ρ(a_{1})i_{1} + ... + ρ(a_{n})i_{n}

We are now going to show that x lies in the R-algebra generated by i_{1},...,i_{n}.

First, let us do this in the case when the elements ρ(a_{k}) all have degree less than d. In this case, they are all in the R-algebra generated by i_{1},...,i_{n} (by our induction assumption). Therefore, x is also in this R-algebra (since x = ρ(a_{1})i_{1} + ... + ρ(a_{n})i_{n}).

In the general case, we cannot be sure that the elements ρ(a_{k}) all have degree less than d. But we can replace each ρ(a_{k}) by its homogeneous component of degree d − deg i_{j}. As a result, these modified ρ(a_{k}) are still G-invariants (because every homogeneous component of a G-invariant is a G-invariant) and have degree less than d (since deg i_{k} > 0). The equation x = ρ(a_{1})i_{1} + ... + ρ(a_{n})i_{n} still holds for our modified ρ(a_{k}), so we can again conclude that x lies in the R-algebra generated by i_{1},...,i_{n}.

Hence, by induction on the degree, all elements of R^{G} are in the R-algebra generated by i_{1},...,i_{n}.

=== Hilbert-Nagata theorem ===
Hilbert's theorem was later generalized as follows. Let a group $G$ act on a finitely-generated algebra $A$ over an arbitrary field $k$. Suppose that:

- The action is locally finite, i.e. the orbit of each $f\in A$ is contained in a finite dimensional $k$-subspace of $A$.
- If $U$ is a finite-dimensional representation of $G$ over $k$, and $H\subset U$ is a $G$-invariant hyperplane, then there exists a $G$-invariant decomposition $U = H\oplus L$.

Then the ring of invariants $A^G$ is finitely generated over $k$.

This theorem implies that if $G$ is a finite group of size prime to the characteristic of $k$ then the invariants ring $A^G$ is finitely generated over $k$. Another corollary is that if $G$ is a reductive group that acts on $A$ algebraically, and $k$ has characteristic zero, then $A^G$ is finitely generated over $k$.

== Geometric invariant theory ==
The modern formulation of geometric invariant theory is due to David Mumford, and emphasizes the construction of a quotient by the group action that should capture invariant information through its coordinate ring. It is a subtle theory, in that success is obtained by excluding some 'bad' orbits and identifying others with 'good' orbits. In a separate development the symbolic method of invariant theory, an apparently heuristic combinatorial notation, has been rehabilitated.

One motivation was to construct moduli spaces in algebraic geometry as quotients of schemes parametrizing marked objects. In the 1970s and 1980s the theory developed interactions with symplectic geometry and equivariant topology, and was used to construct moduli spaces of objects in differential geometry, such as instantons and monopoles.

== See also ==
- Gram's theorem
- Representation theory of finite groups
- Molien series
- Invariant (mathematics)
- Invariant of a binary form
- Invariant measure
- First and second fundamental theorems of invariant theory
