= Moduli scheme =

Moduli space in the category of schemes

In algebraic geometry, a moduli scheme is a moduli space that exists in the category of schemes developed by French mathematician Alexander Grothendieck. Some important moduli problems of algebraic geometry can be satisfactorily solved by means of scheme theory alone, while others require some extension of the 'geometric object' concept (algebraic spaces, algebraic stacks of Michael Artin).

== History ==
Work of Grothendieck and David Mumford (see geometric invariant theory) opened up this area in the early 1960s. The more algebraic and abstract approach to moduli problems is to set them up as a representable functor question, then apply a criterion that singles out the representable functors for schemes. When this programmatic approach works, the result is a fine moduli scheme. Under the influence of more geometric ideas, it suffices to find a scheme that gives the correct geometric points. This is more like the classical idea that the moduli problem is to express the algebraic structure naturally coming with a set (say of isomorphism classes of elliptic curves).

The result is then a coarse moduli scheme. Its lack of refinement is, roughly speaking, that it doesn't guarantee for families of objects what is inherent in the fine moduli scheme. As Mumford pointed out in his book Geometric Invariant Theory, one might want to have the fine version, but there is a technical issue (level structure and other 'markings') that must be addressed to get a question with a chance of having such an answer.

Teruhisa Matsusaka proved a result, now known as Matsusaka's big theorem, establishing a necessary condition on a moduli problem for the existence of a coarse moduli scheme.

== Examples ==
Mumford proved that if g > 1, there exists a coarse moduli scheme of smooth curves of genus g, which is quasi-projective. According to a recent survey by János Kollár, it "has a rich and intriguing intrinsic geometry which is related to major questions in many branches of mathematics and theoretical physics." Braungardt has posed the question whether Belyi's theorem can be generalised to varieties of higher dimension over the field of algebraic numbers, with the formulation that they are generally birational to a finite étale covering of a moduli space of curves.

Using the notion of stable vector bundle, coarse moduli schemes for the vector bundles on any smooth complex variety have been shown to exist, and to be quasi-projective: the statement uses the concept of semistability. It is possible to identify the coarse moduli space of special instanton bundles, in mathematical physics, with objects in the classical geometry of conics, in certain cases.
