= K-stability of Fano varieties =

In mathematics, and in particular algebraic geometry, K-stability is an algebro-geometric stability condition for projective algebraic varieties and complex manifolds. K-stability is of particular importance for the case of Fano varieties, where it is the correct stability condition to allow the formation of moduli spaces, and where it precisely characterises the existence of Kähler–Einstein metrics.

The first attempt to define K-stability for Fano manifolds was made by Gang Tian in 1997, in response to a conjecture of Shing-Tung Yau from 1993 that there should exist a stability condition which characterises the existence of a Kähler–Einstein metric on a Fano manifold. It was defined in reference to the K-energy functional previously introduced by Toshiki Mabuchi. Tian's definition of K-stability was later replaced by a purely algebro-geometric refinement that was first formulated by Simon Donaldson in 2001.

K-stability has become an important notion in the study and classification of Fano varieties. In 2012 Xiuxiong Chen, Donaldson, and Song Sun proved that a smooth Fano manifold is K-polystable if and only if it admits a Kähler–Einstein metric. (Tian then announced a nearly identical proof, under circumstances that resulted in a bitter priority dispute.) This theorem was later generalised to singular K-polystable Fano varieties due to the work of Berman–Boucksom–Jonsson, Li and Liu-Xu-Zhuang. K-stability is important in constructing moduli spaces of Fano varieties, where observations going back to the original development of geometric invariant theory show that it is necessary to restrict to a class of stable objects to form good moduli. It is now known through the work of Chenyang Xu and others that there exists a projective good moduli space of K-polystable Fano varieties. Due to the reformulations of the K-stability condition by Fujita–Li, the K-stability of Fano varieties may be explicitly computed in practice. Which Fano varieties are K-stable is well understood in dimension one, two, and three.

== Definition and characterisations ==
The notion of K-stability for Fano manifolds was originally specified using differential geometry by Tian, who extended the purely analytical notion of the Futaki invariant of a vector field to the case of certain normal varieties with orbifold singularities. This was later reformulated in a purely algebro-geometric form by Donaldson, but this general definition lost a direct link to the geometry of Fano varieties, instead making sense for the broader class of all projective varieties. Work of Tian shows that the Donaldson–Futaki invariant specifying the weight of the $\mathbb{C}^*$-action on the central fibre of a test configuration can be computed in terms of certain intersection numbers (corresponding to the weight of an action on the so-called CM line bundle). In the Fano case these intersection numbers, which involve the anticanonical divisor of the variety and its test configuration, can be given powerful alternative characterisations in terms of the algebraic and birational geometry of the Fano variety.

Thus in the case of Fano varieties, there are many different but equivalent characterisations of K-stability, and some of these characterisations lend themselves to explicit calculation or easier proofs of results.

In this section all definitions are stated in the generality of a $\mathbb{Q}$-Fano variety, which is a Fano variety with ample $\mathbb{Q}$-Cartier anticanonical divisor and at worst Kawamata log terminal (klt) singularities. The definitions of K-stability can be made for any $\mathbb{Q}$-Gorenstein Fano variety (that is, any Fano variety where the anticanonical divisor is $\mathbb{Q}$-Cartier), however it was proven by Odaka that every K-semistable Fano variety has at worst klt singularities, so for the purpose of studying K-stability it suffices to assume at worst klt singularities. Every definition can be extended in a straightforward way to $\mathbb{Q}$-log Fano pairs, a pair $(X,\Delta)$ of a klt variety X and klt divisor such that $-(K_X + \Delta)$ is ample and $\mathbb{Q}$-Cartier.

=== Traditional definition ===
The definition of K-stability for a Fano manifold, or more generally a $\mathbb{Q}$-Fano variety, can be given in many forms. The general definition of K-stability in terms of test configurations (see K-stability for more details) can be simplified if the type of test configuration one considers can be simplified. For example, in the case of toric varieties, one may always take test configurations which are also toric, and this leads to a recharacterisation of K-stability in terms of convex functions on the moment polytope of the toric variety, as was observed by Donaldson in his first paper on K-stability. In the case of Fano manifolds, it was already implicit in the work of Tian that one may restrict to test configurations with a simplified central fibre, in that case where the central fibre is a normal variety.

In this case there exists an intersection-theoretic formula for the Donaldson–Futaki invariant of a normal test configuration $(\mathcal{X},\mathcal{L})$ for $(X,-rK_X)$. Explicitly, one extends the test configuration $(\mathcal{X},\mathcal{L})\to \mathbb{C}$ to a test configuration over the complex projective line $\mathbb{P}^1 = \mathbb{C} \cup \{\infty\}$ trivially at the point $\infty$, one has a formula
$$\operatorname{DF}(\mathcal{X},\mathcal{L}) = \frac{1}{2(n+1)(-K_X)^n} \left( n\left(\frac{1}{r} \mathcal{L}\right)^{n+1} + (n+1) K_{\mathcal{X}/\mathbb{P}^1} \cdot \left( \frac{1}{r} \mathcal{L}\right)^n \right).$$
With respect to this invariant, if $X$ is a $\mathbb{Q}$-Fano variety, we say $X$ is

- K-semistable if $\operatorname{DF}(\mathcal{X},\mathcal{L}) \ge 0$ for any normal test configuration $(\mathcal{X},\mathcal{L})$.
- K-stable if $\operatorname{DF}(\mathcal{X},\mathcal{L}) >0$ for any normal test configuration $(\mathcal{X},\mathcal{L})$ which is not isomorphic to the trivial test configuration $(X\times\mathbb{C}, L)$ outside a set of codimension 2.
- Uniformly K-stable if $\operatorname{DF}(\mathcal{X},\mathcal{L}) \ge \varepsilon \|(\mathcal{X},\mathcal{L})\|_m$ for any normal test configuration $(\mathcal{X},\mathcal{L})$, where $\|(\mathcal{X},\mathcal{L})\|_m$ is the minimum norm of the test configuration $\mathcal{X}$ and $\varepsilon>0$ is a uniform constant depending only on $X$.
- K-unstable if $(X,L)$ is not K-semistable.

According to the above definitions, there are implications

Uniformly K-stable $\implies$ K-stable $\implies$ K-semistable

The above definitions are not well-suited to the situation where the Fano variety $X$ has automorphisms. When the space of automorphisms is positive-dimensional $\dim \operatorname{Aut}(X)>0$, it was observed by Akito Futaki that there are certain test configurations constructed out of the automorphisms of $X$ which are "trivial" for the perspective of testing K-stability. In this case one should restrict to those test configurations which are equivariant with respect to the action of a maximal torus $T\subset \operatorname{Aut}(X)$, and this leads to the notion of K-polystability or reduced K-stability. We say $X$ is

- K-polystable if $\operatorname{DF}(\mathcal{X},\mathcal{L}) \ge 0$ for any test configuration and equality holds precisely when $\mathcal{X}$ is isomorphic to $X\times \mathbb{C}$ outside a set of codimension 2.
- Reduced uniformly K-stable if $\operatorname{DF}(\mathcal{X},\mathcal{L}) \ge \varepsilon \operatorname{J}_T^{\operatorname{NA}}(\mathcal{X},\mathcal{L})$ where $\operatorname{J}_T^{\operatorname{NA}}(\mathcal{X},\mathcal{L})$ is the reduced $\operatorname{J}$-norm of the test configuration.

As for the case where the automorphism group is not positive-dimensional, we have implications

Reduced uniformly K-stable $\implies$ K-polystable $\implies$ K-semistable

The condition of uniform stability is a priori stronger than stability, because it assumes a uniform bound above zero for the Donaldson–Futaki invariant of the test configuration. However it turns out in the case of $\mathbb{Q}$-Fano varieties uniform stability is actually equivalent to stability.

Theorem (Liu–Xu–Zhuang):—(Reduced) uniform K-stability is equivalent to K-(poly)stability for $\mathbb{Q}$-Fano varieties.

Many results can be proved more easily for uniform K-stability because a uniform bound is stronger than a non-uniform bound, so often one works with this definition as opposed to the traditional K-(poly)stability. In the more general case of a polarised variety considered in the article on K-stability it is still an open and important problem to characterise how (reduced) uniform K-stability relates to K-(poly)stability.

=== Special test configurations ===
As mentioned above, sometimes the type of test configuration to be considered can be simplified. In the case of Fano varieties, a special test configuration is a test configuration $(\mathcal{X},\mathcal{L})$ such that we have a rational equivalence of divisors $\mathcal{L} \sim_{\mathbb{Q}} -rK_{\mathcal{X}}$ for some $r$, and the central fibre $\mathcal{X}_0$ is also a $\mathbb{Q}$-Fano variety.

It is proved by Li-Xu that given any test configuration $(\mathcal{X},\mathcal{L})$, there exists a special test configuration $(\mathcal{Y},\mathcal{H})$ such that

$$\operatorname{DF}(\mathcal{Y},\mathcal{H}) \le \operatorname{DF}(\mathcal{X},\mathcal{L}).$$

This implies that for the purposes of testing the K-stability of $X$, it suffices restrict to just looking at the above definitions of K-stability for special test configurations. The fact that one may assume the central fibre of the test configuration is also Fano leads to strong links with birational geometry and the minimal model program, providing a number of alternative characterisations of K-stability described in the following sections.

The main alternative characterisation is in terms of a different notion of Ding stability, which is a variation of the K-stability condition for the Ding invariant

$$\operatorname{Ding}(\mathcal{X},\mathcal{L}) = -\frac{(\frac{1}{r} \mathcal{L})^{n+1}}{(n+1)(-K_X)^n} - 1 + \operatorname{lct}(\mathcal{X},\mathcal{D}_{(\mathcal{X},\mathcal{L})}; \mathcal{X}_0)$$

where one adds on the log canonical threshold of the test configuration. The Ding invariant can only be defined in the setting of Fano varieties. Using this new invariant instead of $\operatorname{DF}$, one can define every notion of Ding stability exactly as above, leading to Ding (semi/poly)stability and uniform versions. The Ding invariant has better formal properties with respect to algebraic geometry than the Donaldson–Futaki invariant. It is known that when a test configuration is special, the Ding invariant agrees with the Donaldson–Futaki invariant up to a constant factor, and so for Fano varieties Ding stability is equivalent to K-stability.

=== Alpha invariant ===
The first known effective criteria to test for K-stability was developed by Tian. Originally Tian's work was designed to directly provide a criterion for the existence of a Kähler–Einstein metric on a Fano manifold, and by later work it is known that every Kähler–Einstein Fano manifold is K-polystable. Tian's original definition of the alpha invariant was analytical in nature, but can be used to verify the existence of a Kähler–Einstein metric in practice.

The alpha invariant of Tian can be defined relative to a group of automorphisms $G$, and the alpha invariant $\alpha_G$ corresponds to the concept of reduced K-stability or K-polystability above. Fix a $G$-invariant Kähler metric $\omega\in c_1(X)$ on a Fano manifold. Define a special class of Kähler potentials by

$$P_G(X,\omega) = \{\varphi\in C^\infty(X, \mathbb{R})\mid \varphi \text{ is } G \text{ invariant}, \sup \varphi = 0, \omega + i \partial \bar \partial \varphi > 0\}.$$

Then the alpha invariant is defined by

$$\alpha_G(X) := \sup \left\{ \alpha > 0 \mid \exists C(\alpha)>0 \text{ such that } \int_X e^{-\alpha \varphi} \omega^n < C(\alpha) \text{ for all } \varphi\in P_G(X,\omega)\right\}.$$
The importance of this invariant is as follows:

Theorem: (Tian)—Let $X$ be a smooth Fano manifold of dimension $\dim X = n$. If the alpha invariant $\alpha_G(X) > \frac{n}{n+1}$ then $X$ admits a $G$-invariant Kähler–Einstein metric.

It was observed by Demailly that the alpha invariant can be given a purely algebro-geometric definition in terms of an infimum of the log canonical threshold over all $\mathbb{Q}$-divisors in the linear systems $\left|-K_X\right|_{\mathbb{Q}}$. Precisely, Demailly showed
$$\alpha(X) = \operatorname{lct}(X) = \inf_{m\in \mathbb{Z}_{>0}} \inf_{D\sim -mK_X} \operatorname{lct}\left(X,\frac{1}{m}D\right).$$
This allows purely algebro-geometric proofs of the existence of Kähler–Einstein metrics. Zhuang later gave an algebraic proof of Tian's theorem for all Fano varieties.

=== Beta invariant ===
The beta invariant $\beta_X(E)$ makes close contact with birational geometry. This invariant was developed by Fujita and Li in an attempt to discover a characterisation of K-stability in terms of divisors or valuations of the Fano variety $X$. This work was inspired by earlier ideas of Ross–Thomas which attempted to describe K-stability in terms of algebraic invariants coming out of subschemes of the variety $X$. Whilst it is not possible to show that this "slope" K-stability is equivalent to K-stability, by passing not just to divisors inside $X$ but divisors inside any birational model over $X$, one obtains "enough" objects to accurately test for K-stability.

In particular Fujita realised that Ross–Thomas's notion of slope K-stability was limited by only integrating up to the Seshadri constant of the subscheme, where the natural divisor on the blow-up becomes ample. By contract the $\beta$-invariant integrates up to the pseudoeffective threshold where the natural divisor has positive volume (since every ample divisor has positive volume, the pseudoeffective threshold goes beyond the Seshadri constant). This extra information gives Fujita and Li's valuative criterion enough information to fully characterise K-stability.

Suppose $X$ is a normal variety with $\mathbb{Q}$-Cartier canonical divisor $K_X$. One says $E$ is a divisor over $X$ if $E$ is a divisor contained inside some normal variety $Y$ such that there exists a proper birational morphism $\mu: Y \to X$ (for example given by a blow up of $X$). One defines the log discrepancy of a divisor $E$ over $X$ as
$$A_X(E) := a(E,X) + 1$$

where $a(E,X)$ is the discrepancy of the divisor $E$ in the sense of birational geometry (see canonical singularity). The discrepancy of a divisor $E$ over $X$ is defined as follows. Away from the exceptional locus of the birational morphism $\mu: Y \to X$, the canonical divisors of $Y$ and $X$ agree. Therefore, their difference is given by some sum of prime divisors $E_i$ contained in the exceptional locus of $\mu$. That is,
$$K_Y - \mu^* K_X = \sum_{i} a_i E_i$$

where $a_i\in \mathbb{Q}$. By definition $a(E_i,X) = -a_i$ and $a(E,X)=0$ when $E$ is not one of the prime divisors $E_i$ in the exceptional locus. The log discrepancy of $X$ measures the singularities of the Fano variety. In particular X is Kawamata log terminal if and only if $A_X(E)\ge 0$ for any $E$ over $X$.

To define the beta invariant, one also needs the a volume term. For a divisor $E$ over $X$, define
$$S_X(E) := \frac{1}{(-K_X)^n} \int_0^{\infty} \operatorname{Vol}(\mu^* (-K_X) - tE) dt.$$

Here the volume of a divisor measures the rate at which its space of sections grows in comparison to the expected dimension. Namely,
$$\operatorname{Vol}(D) = \limsup_{m\to \infty} \frac{\dim H^0(X, \mathcal{O}(mD))}{m^n/n!}$$
where $\dim X = n$.

Finally, the beta invariant was defined by Fujita and Li as
$$\beta_X(E) := A_X(E) - S_X(E).$$

Despite the complicated definition, due to the powerful tools of birational geometry, this invariant may be explicitly computed in practice for many classes of Fano varieties where the structure of divisors in their birational models is known. This can often be achieved with the use of computational algebraic geometry or by-hand calculation.

The relevance of the $\beta$-invariant is in the following characterisation of K-stability first observed (in one direction) by Fujita and Li independently.

Theorem: (Fujita–Li, Blum–Xu)—A $\mathbb{Q}$-Fano variety $X$ is K-semistable if and only if $\beta_X(E)\ge 0$ for all divisors $E$ over $X$. Furthermore $X$ is K-stable if and only if $\beta_X(E)>0$ for all divisors over $X$.

=== Delta invariant ===
The delta invariant can be defined as a "multiplicative" version of the "additive" beta invariant. The delta invariant of a divisor $E$ over $X$ is defined by

$$\delta(X,E) := \frac{A_X(E)}{S_X(E)}.$$

The delta invariant of $X$ is then given by a uniform measurement of the delta invariants of all divisors over $X$.

$$\delta(X) := \inf_{E \text{ over } X} \delta(X,E).$$
The delta invariant of a divisor is conceptually similar to the beta invariant, however it was observed by Fujita–Odaka that one can compute the delta invariant as a limit of "quantized" delta invariants $\delta_m$ as $m\to \infty$. The quantized delta invariants can be computed in terms of m-basis type divisors which are given by choices of bases in the fixed finite-dimensional vector space $H^0(X,-mK_X)$. Thus the delta invariant is generally more computable and more theoretically powerful than its predecessors, and much progress on the explicit computations of K-stability for Fano varieties, and in the theory of moduli of Fano varieties has occurred since its introduction. Its initial importance to the theory of K-stability is captured in the following characterisation.

Theorem: (Fujita–Odaka, Blum–Xu)—A $\mathbb{Q}$-Fano variety $X$ is K-semistable if and only if $\delta(X)\ge 1$. Furthermore it is uniformly K-stable if and only if $\delta(X)>1$.

The algebraic $\delta$-invariant can make contact with the explicit analytical properties of Kähler–Einstein metrics. In particular, one may define the greatest Ricci lower bound $R(X)$ as the supremum of all $0\le t \le 1$ such that there exists a Kähler metric $\omega \in c_1(X)$ such that $\operatorname{Ric}\omega > t \omega$. This is the limit of how far one can traverse the natural continuity method to solve the Kähler–Einstein equation. If the greatest Ricci lower bound takes the value $t=1$ then one can complete the continuity method to derive the existence of a Kähler–Einstein metric. It turns out that precisely how far you can go along this continuity method, the greatest Ricci lower bound, is exactly given by the $\delta$-invariant. That is,
$$R(X) = \min\{1,\delta(X)\}.$$
In the case of toric Fano manifolds an even more geometric interpretation of the delta invariant was derived by Li. For such a toric Fano $X_P$, the origin $O$ is always contained in the interior of the moment polytope $P$. If $B$ denotes the barycentre of the polytope $P$ and $Q$ denotes the point on the boundary of the polytope intersecting the ray $OB$, then Li showed that the greatest Ricci lower bound is given by the ratio $|BQ|/|OQ|$. In particular the toric Fano has $R(X)=1$ if and only if its barycentre is the origin. Interpreted using the delta invariant (and indeed using earlier results), one concludes that a toric Fano manifold is K-stable if and only if the barycentre of its polytope $P$ is the origin.

== Existence of Kähler–Einstein metrics ==
From its initial introduction, the notion of K-stability has been intimately linked to the existence of Kähler–Einstein metrics on Fano manifolds. There are now many theorems which relate certain K-stability assumptions to the existence of solutions. These conjectures fall broadly under the title of the Yau–Tian–Donaldson conjecture. In the case of Fano varieties this conjecture asserts:

Conjecture (Yau–Tian–Donaldson)—A Fano manifold admits a Kähler–Einstein metric if and only if it is K-polystable.

For Fano manifolds this conjecture was originally proposed by Yau and Tian, and a more general form was stated by Donaldson which extends beyond just the case of Fano manifolds. Nevertheless, the conjecture even in the case of Fanos has come to be known as the Yau–Tian–Donaldson conjecture. See K-stability for more discussion of the general conjecture.

In the case of Fano manifolds, the YTD conjecture admits generalisations beyond the case of smooth varieties and forms of the conjecture are now known for singular Fanos and log Fanos.

=== Smooth Fano varieties ===
The forward direction of the conjecture, that a Fano manifold with a Kähler–Einstein metric is K-polystable, was proven by Tian in his original paper when the Fano manifold has a discrete automorphism group, that is, $\left|\operatorname{Aut}(X)\right| < \infty$. This direction was proven in full generality, removing the assumption that the automorphism group was discrete, by Berman.

The reverse direction of the Yau–Tian–Donaldson conjecture was first resolved in the smooth case as stated above by Chen–Donaldson–Sun, and at the same time by Tian. Chen, Donaldson, and Sun have alleged that Tian's claim to equal priority for the proof is incorrect, and they have accused him of academic misconduct. (Note: Xiuxiong Chen, Simon Donaldson, Song Sun. "On some recent developments in Kähler geometry.") Tian has disputed their claims. (Note: Gang Tian. "Response to CDS" and "More comments on CDS.") Chen, Donaldson, and Sun were recognized by the American Mathematical Society's prestigious 2019 Veblen Prize as having had resolved the conjecture. The Breakthrough Prize has recognized Donaldson with the Breakthrough Prize in Mathematics and Sun with the New Horizons Breakthrough Prize, in part based upon their work with Chen on the conjecture.

Theorem—If a Fano manifold is K-polystable, then it admits a Kähler–Einstein metric.

The proofs of Chen–Donaldson–Sun and Tian were based on a delicate study of Gromov–Hausdorff limits of Fano manifolds with Ricci curvature bounds. More recently, a proof based on the "classical" continuity method was provided by Ved Datar and Gabor Székelyhidi, followed by a proof by Chen, Sun, and Bing Wang using the Kähler–Ricci flow.

Robert Berman, Sébastien Boucksom, and Mattias Jonsson also provided a proof from a new variational approach, which interprets K-stability in terms of Non-Archimedean geometry. Of particular interest is that the proof of Berman–Boucksom–Jonsson also applies to the case of a smooth log Fano pair, and does not use the notion of K-polystability but of uniform K-stability as introduced by Dervan and Boucksom–Hisamoto–Jonsson. It is now known that uniform K-stability is equivalent to K-stability and so BBJ's proof provides a new proof of the full YTD conjecture.

Building on the variational techniques Berman–Boucksom–Jonsson and the so-called quantized delta invariants of Fujita–Odaka, Zhang produced a short quantization-based proof of the YTD conjecture for smooth Fano manifolds.

Using other techniques entirely, Berman has also produced a proof of a YTD-type conjecture using a thermodynamic approach called uniform Gibbs stability, where a Kähler–Einstein metric is constructed through a random point process.

=== Singular Fano varieties and weak Kähler–Einstein metrics ===
For smoothable Fano varieties, the proof of Yau-Tian-Donaldson conjecture was first given by Spotti-Sun-Yao. The new proof of the Yau–Tian–Donaldson conjecture by Berman–Boucksom–Jonsson using variational techniques opened up the possible study of K-stability and Kähler–Einstein metrics for general singular Fano varieties. The variational techniques used rely on uniform K-stability as described above.

The result of Berman that a Fano manifold admitting a Kähler–Einstein metric is K-polystable was proven in the full generality of a $\mathbb{Q}$-log Fano pair, admitting a weak Kähler–Einstein metric. A weak Kähler–Einstein metric on a $\mathbb{Q}$-Fano variety $X$ is a positive $(1,1)$-current $\theta_{\operatorname{KE}}$which restricts to give a smooth Kähler–Einstein metric $\omega_{\operatorname{KE}}$on the smooth locus $X_{\operatorname{reg}}$ of $X$. By requiring a compatibility with a divisor $\Delta$, this definition can be extended to a weak Kähler–Einstein metric on a pair $(X,\Delta)$.

In this generality, the reverse direction of the YTD conjecture was proven by Li–Tian–Wang in the case where the automorphism group is discrete, and in full generality by Li.

Theorem (Li–Tian–Wang, Li)—A $\mathbb{Q}$-log Fano pair $(X,\Delta)$ which is reduced uniformly K-stable admits a weak Kähler–Einstein metric.

By the resolution of the finite generation conjecture by Liu–Xu–Zhuang it is known that reduced uniform K-stability is equivalent to K-polystability, so combined with Berman's result the Yau–Tian–Donaldson conjecture is true in complete generality for singular Fano varieties.

Theorem (Li–Tian–Wang, Li, Berman, Liu–Xu–Zhuang)—A $\mathbb{Q}$-log Fano pair $(X,\Delta)$ admits a weak Kähler–Einstein metric if and only if it is K-polystable.

== Moduli spaces of K-stable Fano varieties ==
The construction of moduli spaces is a central problem in algebraic geometry. The construction of moduli of algebraic curves spurred the development of geometric invariant theory, stacks, and classification of algebraic surfaces has motivated results throughout algebraic geometry. The case of moduli spaces of canonically polarised varieties was settled using techniques arising from the minimal model program by Kollár–Shepherd-Barron leading to the so-called KSB moduli spaces of varieties of general type. A key property of varieties of general type which allow the construction of moduli is the lack of automorphisms of such varieties. This does not hold for Fano varieties, which can often have very large automorphism groups, so the minimal model program did not directly find applications to the construction of moduli of Fano varieties, and it became clear that K-stability was the correct algebro-geometric notion to allow the formation of moduli in this case. Moduli spaces of K-stable varieties are known as K-moduli.

The K-moduli space was first constructed as a compactification of the moduli of K-polystable Fano manifolds by Li–Wang–Xu and Odaka. This construction crucially depends on earlier work by Donaldson-Sun, and therefore relies on techniques from differential geometry. The Zariski openness of K-polystable Fano manifolds was proved earlier by Odaka and Donaldson. An interesting question that subsequently arose was whether one could provide a purely algebraic construction of K-moduli space, one that would also accommodate more general singularities.

The standard algebraic technique to construct moduli spaces utilizes geometric invariant theory. Typically to apply Mumford's geometric invariant theory to construct moduli, one must embed a family of varieties inside a fixed finite-dimensional projective space. Such a family then defines a locus of points in the corresponding Hilbert scheme of the projective space, which is a projective scheme on which the group of projective automorphisms act. GIT stability with respect to this linearisation is called Hilbert stability. If this locus forms an open set, then GIT may be used to construct a quotient which parametrises these objects. In good circumstances this quotient may be proper and projective.

It is not always possible to embed a family of varieties inside a fixed projective space and therefore describe their moduli with geometric invariant theory, and this special property is called boundedness. A fundamental property of Fano varieties is that they fail to be bounded, and thus their stability cannot be reasonably captured by any finite-dimensional geometric invariant theory. This explains why K-stability requires one to consider test configurations $(\mathcal{X},\mathcal{L})$ for which the relatively ample line bundle $\mathcal{L}$ can correspond to some power $L^k$ for $k$ arbitrarily large. It was proven by Jiang, using works of Caucher Birkar, that K-semistable $\mathbb{Q}$-Fano varieties with volume bounded below form a bounded family. Thus for a given volume $V>0$ there exists a uniform integer $N>0$ such that every K-semistable $\mathbb{Q}$-Fano with anticanonical volume larger than or equal to $V$ admits an embedding inside the fixed projective space $\mathbb{CP}^N$. The openness of this locus of K-semistable Fanos was proven by Blum–Liu–Xu and Xu. This implies the existence of an Artin stack of finite type denoted $\mathfrak{X}_{n,V}^{\operatorname{Kss}}$ parametrising K-semistable $\mathbb{Q}$-Fano varieties with volume bounded below by $V$.

In order to find a genuine moduli space as a separated algebraic space, by Alpher-Halper-Leistner-Heinloth, one must prove certain properties about S-completeness and $\Theta$-reductivity of K-semistable Fanos inside the stack $\mathfrak{X}_{n,V}^{\operatorname{Kss}}$. It is proved by Blum-Xu and Alper-Blum-Halpern-Leistner-Xu that these properties of the moduli stack are true and there exists a good moduli space $X_{n,V}^{\operatorname{Kps}}$ for the stack $\mathfrak{X}_{n,V}^{\operatorname{Kss}}$ which parametrises K-polystable $\mathbb{Q}$-Fano varieties with volume bounded below by $V$.

The Higher Rank Finite Generation is established by Liu-Xu-Zhuang. As a consequence, $X_{n,V}^{\operatorname{Kps}}$ is proper. Moreover, combined with the earlier works of Codogni-Patakfalvi and Xu-Zhuang, the CM-line bundle is ample, meaning the good moduli space is also projective. The existence result for K-moduli can be summarised in the following theorem.

Theorem—There exists a separated, proper, projective, good moduli space $X_{n,V}^{\operatorname{Kps}}$ parametrising $n$-dimensional K-polystable $\mathbb{Q}$-Fano varieties with anticanonical volume bounded below by $V>0$.

== Explicit K-stability of Fano varieties ==
The explicit study of K-stable Fano varieties precedes the algebraic notion of K-stability, and in low dimensions was of interest purely due to the study of Kähler–Einstein manifolds. For example, either by explicit construction or the use the Tian's alpha invariant, all smooth Kähler–Einstein manifolds of dimension 1 and 2 were known before the definition of K-stability was introduced. In dimension 3 and higher explicit constructions of Kähler–Einstein metrics become more difficult, but advances arising out of the algebraic study of K-stability have enabled explicit computations of K-polystable Fano threefolds and certain families of higher dimensional varieties, and subsequently the discovery of new Kähler–Einstein manifolds.

=== Dimension 1 ===
In dimension one there is a unique smooth Fano variety, the complex projective line $\mathbb{CP}^1$. This variety is easily seen to be K-stable due to the existence of the Fubini–Study metric, which is a Kähler–Einstein metric, implying the K-polystability of $\mathbb{CP}^1$. A purely algebro-geometric proof of the K-stability of smooth Riemann surfaces follows from the work of Ross–Thomas on slope K-stability, which is equivalent to K-stability in dimension one. In this case one may construct test configurations out of collections of points on the curve, and when the curve is smooth no points destabilise.

=== Dimension 2 ===
In dimension two the spaces which admit Kähler–Einstein metrics were classified by Tian. There are 10 deformation families of smooth Fano varieties in dimension two, the del Pezzo surfaces. Using the alpha invariant, Tian showed that a smooth Fano surface admits a Kähler–Einstein metric and is K-polystable if and only if it is not the blow up of the complex projective plane $\mathbb{CP}^2$ in one or two points. Thus 8 out of these 10 classes consist of K-polystable Fano surfaces.

The K-moduli of Fano surfaces were studied in explicit examples by Tian and Mabuchi–Mukai. Explicit constructions of compact moduli spaces of Kähler–Einstein Fano surfaces were achieved by Odaka–Spotti–Sun. These spaces were constructed as Gromov–Hausdorff compactifications but were identified with explicit algebraic spaces of log Fano surfaces. The result of Odaka–Spotti–Sun was based on a new "moduli continuity method", which bypasses the explicit verification of the K-polystability condition and instead relies on modifying GIT moduli spaces, guided by considerations of K-stability.

For example, it is proven by Odaka–Spotti–Sun that the compact moduli space of smoothable Kähler–Einstein surfaces of degree four is given by the weighted projective space $\mathbb{P}(1,2,3)$ with the smooth Kähler–Einstein surfaces of degree four corresponding to the locus $\mathbb{P}(1,2,3)\backslash D$ where $D$ is an ample divisor consisting of those points satisfying the equation $z_1^2 = 128 z_2$.

=== Dimension 3 ===
In dimension 3 purely algebraic techniques can be used to find examples of K-stable Fano varieties which are not a priori known to admit Kähler–Einstein metrics. The Iskovskikh–Mori–Mukai classification of smooth Fano threefolds provides a natural way of breaking down the problem of studying K-stable Fano threefolds into its components. It is known that there are 105 deformation families of smooth Fano threefolds, and explicit computations using Fujita–Li's beta invariant and Fujita–Odaka's delta invariant can be used to determine which deformation families contain K-stable representatives.

For every deformation family it is known whether the generic element of the family is K-(poly)stable. In particular it is known that 78 out of 105 families contain a K-polystable representative in their deformation class. For 71 out of 105 families, it is known for every single member of the deformation class whether or not it is K-polystable. For many examples of the 105 deformation families, the K-stability of representative threefolds can be interpreted in terms of a natural GIT problem which describes that family, and so explicit examples of K-moduli of Fano threefolds can also be found as GIT quotients.

For some classes of Fano threefolds the classification problem remains open. For example, it is known that the Mukai–Umemura threefold $X_{\operatorname{MU}}$ in the deformation class $V_{22}$ admits a Kähler–Einstein metric and is therefore K-polystable by work of Donaldson, who computed Tian's alpha invariant explicitly using the criterion above. This manifold has non-discrete automorphism group $\operatorname{SL}(2,\mathbb{C})$ and which nearby deformations of $X_{\operatorname{MU}}$ are also K-polystable is not known. It is conjectured that the deformations corresponding to GIT-polystable points within the versal deformation space of $\mathbb{X}_{\operatorname{MU}}$ should correspond to nearby K-polystable varieties.

=== Higher dimensions ===
The first and simplest example of a K-polystable Fano manifold in any dimension is complex projective space, which always admits the Fubini–Study metric which is Kähler–Einstein in any dimension and therefore all projective spaces are K-polystable.

In general there are not many such "obvious" Kähler–Einstein metrics in higher dimensions, and one must use recent techniques of stability to find examples. For certain families of Fano varieties, K-stability can be proved in higher dimensions using either analytic techniques through the alpha invariant or purely algebro-geometric techniques with the beta or delta invariants. As an example, a Fermat hypersurface is a variety of the form
$$F_{n,d} = \left\{z\in \mathbb{CP}^{n+1} \mid z_0^d + \cdots + z_{n+1}^d = 0\right\} \subset \mathbb{CP}^{n+1}.$$
These hypersurfaces are smooth Fano manifolds with discrete automorphism group for $3 \le d \le n+1$, and it was proven by Tian using the alpha invariant that $\alpha_G (F_{n,d}) > \frac{2}{n+2-d}$ implying $F_{n,d}$ admits a Kähler–Einstein for $n\le d \le n+1$, and using more detailed arguments Tian proved the existence of a Kähler–Einstein metric when $d\le n$. On the other hand, using the delta invariant Zhuang gave a completely algebraic proof that $F_{n,d}$ is K-stable for $3\le d \le n+1$ and therefore admits a Kähler–Einstein metric in these cases. Using the openness results for uniform K-stability and K-semistability, one can conclude from this that the generic smooth hypersurface of degree $3\le d \le n+1$ inside $\mathbb{CP}^{n+1}$ is K-stable. In some cases it is in fact known that all degree $d$ hypersurfaces are K-stable, such as all $d=n,n+1$ smooth hypersurfaces in $\mathbb{CP}^{n+1}$.

In addition to the study of particular Fano varieties, in certain settings K-moduli may be explicitly described in higher dimensions. For example, when the K-moduli admits an "obvious" GIT interpretation, the algebraic tools of beta or delta invariants can be used to verify that GIT stability is equivalent to K-stability for that particular problem. For example, Liu used the moduli continuity method to show that for cubic fourfold hypersurfaces in $\mathbb{CP}^5$, the GIT moduli space of (possibly singular) cubic fourfolds is isomorphic to the K-moduli space, and thus one obtains an explicit description of the K-stable, K-polystable, and K-semistable cubic fourfolds in terms of their GIT stability and singularity structure. In particular every smooth cubic fourfold is K-stable.
