= Approximation property (ring theory) =

In algebra, a commutative Noetherian ring A is said to have the approximation property with respect to an ideal I if each finite system of polynomial equations with coefficients in A has a solution in A if and only if it has a solution in the I-adic completion of A. The notion of the approximation property is due to Michael Artin.

== See also ==
- Artin approximation theorem
- Popescu's theorem
