= Sébastien Boucksom =

French mathematician

Sébastien Boucksom (born 26 August 1976 in Roubaix) is a French mathematician.

Boucksom studied at the École normale supérieure de Lyon from 1996 to 1999, when he qualified with his agrégation in mathematics. He received his doctorate in 2002 from the Institut Fourier of the Université Grenoble Alpes with thesis Cônes positifs des variétés complexes compactes under the supervision of Jean-Pierre Demailly. As a postdoc Boucksom studied with Simon Donaldson at Imperial College London. From 2003 he did research for the CNRS at the Institut de Mathématiques de Jussieu of the CNRS and the University of Paris VI. Since 2010 he has been a part-time professor at the École Polytechnique and since 2014 a directeur de recherche of the CNRS at the Center de Mathématiques Laurent Schwartz of the École Polytechnique.

Boucksom's research deals with algebraic geometry, geometry of p-adic algebraic varieties, and Kähler manifolds. Ideas introduced by Boucksom and collaborators Berman and Jonsson using non-Archimedean geometry to study Kähler manifolds have been very influential in the study of K-stability of Fano varieties.

In 2014, the French Academy of Sciences awarded him the Prix Paul Doistau–Émile Blutet. The laudation cited his work on positive fluxes in compact Kähler manifolds with application to characterization of pseudo-effective cones, as well as his work on the Monge-Ampère equation with application to the existence of Kähler-Einstein metrics with minimal singularities. With Berman and Nyström, he proved a version of the Fekete problem in pluripotential theory. (An algorithmic version of the Fekete problem is problem number 7 of Smale's problems.)

In 2018, Boucksom was an Invited Speaker with talk Variational and non-Archimedean aspects of the Yau-Tian-Donaldson conjecture at the International Congress of Mathematicians in Rio de Janeiro.

== Selected publications ==
- Boucksom, Sébastien; Eyssidieux, Philippe; Guedj, Vincent (2013). An Introduction to the Kähler-Ricci flow. Cham, Switzerland: Springer. ISBN 978-3-319-00819-6. OCLC 859522979.
- Berman, Robert; Boucksom, Sébastien (11 May 2010). "Growth of balls of holomorphic sections and energy at equilibrium". Inventiones Mathematicae. 181 (2). Springer Science and Business Media LLC: 337–394. arXiv:0803.1950. Bibcode:2010InMat.181..337B. doi:10.1007/s00222-010-0248-9. ISSN 0020-9910. S2CID 16186301.
- Boucksom, Sébastien; Favre, Charles; Jonsson, Mattias (22 May 2014). "Solution to a non-Archimedean Monge-Ampère equation". Journal of the American Mathematical Society. 28 (3). American Mathematical Society (AMS): 617–667. arXiv:1201.0188. doi:10.1090/s0894-0347-2014-00806-7. ISSN 0894-0347. S2CID 119153225.
- Boucksom, Sébastien; Hisamoto, Tomoyuki; Jonsson, Mattias (24 May 2019). "Uniform K-stability and asymptotics of energy functionals in Kähler geometry". Journal of the European Mathematical Society. 21 (9). European Mathematical Society - EMS - Publishing House GmbH: 2905–2944. arXiv:1603.01026. doi:10.4171/jems/894. ISSN 1435-9855. S2CID 54182600.
