= Moduli space =

Geometric space whose points represent algebro-geometric objects of some fixed kind

In mathematics, in particular algebraic geometry, a moduli space is a geometric space (usually a scheme or an algebraic stack) whose points represent algebro-geometric objects of some fixed kind, or isomorphism classes of such objects. Such spaces frequently arise as solutions to classification problems: If one can show that a collection of interesting objects (e.g., the smooth algebraic curves of a fixed genus) can be given the structure of a geometric space, then one can parametrize such objects by introducing coordinates on the resulting space. In this context, the term "modulus" is used synonymously with "parameter"; moduli spaces were first understood as spaces of parameters rather than as spaces of objects. A variant of moduli spaces is formal moduli. Bernhard Riemann first used the term "moduli" in 1857.

== Motivation ==
Every point of a moduli space corresponds to a solution of a given geometric problem. Two different solutions correspond to the same point if they are isomorphic (that is, geometrically the same). A moduli space can be thought of as giving a universal space of parameters for the problem.

For example, consider the problem of finding all circles in the Euclidean plane up to congruence. Any circle can be described uniquely by giving three points, but many different sets of three points give the same circle: the correspondence is many-to-one. However, circles are uniquely parameterized by giving their center and radius: this is two real parameters and one positive real parameter. Since we are only interested in circles "up to congruence", we identify circles having different centers but the same radius, and so the radius alone suffices to parameterize the set of interest. The moduli space is, therefore, the positive real numbers.

Moduli spaces often carry natural geometric and topological structures as well. In the example of circles, for instance, the moduli space is not just an abstract set, but the absolute value of the difference of the radii defines a metric for determining when two circles are "close". The geometric structure of moduli spaces locally tells us when two solutions of a geometric classification problem are "close", but generally moduli spaces also have a complicated global structure as well.

$\mathbb{P}^1(\mathbb{R})$ is the space of lines through the origin of the real plane. Every line intersects the unit circle $S^1$in two places, so is uniquely identified by an angle $0\leq \theta < \pi$ or, equivalently, as a pair of opposite points on $S^1$.

For example, consider how to describe the collection of lines in $\mathbb{R}^2$ that intersect the origin. We want to assign to each line $L$ of this family a quantity that can uniquely identify it—a modulus. An example of such a quantity is the positive angle $\theta(L)$ with $0\leq \theta < \pi$ radians. The set of lines so parametrized is known as $\mathbb{P}^1(\mathbb{R})$ and is called the real projective line.

We can also describe the collection of lines in $\mathbb{R}^2$ that intersect the origin by means of a topological construction. To wit: consider the unit circle $S^1 \subseteq \mathbb{R}^2$ and notice that for every point $s \in S^1$ there is a unique line joining the origin and $s$. However, this is also the line we'd get from looking at $-s$, so we identify opposite points via an equivalence relation $\sim$ to yield $\mathbb{P}^1 \cong S^1 / \sim$ , with the quotient topology.

Thus, when we consider $\mathbb{P}^1(\mathbb{R})$ as a moduli space of lines that intersect the origin in $\mathbb{R}^2$, we capture the ways in which the members (lines in this case) of the family can modulate by continuously varying the angle $\theta$.

== Basic examples ==
=== Projective space and Grassmannians ===
Real projective space $\mathbb{P}^n(\mathbb{R})$ is the moduli space of lines through the origin in $\mathbb{R}^{n+1}$. Similarly, complex projective space $\mathbb{P}^n(\mathbb{C})$ is the space of all complex lines through the origin in $\mathbb{C}^{n+1}$.

More generally, the Grassmannian $\mathbf{Gr}(k, V)$ of a vector space $V$ is the moduli space of all $k$-dimensional linear subspaces of V.

==== Projective space as moduli of very ample line bundles generated by global sections ====
Whenever there is an embedding of a scheme $X$ into the universal projective space $\mathbf{P}^n_\mathbb{Z}$, the embedding is given by a line bundle $\mathcal{L} \to X$ and $n+1$ sections $s_0,\ldots,s_n\in\Gamma(X,\mathcal{L})$ which don't all vanish at the same time. This means, given a point

$x:\text{Spec}(R) \to X$

there is an associated point

$\hat{x}:\text{Spec}(R) \to \mathbf{P}^n_\mathbb{Z}$

given by the compositions

$[s_0:\cdots:s_n]\circ x = [s_0(x):\cdots:s_n(x)] \in \mathbf{P}^n_\mathbb{Z}(R)$

Then, two line bundles with sections are equivalent

$(\mathcal{L},(s_0,\ldots,s_n))\sim (\mathcal{L}',(s_0',\ldots,s_n'))$

iff there is an isomorphism $\phi:\mathcal{L} \to \mathcal{L}'$ such that $\phi(s_i) = s_i'$. This means the associated moduli functor

$\mathbf{P}^n_\mathbb{Z}:\text{Sch}\to \text{Sets}$

sends a scheme $X$ to the set

$$\mathbf{P}^n_\mathbb{Z}(X) =\left\{
(\mathcal{L},s_0,\ldots,s_n) : \begin{matrix}
\mathcal{L} \to X \text{ is a line bundle} \\
s_0,\ldots,s_n\in\Gamma(X,\mathcal{L}) \\
\text{ form a basis of global sections}
\end{matrix}
\right\} / \sim$$

Showing this is true can be done by running through a series of tautologies: any projective embedding $i:X \to \mathbb{P}^n_\mathbb{Z}$ gives the globally generated sheaf $i^*\mathcal{O}_{\mathbf{P}^n_\mathbb{Z}}(1)$ with sections $i^*x_0,\ldots,i^*x_n$. Conversely, given an ample line bundle $\mathcal{L} \to X$ globally generated by $n+1$ sections gives an embedding as above.

=== Chow variety ===
The Chow variety Chow(d,P^{3}) is a projective algebraic variety which parametrizes degree d curves in P^{3}. It is constructed as follows. Let C be a curve of degree d in P^{3}, then consider all the lines in P^{3} that intersect the curve C. This is a degree d divisor D_{C} in G(2, 4), the Grassmannian of lines in P^{3}. When C varies, by associating C to D_{C}, we obtain a parameter space of degree d curves as a subset of the space of degree d divisors of the Grassmannian: Chow(d,P^{3}).

=== Hilbert scheme ===
The Hilbert scheme Hilb(X) is a moduli scheme. Every closed point of Hilb(X) corresponds to a closed subscheme of a fixed scheme X, and every closed subscheme is represented by such a point. A simple example of a Hilbert scheme is the Hilbert scheme parameterizing degree $d$ hypersurfaces of projective space $\mathbb{P}^n$. This is given by the projective bundle

$\mathcal{Hilb}_d(\mathbb{P}^n) = \mathbb{P}(\Gamma(\mathcal{O}(d)))$

with universal family given by

$\mathcal{U} = \{ (V(f), f) : f \in \Gamma(\mathcal{O}(d)) \}$

where $V(f)$ is the associated projective scheme for the degree $d$ homogeneous polynomial $f$.

== Definitions ==
There are several related notions of things we could call moduli spaces. Each of these definitions formalizes a different notion of what it means for the points of space M to represent geometric objects.

=== Fine moduli space ===
This is the standard concept. Heuristically, if we have a space M for which each point m ∊ M corresponds to an algebro-geometric object U_{m}, then we can assemble these objects into a tautological bundle U over M. (For example, the Grassmannian G(k, V) carries a rank k bundle whose fiber at any point [L] ∊ G(k, V) is simply the linear subspace L ⊂ V.) M is called a base space of the family U. We say that such a family is universal if any family of algebro-geometric objects T over any base space B is the pullback of U along a unique map B → M. A fine moduli space is a space M which is the base of a universal family.

More precisely, suppose that we have a functor F from schemes to sets, which assigns to a scheme B the set of all suitable families of objects with base B. A space M is a fine moduli space for the functor F if M represents F, i.e., there is a natural isomorphism τ : F → Hom(−, M), where Hom(−, M) is the functor of points. This implies that M carries a universal family; this family is the family on M corresponding to the identity map 1_{M} ∊ Hom(M, M).

=== Coarse moduli space ===
Fine moduli spaces are desirable, but they do not always exist and are frequently difficult to construct, so mathematicians sometimes use a weaker notion, the idea of a coarse moduli space. A space M is a coarse moduli space for the functor F if there exists a natural transformation τ : F → Hom(−, M) and τ is universal among such natural transformations. More concretely, M is a coarse moduli space for F if any family T over a base B gives rise to a map φ_{T} : B → M and any two objects V and W (regarded as families over a point) correspond to the same point of M if and only if V and W are isomorphic. Thus, M is a space which has a point for every object that could appear in a family, and whose geometry reflects the ways objects can vary in families. Note, however, that a coarse moduli space does not necessarily carry any family of appropriate objects, let alone a universal one.

In other words, a fine moduli space includes both a base space M and universal family U → M, while a coarse moduli space only has the base space M.

=== Moduli stack ===
It is frequently the case that interesting geometric objects come equipped with many natural automorphisms. This in particular makes the existence of a fine moduli space impossible (intuitively, the idea is that if L is some geometric object, the trivial family L × [0,1] can be made into a twisted family on the circle S^{1} by identifying L × {0} with L × {1} via a nontrivial automorphism. Now if a fine moduli space X existed, the map S^{1} → X should not be constant, but would have to be constant on any proper open set by triviality), one can still sometimes obtain a coarse moduli space. However, this approach is not ideal, as such spaces are not guaranteed to exist, they are frequently singular when they do exist, and miss details about some non-trivial families of objects they classify.

A more sophisticated approach is to enrich the classification by remembering the isomorphisms. More precisely, on any base B one can consider the category of families on B with only isomorphisms between families taken as morphisms. One then considers the fibred category which assigns to any space B the groupoid of families over B. The use of these categories fibred in groupoids to describe a moduli problem goes back to Grothendieck (1960/61). In general, they cannot be represented by schemes or even algebraic spaces, but in many cases, they have a natural structure of an algebraic stack.

Algebraic stacks and their use to analyze moduli problems appeared in Deligne-Mumford (1969) as a tool to prove the irreducibility of the (coarse) moduli space of curves of a given genus. The language of algebraic stacks essentially provides a systematic way to view the fibred category that constitutes the moduli problem as a "space", and the moduli stack of many moduli problems is better-behaved (such as smooth) than the corresponding coarse moduli space.

== Further examples ==
=== Moduli of curves ===
The moduli stack $\mathcal{M}_{g}$ classifies families of smooth projective curves of genus g, together with their isomorphisms. When g > 1, this stack may be compactified by adding new "boundary" points which correspond to stable nodal curves (together with their isomorphisms). A curve is stable if it has only a finite group of automorphisms. The resulting stack is denoted $\overline{\mathcal{M}}_{g}$. Both moduli stacks carry universal families of curves. One can also define coarse moduli spaces representing isomorphism classes of smooth or stable curves. These coarse moduli spaces were actually studied before the notion of moduli stack was invented. In fact, the idea of a moduli stack was invented by Deligne and Mumford in an attempt to prove the projectivity of the coarse moduli spaces. In recent years, it has become apparent that the stack of curves is actually the more fundamental object.

Both stacks above have dimension 3g−3; hence a stable nodal curve can be completely specified by choosing the values of 3g−3 parameters, when g > 1. In lower genus, one must account for the presence of smooth families of automorphisms, by subtracting their number. There is exactly one complex curve of genus zero, the Riemann sphere, and its group of isomorphisms is PGL(2). Hence, the dimension of $\mathcal{M}_0$ is

dim(space of genus zero curves) − dim(group of automorphisms) = 0 − dim(PGL(2)) = −3.

Likewise, in genus 1, there is a one-dimensional space of curves, but every such curve has a one-dimensional group of automorphisms. Hence, the stack $\mathcal{M}_1$ has dimension 0. The coarse moduli spaces have dimension 3g−3 as the stacks when g > 1 because the curves with genus g > 1 have only a finite group as its automorphism i.e. dim(a group of automorphisms) = 0. Eventually, in genus zero, the coarse moduli space has dimension zero, and in genus one, it has dimension one.

One can also enrich the problem by considering the moduli stack of genus g nodal curves with n marked points. Such marked curves are said to be stable if the subgroup of curve automorphisms which fix the marked points is finite. The resulting moduli stacks of smooth (or stable) genus g curves with n-marked points are denoted $\mathcal{M}_{g,n}$ (or $\overline{\mathcal{M}}_{g,n}$), and have dimension 3g − 3 + n.

A case of particular interest is the moduli stack $\overline{\mathcal{M}}_{1,1}$ of genus 1 curves with one marked point. This is the stack of elliptic curves, and is the natural home of the much studied modular forms, which are meromorphic sections of bundles on this stack.

=== Moduli of varieties ===
In higher dimensions, moduli of algebraic varieties are more difficult to construct and study. For instance, the higher-dimensional analogue of the moduli space of elliptic curves discussed above is the moduli space of abelian varieties, such as the Siegel modular variety. This is the problem underlying Siegel modular form theory. See also Shimura variety.

Using techniques arising out of the minimal model program, moduli spaces of varieties of general type were constructed by János Kollár and Nicholas Shepherd-Barron, now known as KSB moduli spaces.

It has been known that a well-behaved moduli theory can not be established for all Fano varieties. Led by Chenyang Xu, the construction of moduli spaces of Fano varieties has been achieved by restricting to a special class of K-stable varieties. More precisely, there exists a projective scheme which parametrizes K-polystable Fano varieties, which is the good moduli space of the moduli stack parametrizing K-semistable Fano varieties.

The construction of moduli spaces of Calabi-Yau varieties is an important open problem, and only special cases such as moduli spaces of K3 surfaces or abelian varieties are understood.

=== Moduli of vector bundles ===
Another important moduli problem is to understand the geometry of (various substacks of) the moduli stack Vect_{n}(X) of rank n vector bundles on a fixed algebraic variety X. This stack has been most studied when X is one-dimensional, and especially when n equals one. In this case, the coarse moduli space is the Picard scheme, which like the moduli space of curves, was studied before stacks were invented. When the bundles have rank 1 and degree zero, the study of coarse moduli space is the study of the Jacobian variety.

In applications to physics, the number of moduli of vector bundles and the closely related problem of the number of moduli of principal G-bundles has been found to be significant in gauge theory.

=== Volume of the moduli space ===
Simple geodesics and Weil-Petersson volumes of moduli spaces of bordered Riemann surfaces.

== Methods for constructing moduli spaces ==
The modern formulation of moduli problems and definition of moduli spaces in terms of the moduli functors (or more generally the categories fibred in groupoids), and spaces (almost) representing them, dates back to Grothendieck (1960/61), in which he described the general framework, approaches, and main problems using Teichmüller spaces in complex analytical geometry as an example. The talks, in particular, describe the general method of constructing moduli spaces by first rigidifying the moduli problem under consideration.

More precisely, the existence of non-trivial automorphisms of the objects being classified makes it impossible to have a fine moduli space. However, it is often possible to consider a modified moduli problem of classifying the original objects together with additional data, chosen in such a way that the identity is the only automorphism respecting also the additional data. With a suitable choice of the rigidifying data, the modified moduli problem will have a (fine) moduli space T, often described as a subscheme of a suitable Hilbert scheme or Quot scheme. The rigidifying data is moreover chosen so that it corresponds to a principal bundle with an algebraic structure group G. Thus one can move back from the rigidified problem to the original by taking quotient by the action of G, and the problem of constructing the moduli space becomes that of finding a scheme (or more general space) that is (in a suitably strong sense) the quotient T/G of T by the action of G. The last problem, in general, does not admit a solution; however, it is addressed by the groundbreaking geometric invariant theory (GIT), developed by David Mumford in 1965, which shows that under suitable conditions the quotient indeed exists.

To see how this might work, consider the problem of parametrizing smooth curves of the genus g > 2. A smooth curve together with a complete linear system of degree d > 2g is equivalent to a closed one dimensional subscheme of the projective space P^{d−g}. Consequently, the moduli space of smooth curves and linear systems (satisfying certain criteria) may be embedded in the Hilbert scheme of a sufficiently high-dimensional projective space. This locus H in the Hilbert scheme has an action of PGL(n) which mixes the elements of the linear system; consequently, the moduli space of smooth curves is then recovered as the quotient of H by the projective general linear group.

Another general approach is primarily associated with Michael Artin. Here the idea is to start with an object of the kind to be classified and study its deformation theory. This means first constructing infinitesimal deformations, then appealing to prorepresentability theorems to put these together into an object over a formal base. Next, an appeal to Grothendieck's formal existence theorem provides an object of the desired kind over a base which is a complete local ring. This object can be approximated via Artin's approximation theorem by an object defined over a finitely generated ring. The spectrum of this latter ring can then be viewed as giving a kind of coordinate chart on the desired moduli space. By gluing together enough of these charts, we can cover the space, but the map from our union of spectra to the moduli space will, in general, be many to one. We, therefore, define an equivalence relation on the former; essentially, two points are equivalent if the objects over each are isomorphic. This gives a scheme and an equivalence relation, which is enough to define an algebraic space (actually an algebraic stack if we are being careful) if not always a scheme.

== In physics ==
The term moduli space is sometimes used in physics to refer specifically to the moduli space of vacuum expectation values of a set of scalar fields, or to the moduli space of possible string backgrounds.

Moduli spaces also appear in physics in topological field theory, where one can use Feynman path integrals to compute the intersection numbers of various algebraic moduli spaces.

== See also ==
=== Construction tools ===
- Hilbert scheme
- Quot scheme
- Deformation theory
- GIT quotient
- Artin's criterion, general criterion for constructing moduli spaces as algebraic stacks from moduli functors

=== Moduli spaces ===
- Moduli of algebraic curves
- Moduli stack of elliptic curves
- Moduli spaces of K-stable Fano varieties
- Modular curve
- Picard functor
- Moduli of semistable sheaves on a curve
- Seiberg–Witten moduli space
- Kontsevich moduli space
- Moduli of semistable sheaves
