= Castelnuovo–Mumford regularity =

In algebraic geometry, the Castelnuovo–Mumford regularity of a coherent sheaf F over projective space $\mathbf{P}^n$ is the smallest integer r such that it is r-regular, meaning that

$$H^i(\mathbf{P}^n, F(r-i))=0$$

whenever $i>0$. The regularity of a subscheme is defined to be the regularity of its sheaf of ideals. The regularity controls when the Hilbert function of the sheaf becomes a polynomial; more precisely dim $H^0(\mathbf{P}^n, F(m))$ is a polynomial in m when m is at least the regularity. The concept of r-regularity was introduced by David Mumford (1966, lecture 14), who attributed the following results to Guido Castelnuovo (1893):

- An r-regular sheaf is s-regular for any $s\ge r$.
- If a coherent sheaf is r-regular then $F(r)$ is generated by its global sections.

== Graded modules ==
A related idea exists in commutative algebra. Suppose $R= k[x_0,\dots,x_n]$ is a polynomial ring over a field k and M is a finitely generated graded R-module. Suppose M has a minimal graded free resolution

$$\cdots\rightarrow F_j \rightarrow\cdots\rightarrow F_0\rightarrow M\rightarrow 0$$

and let $b_j$ be the maximum of the degrees of the generators of $F_j$. If r is an integer such that $b_j - j \le r$ for all j, then M is said to be r-regular. The regularity of M is the smallest such r.

These two notions of regularity coincide when F is a coherent sheaf such that $\operatorname{Ass}(F)$ contains no closed points. Then the graded module

$$M=\bigoplus_{d \in \Z} H^0(\mathbf{P}^n,F(d))$$

is finitely generated and has the same regularity as F.

== See also ==
- Hilbert scheme
- Quot scheme
