= Amnon Yekutieli =

Israeli mathematician

- אמנון יקותיאלי
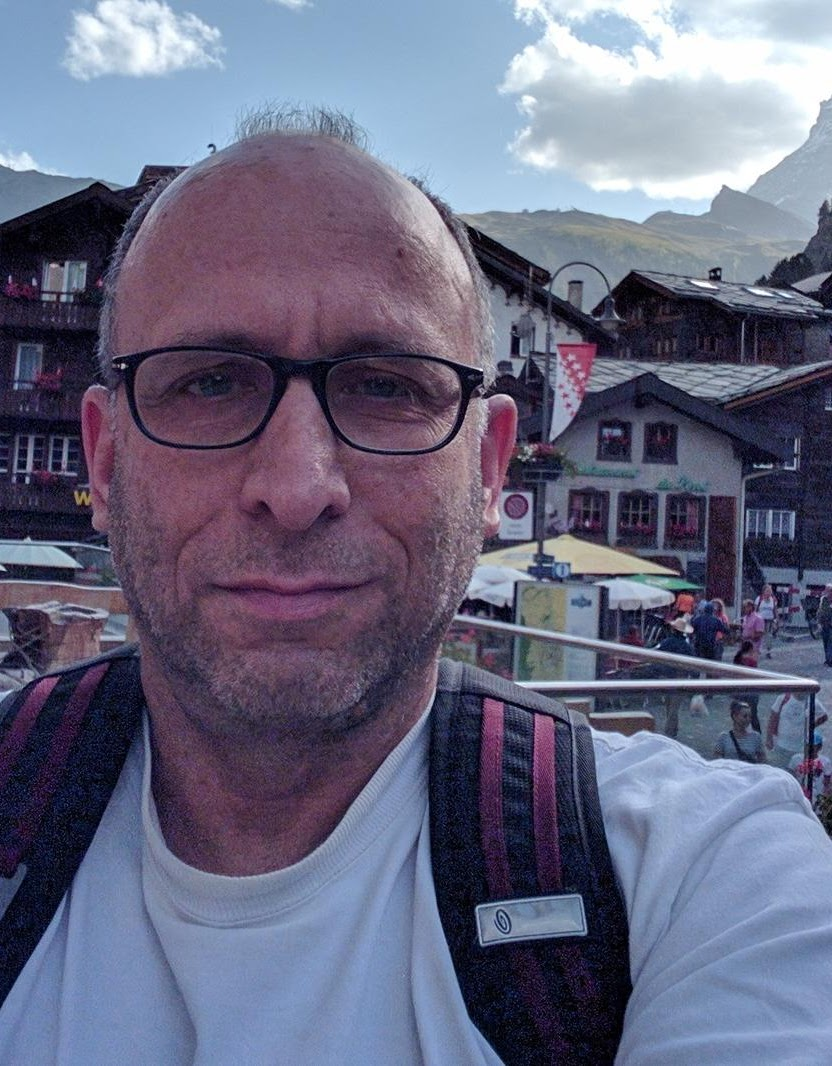
- Born: August 21, 1959 (age 67); Rehovot, Israel
- Education: Massachusetts Institute of Technology
- Scientific career
- Fields: Mathematics
- Workplaces: Ben-Gurion University of the Negev
- Doctoral advisor: Michael Artin

Amnon Yekutieli (Hebrew: אמנון יקותיאלי) is an Israeli mathematician, working in noncommutative algebra, algebraic geometry and deformation quantization. He is a professor of mathematics at the Ben-Gurion University of the Negev.

== Professional career ==
Born in Rehovot, Israel, he earned both his bachelor's and master's degrees at the Hebrew University of Jerusalem. His master thesis was done under the supervision of Shimshon Amitsur. He received his Ph.D. from the Massachusetts Institute of Technology in 1990, after studying there with Michael Artin. Yekutieli received the Alon Fellowship in 1993. He joined the Ben-Gurion University of the Negev in 1999.

== Selected publications ==
- Yekutieli, Amnon (1992). An explicit construction of the Grothendieck residue complex (with an appendix by P. Sastry). Asterisque. Vol. 208. Société Mathématique de France.
- Yekutieli, Amnon (1992). "Dualizing complexes over noncommutative graded algebras". Journal of Algebra. 153 (1): 41–84. doi:10.1016/0021-8693(92)90148-F.
- Yekutieli, Amnon; Zhang, James (1997). "Serre duality for noncommutative projective schemes". Proceedings of the American Mathematical Society. 125 (3): 697–707. doi:10.1090/S0002-9939-97-03782-9.
- Yekutieli, Amnon; Zhang, James J. (1999). "Rings with Auslander dualizing complexes". Journal of Algebra. 213 (1): 1–51. arXiv:math/9804005. doi:10.1006/jabr.1998.7657.
- Yekutieli, Amnon (1999). "Dualizing complexes, Morita equivalence and the derived Picard group of a ring". Journal of the London Mathematical Society. 60 (3): 723–746. arXiv:math/9810134. doi:10.1112/S0024610799008108.
- Miyachi, Jun-ichi; Yekutieli, Amnon (2001). "Derived Picard groups of finite-dimensional hereditary algebras". Compositio Mathematica. 129 (3): 341–368. arXiv:math/9904006. doi:10.1023/A:1012579131516.
- Yekutieli, Amnon (2005). "Deformation quantization in algebraic geometry". Advances in Mathematics. 198 (1): 383–432. arXiv:math/0310399. doi:10.1016/j.aim.2005.06.009.
