= Harvard Centennial Medal =

- Description: Honor presented to Harvard GSAS alumni for contributions to society
- Location: Cambridge, Massachusetts
- Country: United States
- Presented by: Harvard Graduate School of Arts and Sciences

The Harvard Centennial Medal is an honor given by the Harvard Graduate School of Arts and Sciences to recipients of graduate degrees from the School for their "contributions to society."

== History and background ==
The Medal was established in 1989 on the 100th anniversary of the Graduate School's founding. Seven individuals were recognized for their achievements that year, and between two and four graduate degree recipients have been honored every year since then. Nominees are evaluated by university officials and alumni, and the winners are selected by the Harvard Corporation.

== Winners ==
- 2026 Frank Bidart, Anjana Rao, Cristián Samper, Londa Schiebinger.
- 2025 Lorraine Daston, Jim Yong Kim, Russell Lande, Mary Beth Norton.
- 2024 Martin Duberman, Myra Marx Ferree, Joan Argetsinger Steitz, Arthur K. Wheelock Jr.
- 2023 Mina Bissell, Catherine Cesarsky, John Dower, Du Yun, Daniel Goleman, Sanford Greenberg
- 2022 Neil Harris, John Kamm, Vicki Sato, Robert Jeffrey Zimmer
- 2021 Lotte Bailyn, John Hutchinson, Marvin Kalb, Peggy McIntosh
- 2020 Stephen Cook, Albert Fishlow, Margaret Kivelson, Helen Vendler
- 2019 Carroll Bogert, Lael Brainard, Roger Ferguson, Jane Lubchenco, Joseph Nye
- 2018 Beth Adelson, Guido Goldman, Harold Luft, Choon Fong Shih
- 2017 Russell Mittermeier, Sarah Morris, Thomas Pettigrew, Richard Sennett
- 2016 Francis Fukuyama, David Mumford, John O'Malley, Cecilia Rouse
- 2015 Wade Davis, Robert Richardson, Louise Ryan, Gordon Wood
- 2014 Anand Mahindra, J. Louis Newell, Emily Pulitzer
- 2012 Daniel Aaron, Karl Eikenberry, Nancy Hopkins, Robert Keohane
- 2011 Heisuke Hironaka, Jeffrey Alan Hoffman, Richard Wall Lyman, Nell Irvin Painter
- 2010 David Bevington, Stephen Fischer-Galati, Eric Maskin, Martha Nussbaum
- 2009 Svetlana Leontief Alpers, David Brion Davis, Thomas Crombie Schelling, Joseph Taylor
- 2008 Susan Lindquist, Earl Powell III, Frank Shu, Ezra Vogel
- 2007 Frederick P. Brooks Jr., Sarah Blaffer Hrdy, Neil L. Rudenstine, Jeffrey D. Sachs
- 2006 Daniel Callahan, Sandra Faber, Robert Solow, and Kevin Starr
- 2005 Michael Artin, H. Robert Horvitz, Elaine Pagels, and Michael Spence
- 2004 John Adams, Susan Fiske, Richard Hunt, and George Rupp
- 2003 Agnes Gund, Amy Gutmann, Leon Kass, and William Schneider
- 2002 Lewis Branscomb, Madhav Gadgil, Joanne Martin, and Allen Puckett
- 2001 Bernard Bailyn, Carolyn Bynum, Elliott Carter, and Walter Kohn
- 2000 Harold Amos, Stanley Cavell, and Jill Ker Conway
- 1999 Frances Fergusson, Nguyễn Xuân Oánh, Carl Schorske, and Edward Wilson
- 1998 Sissela Bok, I. Bernard Cohen, and Richard Zare
- 1997 Richard Karp, Stuart Rice, Henry Rosovsky, and Ruth Simmons
- 1996 Leon Botstein, Victor Fung, Paul Guyer, and Maxine Kumin
- 1995 Philip Anderson and Zbigniew Brzezinski
- 1994 Hanna H. Gray, Roald Hoffmann, and Rosalind Krauss
- 1993 Renee Fox, Marilyn French, and Rolf Landauer
- 1992 Edward Bernstein, Stanley Kunitz, Alice Rivlin, and Saul Cohen
- 1991 Eleanor Lansing Dulles, Caryl Haskins, Wesley Posvar, and Susan Sontag
- 1990 Margaret Atwood, Samuel H. Beer, and Leo Kadanoff
- 1989 Thomas Eisner, Jesse Greenstein, Robert Motherwell, David Woodley Packard, Reginald Phelps, James Tobin, and Margaret Wilson

== See also ==
- Harvard Graduate School of Arts and Sciences
