= Hironaka's example =

Counterexample in algebraic geometry

In algebraic geometry, Hironaka's example is a non-Kähler complex manifold that is a deformation of Kähler manifolds found by Heisuke Hironaka (1960, 1962). Hironaka's example can be used to show that several other plausible statements holding for smooth varieties of dimension at most 2 fail for smooth varieties of dimension at least 3.

== Hironaka's example ==
Take two smooth curves C and D in a smooth projective 3-fold P, intersecting in two points c and d that are nodes for the reducible curve $C\cup D$. For some applications these should be chosen so that there is a fixed-point-free automorphism exchanging the curves C and D and also exchanging the points c and d. Hironaka's example V is obtained by gluing two quasi-projective varieties $V_1$ and $V_2$. Let $V_1$ be the variety obtained by blowing up $P \setminus c$ along $C$ and then along the strict transform of $D$, and let $V_2$ be the variety obtained by blowing up $P\setminus d$ along D and then along the strict transform of C. Since these are isomorphic over $P\setminus\{c,d\}$, they can be glued, which results in a proper variety V. Then V has two smooth rational curves L and M lying over c and d such that $L+M$ is algebraically equivalent to 0, so V cannot be projective.

For an explicit example of this configuration, take t to be a point of order 2 in an elliptic curve E, take P to be $E\times E/(t)\times E/(t)$, take C and D to be the sets of points of the form $(x,x,0)$ and $(x,0,x)$, so that c and d are the points (0,0,0) and $(t,0,0)$, and take the involution σ to be the one taking $(x,y,z)$ to $(x+t,z,y)$.

=== A complete abstract variety that is not projective ===
Hironaka's variety is a smooth 3-dimensional complete variety but is not projective as it has a non-trivial curve algebraically equivalent to 0. Any 2-dimensional smooth complete variety is projective, so 3 is the smallest possible dimension for such an example. There are plenty of 2-dimensional complex manifolds that are not algebraic, such as Hopf surfaces (non Kähler) and non-algebraic tori (Kähler).

=== An effective cycle algebraically equivalent to 0 ===
In a projective variety, a nonzero effective cycle has non-zero degree so cannot be algebraically equivalent to 0. In Hironaka's example the effective cycle consisting of the two exceptional curves is algebraically equivalent to 0.

=== A deformation of Kähler manifolds that is not a Kähler manifold ===
If one of the curves D in Hironaka's construction is allowed to vary in a family such that most curves of the family do not intersect D, then one obtains a family of manifolds such that most are projective but one is not. Over the complex numbers this gives a deformation of smooth Kähler (in fact projective) varieties that is not Kähler. This family is trivial in the smooth category, so in particular there are Kähler and non-Kähler smooth compact 3-dimensional complex manifolds that are diffeomorphic.

=== A smooth algebraic space that is not a scheme ===
Choose C and D so that P has an automorphism σ of order 2 acting freely on P and exchanging C and D, and also exchanging c and d. Then the quotient of V by the action of σ is a smooth 3-dimensional algebraic space with an irreducible curve algebraically equivalent to 0. This means that the quotient is a smooth 3-dimensional algebraic space that is not a scheme.

=== A Moishezon manifold that is not an abstract variety ===
If the previous construction is done with complex manifolds rather than algebraic spaces, it gives an example of a smooth 3-dimensional compact Moishezon manifold that is not an abstract variety. A Moishezon manifold of dimension at most 2 is necessarily projective, so 3 is the minimum possible dimension for this example.

=== The quotient of a scheme by a free action of a finite group need not be a scheme ===
This is essentially the same as the previous two examples. The quotient does exist as a scheme if every orbit is contained in an affine open subscheme; the counterexample above shows that this technical condition cannot be dropped.

=== A finite subset of a variety need not be contained in an open affine subvariety ===
For quasi-projective varieties, it is obvious that any finite subset is contained in an open affine subvariety. This property fails for Hironaka's example: a two-points set consisting of a point in each of the exceptional curves is not contained in any open affine subvariety.

=== A variety with no Hilbert scheme ===
For Hironaka's variety V over the complex numbers with an automorphism of order 2 as above, the Hilbert functor Hilb_{V/C} of closed subschemes is not representable by a scheme, essentially because the quotient by the group of order 2 does not exist as a scheme (Nitsure 2005, p.112). In other words, this gives an example of a smooth complete variety whose Hilbert scheme does not exist. Grothendieck showed that the Hilbert scheme always exists for projective varieties.

=== Descent can fail for proper smooth morphisms of proper schemes ===
Pick a non-trivial Z/2Z torsor B → A; for example in characteristic not 2 one could take A and B to be the affine line minus the origin with the map from B to A given by x → x^{2}. Think of B as an open covering of U for the étale topology. If V is a complete scheme with a fixed point free action of a group of order 2, then descent data for the map V × B → B are given by a suitable isomorphism from V×C to itself, where C = B×_{A}B = B × Z/2Z. Such an isomorphism is given by the action of Z/2Z on V and C. If this descent datum were effective then the fibers of the descent over U would give a quotient of V by the action of Z/2Z. So if this quotient does not exist as a scheme (as in the example above) then the descent data are ineffective. See Vistoli (2005, page 103).

=== A scheme of finite type over a field such that not every line bundle comes from a divisor ===
If X is a scheme of finite type over a field there is a natural map from divisors to line bundles. If X is either projective or reduced then this map is surjective. Kleiman found an example of a non-reduced and non-projective X for which this map is not surjective as follows. Take Hironaka's example of a variety with two rational curves A and B such that A+B is numerically equivalent to 0. Then X is given by picking points a and b on A and B and introducing nilpotent elements at these points.
