= Matsusaka's big theorem =

Theorem in algebraic geometry

In algebraic geometry, given an ample line bundle L on a compact complex manifold X, Matsusaka's big theorem gives an integer m, depending only on the Hilbert polynomial of L, such that the tensor power L^{n} is very ample for n ≥ m.

The theorem was proved by Teruhisa Matsusaka in 1972 and named by Lieberman and Mumford in 1975.

The theorem has an application to the theory of Hilbert schemes.
