= Sanford Greenberg =

American inventor

- Born: Sanford David Greenberg; December 13, 1940 (age 85); Buffalo, New York, U.S.
- Education: Columbia University (BA, MBA); Harvard University (MA, PhD); Linacre College, Oxford
- Occupation: Chairman of the Board of Governors of Johns Hopkins School of Medicine's Wilmer Eye Institute
- Spouse: Susan Roseno (m. 1962)

Sanford "Sandy" David Greenberg (born December 13, 1940) is an American inventor, author, public servant, and philanthropist best known for his efforts toward the goal of ending blindness.

== Early life ==
Greenberg was born in Buffalo, New York, as the oldest of four children. His father, Albert, was a tailor who died of a heart attack in 1946. Greenberg attended Bennett High School, then entered Columbia University in 1958 on a full scholarship where he roomed with Art Garfunkel and Jerry Speyer, and was a friend of Michael Mukasey.

As Greenberg recounts in his memoir, misdiagnosed glaucoma caused his eyesight to fail during the first semester of his junior year in college, and then in January 1961, his vision failed completely. The next month, a surgeon blinded Greenberg to save his eyes. With Art Garfunkel's encouragement and help, Greenberg returned to Columbia in September 1961, made up the semester he had lost, and graduated with his class as its president and Phi Beta Kappa.

In 1965, Greenberg received a master's degree and a PhD in government from Harvard University, where he was a Woodrow Wilson Fellow, and attended Harvard Law School. He spent 1964–1965 at University of Oxford, Linacre College as one of 24 Marshall Scholars named that year, and then received an MBA from Columbia Business School in 1966, while also serving as an assistant professor in its department of public law and government.

== Career ==
Greenberg launched his first company, International Communications Associates, in the field of information technology of information processing. In 1966, Greenberg developed and got patents on an electronic device for compressed speech, which speeds up the reproduction of words from recordings without distorting any sound. In 1966 Greenberg was named one of the ten "Outstanding Young Men" of America by the United States Junior Chamber. That spring, Greenberg was also one of seventeen young Americans selected to be White House Fellows in the Lyndon Johnson administration. While serving as a Fellow, Greenberg formed a close friendship with David Rockefeller, who had helped found the Program and became Greenberg's mentor.

In 1968, with $2 million raised from Wall Street financial institutions, Greenberg launched EDP (Electronic Data Processing), a systems-analysis company headquartered in Washington, DC. During these years, Greenberg was still perfecting the speech-compression machine he had been working on for almost a decade. The final design, patented in 1969, was one of the earliest methods for time-scale modification of speech. Greenberg licensed the device to Sony, General Electric, Matsushita, and other manufacturers of audio equipment. As a member of the board of governors of Ford's Theatre, Greenberg played a role in the renovation and 1968 reopening of the site of Abraham Lincoln's assassination. The following year Harper & Row published Greenberg's analysis of Executive Branch decision-making, The Presidential Advisory System, co-edited with Thomas E. Cronin.

In May 1974, the Young Presidents' Organization named Greenberg its first Man of the Year while he was serving on the board of Ben-Gurion University of the Negev and as a director of the Capital Centre (Landover, Maryland), and as a partner of the Washington Capitals. Greenberg added a second sports venue to his real-estate interests in 1976 when he purchased the Richfield Coliseum, home of the Cleveland Cavaliers. In 1983, Greenberg founded T.E.I. Industries.

As a past director of the National Committee on U.S.-China Relations and a longstanding member of the Council on Foreign Relations, Greenberg was a founding director of the "American Agenda: A Report to the Forty-First President of the United States," George H. W. Bush, chaired by Presidents Carter and Ford. In 1994, Bill Clinton appointed Greenberg to the National Science Board, and in 1996, he became chairman of the federal Rural Healthcare Corporation created by Congress.

== Greenberg Prize ==
In 2012, he announced the Greenberg Prize, a three-million-dollar prize to go to the scientists who contributed the most toward the cause of ending blindness. This gained wide recognition in 2014 when it was granted a featured session on the agenda of the World Economic Forum in Davos, Switzerland. In 2020, the Greenberg Prize was awarded to 13 scientists and researchers.

== American Academy of Arts and Sciences ==
In 2016, Greenberg was inducted into the American Academy of Arts and Sciences. In 2020, Greenberg released his memoir Hello Darkness, My Old Friend published by Post Hill Press, distributed by Simon & Schuster. Justice Ruth Bader Ginsburg contributed a warm foreword to the memoir. Hello Darkness, My Old Friend also includes an introduction from Art Garfunkel and a "Final Word" from novelist Margaret Atwood. The audiobook version of the book is also read by Art Garfunkel. In 2023, Greenberg was awarded the 2023 Harvard Centennial Medal of the Harvard Graduate School of Arts and Sciences.

== Personal life ==
Greenberg married Susan Roseno in August 1962 in Buffalo. Art Garfunkel is the godfather of their three children.

Greenberg has been notable for his refusal to avail himself of the most common aids for the blind, such as a companion dog, a cane, or the use of Braille. Greenberg also plays basketball. He has written that although he cannot see, he can feel people moving in waves around him and orient himself toward the basket. For more than 50 years, Greenberg has also been collecting art that he cannot see, including pieces by Frank Stella, Picasso, and Rembrandt.
