= Bill Schneider (journalist) =

American journalist (born 1944)

William Schneider
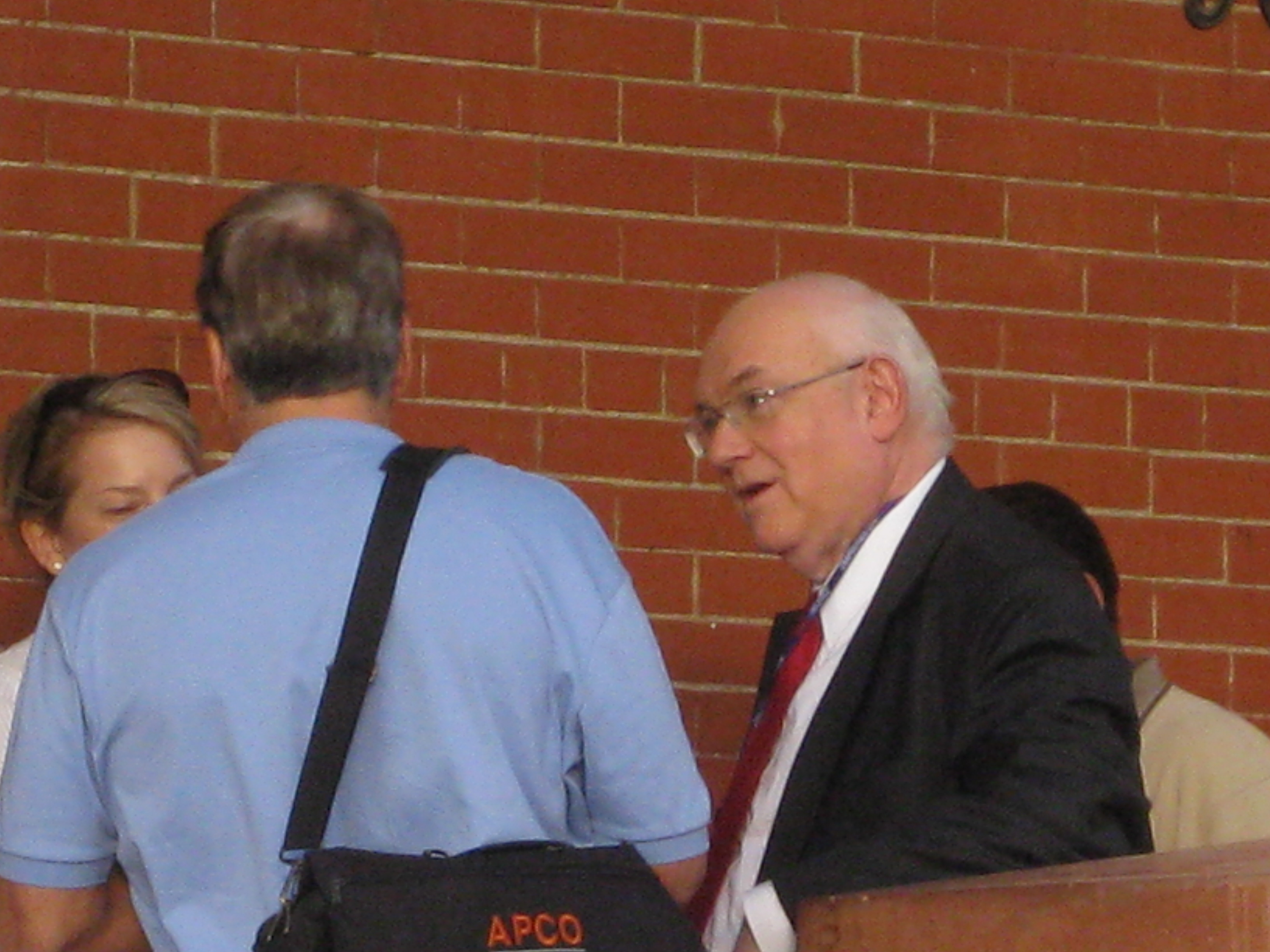
- Schneider (right) in 2008.
- Born: October 8, 1944 (age 81); Portsmouth, Virginia, United States
- Occupations: Broadcast journalist, professor
- Awards: Julian P. Kanter Award for Excellence in Television (2001); Harvard Centennial Medal (2003)

William Schneider (born October 8, 1944) is an American journalist. From 1990 to 2009, he served as CNN's senior political analyst. He is a Distinguished Senior Fellow & Resident Scholar at Third Way, a Washington think tank.

Schneider is also serving as the Omer L. and Nancy Hirst Professor at George Mason University's School of Public Policy, and teaching at George Mason University Schar School of Policy and Government. He has also been a contributing editor to the Opinion section of the Los Angeles Times.

== Awards ==
In 2003, he was awarded the Centennial Medal for contributions to society by the Graduate School of Arts and Sciences at Harvard University. In 2001, he received the Julian P. Kanter Award for Excellence in Television from the American Association of Political Consultants. He is also the recipient of the Brandeis University Pride Award and the Alumni Achievement Award.

In 2009, the International Foundation for Electoral Systems presented Schneider with a special award "for his extensive coverage and keen insight of the 2008 United States presidential elections . . . showcasing democracy in action" to the world.
