= Smooth algebra =

In algebra, a commutative k-algebra A is said to be 0-smooth if it satisfies the following lifting property: given a k-algebra C, an ideal N of C whose square is zero and a k-algebra map $u: A \to C/N$, there exists a k-algebra map $v: A \to C$ such that u is v followed by the canonical map. If there exists at most one such lifting v, then A is said to be 0-unramified (or 0-neat). A is said to be 0-étale if it is 0-smooth and 0-unramified. The notion of 0-smoothness is also called formal smoothness.

A finitely generated k-algebra A is 0-smooth over k if and only if Spec A is a smooth scheme over k.

A separable algebraic field extension L of k is 0-étale over k. The formal power series ring $k[\![t_1, \ldots, t_n]\!]$ is 0-smooth only when $\operatorname{char}k = p > 0$ and $[k: k^p] < \infty$ (i.e., k has a finite p-basis.)

== I-smooth ==
Let B be an A-algebra and suppose B is given the I-adic topology, I an ideal of B. We say B is I-smooth over A if it satisfies the lifting property: given an A-algebra C, an ideal N of C whose square is zero and an A-algebra map $u: B \to C/N$ that is continuous when $C/N$ is given the discrete topology, there exists an A-algebra map $v: B \to C$ such that u is v followed by the canonical map. As before, if there exists at most one such lift v, then B is said to be I-unramified over A (or I-neat). B is said to be I-étale if it is I-smooth and I-unramified. If I is the zero ideal and A is a field, these notions coincide with 0-smooth etc. as defined above.

A standard example is this: let A be a ring, $B = A[\![t_1, \ldots, t_n]\!]$ and $I = (t_1, \ldots, t_n).$ Then B is I-smooth over A.

Let A be a noetherian local k-algebra with maximal ideal $\mathfrak{m}$. Then A is $\mathfrak{m}$-smooth over $k$ if and only if $A \otimes_k k'$ is a regular ring for any finite extension field $k'$ of $k$.

== See also ==
- étale morphism
- formally smooth morphism
- Popescu's theorem
