= Boris Moishezon =

Soviet mathematician (1937–1993)

Boris Gershevich Moishezon (Russian: Борис Гершевич Мойшезон) (October 26, 1937 – August 25, 1993) was a Soviet mathematician. He left the Soviet Union in 1972 for Tel Aviv, and in 1977 moved to Columbia University, where he was a professor of mathematics until his death sixteen years later. He was a Guggenheim Fellow in 1983.

A resident of Leonia, New Jersey, Moishezon died at Holy Name Hospital in Teaneck, New Jersey on August 25, 1993, due to a heart attack he suffered while jogging.

== Selected publications ==
=== Books ===
- Complex surfaces and connected sums of complex projective planes. Lecture Notes in Mathematics. Vol. 603. Springer Verlag. 1977.

=== Articles ===
- Mandelbaum, Richard; Moishezon, Boris (1976). "On the topological structure of simply-connected algebraic surfaces" (PDF). Bulletin of the American Mathematical Society. 82 (5): 731–733. doi:10.1090/s0002-9904-1976-14136-5. MR 0413135.
- Moishezon, Boris (1977). "Some estimates in the topology of simply-connected algebraic surfaces" (PDF). Bulletin of the American Mathematical Society. 83 (4): 741–744. doi:10.1090/s0002-9904-1977-14376-0. MR 0440567.
- with Richard Mandelbaum: Mandelbaum, Richard; Moishezon, Boris (1980). "On the topology of simply-connected algebraic surfaces". Transactions of the American Mathematical Society. 260: 195–222. doi:10.1090/s0002-9947-1980-0570786-6. MR 0570786.
- Moishezon, Boris; Teicher, Mina (1986). "Existence of simply connected algebraic surfaces of general type with positive and zero indices". Proceedings of the National Academy of Sciences of the United States of America. 83 (18): 6665–6666. Bibcode:1986PNAS...83.6665M. doi:10.1073/pnas.83.18.6665. PMC 386569. PMID 16593754.
- Friedman, Robert; Moishezon, Boris; Morgan, John W. (1987). "On the C^{∞} invariance of the canonical classes of certain algebraic surfaces". Bulletin of the American Mathematical Society. New Series. 17: 283–286. doi:10.1090/s0273-0979-1987-15561-3. MR 0903733.

== See also ==
- Moishezon manifold
- Nakai–Moishezon criterion

== Sources ==
- "Boris Moishezon, Mathematician, 55". The Columbia University Record. 19 (1). September 3, 1995.
- Bukhshtaber, Viktor M.; Novikov, Sergei P. (1995). "Boris Gershevich Moishezon (obituary)". Russian Mathematical Surveys. 50 (3): 613–614. Bibcode:1995RuMaS..50..613B. doi:10.1070/RM1995v050n03ABEH002565. MR 1349322. S2CID 250906784.
