= Moishezon manifold =

Compact complex manifold in algebraic geometry

In mathematics, a Moishezon manifold M is a compact complex manifold such that the field of meromorphic functions on each component M has transcendence degree equal to the complex dimension of the component:

$$\dim_\mathbf{C}M=a(M)=\operatorname{tr.deg.}_\mathbf{C}\mathbf{C}(M).$$

Complex algebraic varieties have this property, but the converse is not true: Hironaka's example gives a smooth 3-dimensional Moishezon manifold that is not an algebraic variety or scheme. Moishezon (1967, Chapter I, Theorem 11) showed that a Moishezon manifold is a projective algebraic variety if and only if it admits a Kähler metric. Artin (1970) showed that any Moishezon manifold carries an algebraic space structure; more precisely, the category of Moishezon spaces (similar to Moishezon manifolds, but are allowed to have singularities) is equivalent with the category of algebraic spaces that are proper over Spec(C).
