= Popescu's theorem =

In commutative algebra and algebraic geometry, Popescu's theorem, introduced by Dorin Popescu, states:

Let A be a Noetherian ring and B a Noetherian algebra over it. Then, the structure map A → B is a regular homomorphism if and only if B is a direct limit of smooth A-algebras.

For example, if A is a local G-ring (e.g., a local excellent ring) and B its completion, then the map A → B is regular by definition and the theorem applies.

Another proof of Popescu's theorem was given by Tetsushi Ogoma, while an exposition of the result was provided by Richard Swan.

The usual proof of the Artin approximation theorem relies crucially on Popescu's theorem. Popescu's result was proved by an alternate method, and somewhat strengthened, by Mark Spivakovsky.

== See also ==
- Ring with the approximation property
