= Harold Amos =

American microbiologist

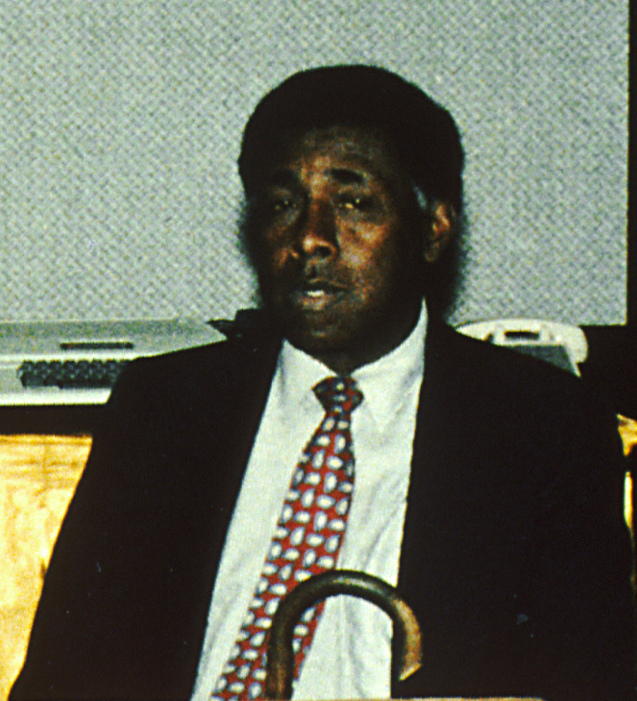
- Born: September 7, 1918; Pennsauken, New Jersey, U.S.
- Died: February 26, 2003 (aged 84); Boston, Massachusetts, U.S.
- Education: Springfield College; Harvard Medical School
- Scientific career
- Fields: Microbiology
- Workplaces: Harvard Medical School
- Thesis: (1952)
- Doctoral advisor: Howard J. Mueller

Harold Amos (September 7, 1918 – February 26, 2003) was an American microbiologist. He taught at Harvard Medical School for nearly fifty years and was the first African American department chair of the school.

== Early life ==
Amos was born in Pennsauken Township, New Jersey, to Howard R. Amos Sr., a Philadelphia postman, and Iola Johnson. He was the second of nine children. Iola Johnson was adopted and educated by a Philadelphia Quaker family. Due to the close relationship between Iola and the Quaker family, the Amos family received many books, including a biography of Louis Pasteur. Excelling as a student, Amos graduated in 1936 at the top of his class from Camden High School in New Jersey. He attended Springfield College in Massachusetts on a full academic scholarship. In 1941 he graduated summa cum laude with a degree in biology. He was drafted the following year, and after returning home from World War II in 1946, Amos began his graduate studies at Harvard University. He was the first African American to earn a doctoral degree from the Division of Medical Sciences, Harvard Medical School, in 1952.

== Military service ==
Amos was drafted into the US Army in 1942, serving in the Quartermaster's Corps in World War II as a warrant officer. He started out his military service in England before being sent to France six days following the battle of Normandy. There, he traveled along the coast of France where he eventually started speaking very fluently in the language while becoming an expert on the local food and wine. He was discharged in February 1946, after which he started his career in microbiology.

== Career ==
In September 1947, Springfield College hired him as a biology professor. Amos was the college’s first African American faculty member. Amos was awarded a M.A. in 1947 and a Ph.D. in 1952 from Harvard Medical School. He was a graduate student with Howard J. Mueller. Harold's thesis was on the infectivity of the Herpes virus. After graduating, he was awarded a Fulbright scholarship that took him to the Pasteur Institute for two years. Amos joined the Harvard Medical School faculty in 1954, working as a teacher. He was the chairman of the bacteriology department from 1968 to 1971 and again from 1975 to 1978. In 1975, he was named the Maude and Lillian Presley professor of microbiology and molecular genetics. He was a presidential advisor to Richard Nixon, a Fellow of the American Academy of Arts and Sciences (1974), the Institute of Medicine, and the American Association for the Advancement of Science. In 1988 Amos received professor emeritus status. Amos was awarded the National Academy of Sciences' Public Welfare Medal in 1995 and the Harvard Centennial Medal in 2000. He directed the Minority Medical Faculty Development Program (MMFDP) of the Robert Wood Johnson Foundation after his retirement from Harvard. A diversity award at Harvard Medical School is named after Amos. He inspired hundreds of minorities to become medical doctors. He was well known as an inviting and welcoming mentor to both students and junior faculty members.

== Awards ==
- Howard University’s Dr. Charles R. Drew World Medical Prize in 1989
- National Academy of Sciences' Public Welfare Medal in 1995
- Harvard Centennial Medal in 2000
- Fellow of the American Academy of Arts and Sciences
- Fellow of the American Association for the Advancement of Science

== Publications ==
Harold Amos research was mostly recognized for his work about bacterial metabolism, nutrition, animal cell culture, virology, and the effects of hormones. During his time at Harvard University he began working on a thesis on herpes simplex virus that utilized chickens' chorioallantoic membrane, which led to his Fulbright Fellowship. That fellowship supported his work on mutation of E. coli and his research on using cells in culture to understand how molecule entry is regulated in cells. Amos published over seventy scientific papers.
