= Hilbert series and Hilbert polynomial =

Tool in mathematical dimension theory

In commutative algebra, the Hilbert function, the Hilbert polynomial, and the Hilbert series of a graded commutative algebra finitely generated over a field are three strongly related notions which measure the growth of the dimension of the homogeneous components of the algebra.

These notions have been extended to filtered algebras, and graded or filtered modules over these algebras, as well as to coherent sheaves over projective schemes.

The typical situations where these notions are used are the following:

- The quotient by a homogeneous ideal of a multivariate polynomial ring, graded by the total degree.
- The quotient by an ideal of a multivariate polynomial ring, filtered by the total degree.
- The filtration of a local ring by the powers of its maximal ideal. In this case the Hilbert polynomial is called the Hilbert–Samuel polynomial.

The Hilbert series of an algebra or a module is a special case of the Hilbert–Poincaré series of a graded vector space.

The Hilbert polynomial and Hilbert series are important in computational algebraic geometry, as they are the easiest known way for computing the dimension and the degree of an algebraic variety defined by explicit polynomial equations. In addition, they provide useful invariants for families of algebraic varieties because a flat family $\pi:X \to S$ has the same Hilbert polynomial over any closed point $s \in S$. This is used in the construction of the Hilbert scheme and Quot scheme.

== Definitions and main properties ==
Consider a graded commutative algebra S over a field K, which is finitely generated by elements of positive degree. This means that

$$S = \bigoplus_{i \ge 0} S_i$$

and that $S_0=K$.

The Hilbert function

$$HF_S : n\longmapsto \dim_K S_n$$

maps the integer n to the dimension of the K-vector space S_{n}. The Hilbert series, which is called Hilbert–Poincaré series in the more general setting of graded vector spaces, is the formal series

$$HS_S(t)=\sum_{n=0}^{\infty} HF_S(n)t^n.$$

If S is generated by h homogeneous elements of positive degrees $d_1, \ldots, d_h$, then the sum of the Hilbert series is a rational fraction

$$HS_S(t)=\frac{Q(t)}{\prod_{i=1}^h \left (1-t^{d_i} \right )},$$

where Q is a polynomial with integer coefficients.

If S is generated by elements of degree 1 then the sum of the Hilbert series may be rewritten as

$$HS_S(t)=\frac{P(t)}{(1-t)^\delta},$$

where P is a polynomial with integer coefficients, and $\delta$ is the Krull dimension of S.

In this case the series expansion of this rational fraction is

$$HS_S(t)=P(t) \left(1+\delta t+\cdots +\binom{n+\delta-1}{\delta-1} t^n+\cdots\right)$$

where

$$\binom{n+\delta-1}{\delta-1} = \frac{(n+\delta-1)(n+\delta-2)\cdots (n+1)}{(\delta-1)!}$$

is the binomial coefficient for $n>-\delta,$ and is 0 otherwise.

If

$$P(t)=\sum_{i=0}^d a_it^i,$$

the coefficient of $t^n$ in $HS_S(t)$ is thus

$$HF_S(n)= \sum_{i=0}^d a_i \binom{n -i+\delta-1}{\delta-1}.$$

For $n\ge i-\delta+1,$ the term of index i in this sum is a polynomial in n of degree $\delta-1$ with leading coefficient $a_i/(\delta-1)!.$ This shows that there exists a unique polynomial $HP_S(n)$ with rational coefficients which is equal to $HF_S(n)$ for n large enough. This polynomial is the Hilbert polynomial, and has the form

$$HP_S(n)= \frac{P(1)}{(\delta-1)!}n^{\delta-1} + \text{ terms of lower degree in } n.$$

The least n_{0} such that $HP_S(n)=HF_S(n)$ for n ≥ n_{0} is called the Hilbert regularity. It may be lower than $\deg P-\delta+1$.

The Hilbert polynomial is a numerical polynomial, since the dimensions are integers, but the polynomial almost never has integer coefficients (Schenck 2003, pp. 41).

All these definitions may be extended to finitely generated graded modules over S, with the only difference that a factor t^{m} appears in the Hilbert series, where m is the minimal degree of the generators of the module, which may be negative.

The Hilbert function, the Hilbert series and the Hilbert polynomial of a filtered algebra are those of the associated graded algebra.

The Hilbert polynomial of a projective variety V in P^{n} is defined as the Hilbert polynomial of the homogeneous coordinate ring of V.

== Graded algebra and polynomial rings ==
Polynomial rings and their quotients by homogeneous ideals are typical graded algebras. Conversely, if S is a graded algebra generated over the field K by n homogeneous elements g_{1}, ..., g_{n} of degree 1, then the map which sends X_{i} onto g_{i} defines an homomorphism of graded rings from $R_n=K[X_1,\ldots, X_n]$ onto S. Its kernel is a homogeneous ideal I and this defines an isomorphism of graded algebra between $R_n/I$ and S.

Thus, the graded algebras generated by elements of degree 1 are exactly, up to an isomorphism, the quotients of polynomial rings by homogeneous ideals. Therefore, the remainder of this article will be restricted to the quotients of polynomial rings by ideals.

== Properties of Hilbert series ==
=== Additivity ===
Hilbert series and Hilbert polynomial are additive relatively to exact sequences. More precisely, if

$$0 \;\rightarrow\; A\;\rightarrow\; B\;\rightarrow\; C \;\rightarrow\; 0$$

is a short exact sequence of graded or filtered modules, then we have

$$HS_B=HS_A+HS_C$$

and

$$HP_B=HP_A+HP_C.$$

This follows immediately from the same property for the dimension of vector spaces.

=== Quotient by a non-zero divisor ===
Let A be a graded algebra and f a homogeneous element of degree d in A which is not a zero divisor. Then we have

$$HS_{A/(f)}(t)=(1-t^d)\,HS_A(t)\,.$$

It follows from the additivity on the exact sequence

$$0 \;\rightarrow\; A^{[d]}\; \xrightarrow{f}\; A \;\rightarrow\; A/f\rightarrow\; 0\,,$$

where the arrow labeled f is the multiplication by f, and $A^{[d]}$ is the graded module which is obtained from A by shifting the degrees by d, in order that the multiplication by f has degree 0. This implies that $HS_{A^{[d]}}(t)=t^d\,HS_A(t)\,.$

=== Hilbert series and Hilbert polynomial of a polynomial ring ===
The Hilbert series of the polynomial ring $R_n=K[x_1, \ldots, x_n]$ in $n$ indeterminates is

$$HS_{R_n}(t) = \frac{1}{(1-t)^{n}}\,.$$

It follows that the Hilbert polynomial is

$$HP_{R_n}(k) = {{k+n-1}\choose{n-1}} = \frac{(k+1)\cdots(k+n-1)}{(n-1)!}\,.$$

The proof that the Hilbert series has this simple form is obtained by applying recursively the previous formula for the quotient by a non zero divisor (here $x_n$) and remarking that $HS_K(t)=1\,.$

=== Shape of the Hilbert series and dimension ===
A graded algebra A generated by homogeneous elements of degree 1 has Krull dimension zero if the maximal homogeneous ideal, that is the ideal generated by the homogeneous elements of degree 1, is nilpotent. This implies that the dimension of A as a K-vector space is finite and the Hilbert series of A is a polynomial P(t) such that P(1) is equal to the dimension of A as a K-vector space.

If the Krull dimension of A is positive, there is a homogeneous element f of degree one which is not a zero divisor (in fact almost all elements of degree one have this property). The Krull dimension of A/(f) is the Krull dimension of A minus one.

The additivity of Hilbert series shows that $HS_{A/(f)}(t)=(1-t)\,HS_A(t)$. Iterating this a number of times equal to the Krull dimension of A, we get eventually an algebra of dimension 0 whose Hilbert series is a polynomial P(t). This show that the Hilbert series of A is

$$HS_A(t)=\frac{P(t)}{(1-t)^d}$$

where the polynomial P(t) is such that P(1) ≠ 0 and d is the Krull dimension of A.

This formula for the Hilbert series implies that the degree of the Hilbert polynomial is d, and that its leading coefficient is $\frac{P(1)}{d!}$.

== Degree of a projective variety and Bézout's theorem ==
The Hilbert series allows us to compute the degree of an algebraic variety as the value at 1 of the numerator of the Hilbert series. This provides also a rather simple proof of Bézout's theorem.

For showing the relationship between the degree of a projective algebraic set and the Hilbert series, consider a projective algebraic set V, defined as the set of the zeros of a homogeneous ideal $I\subset k[x_0, x_1, \ldots, x_n]$, where k is a field, and let $R=k[x_0, \ldots, x_n]/I$ be the ring of the regular functions on the algebraic set.

In this section, one does not need irreducibility of algebraic sets nor primality of ideals. Also, as Hilbert series are not changed by extending the field of coefficients, the field k is supposed, without loss of generality, to be algebraically closed.

The dimension d of V is equal to the Krull dimension minus one of R, and the degree of V is the number of points of intersection, counted with multiplicities, of V with the intersection of $d$ hyperplanes in general position. This implies the existence, in R, of a regular sequence $h_0, \ldots, h_{d}$ of d + 1 homogeneous polynomials of degree one. The definition of a regular sequence implies the existence of exact sequences

$$0 \longrightarrow \left(R/\langle h_0,\ldots, h_{k-1}\rangle \right)^{[1]} \stackrel{h_k}{\longrightarrow} R/\langle h_1,\ldots, h_{k-1}\rangle \longrightarrow R/\langle h_1,\ldots, h_k \rangle \longrightarrow 0,$$

for $k=0, \ldots, d.$ This implies that

$$HS_{R/\langle h_0, \ldots, h_{d-1}\rangle}(t) = (1-t)^d\,HS_R(t)=\frac{P(t)}{1-t},$$

where $P(t)$ is the numerator of the Hilbert series of R.

The ring $R_1=R/\langle h_0, \ldots, h_{d-1}\rangle$ has Krull dimension one, and is the ring of regular functions of a projective algebraic set $V_0$ of dimension 0 consisting of a finite number of points, which may be multiple points. As $h_d$ belongs to a regular sequence, none of these points belong to the hyperplane of equation $h_d=0.$ The complement of this hyperplane is an affine space that contains $V_0.$ This makes $V_0$ an affine algebraic set, which has $R_0 = R_1/\langle h_d-1\rangle$ as its ring of regular functions. The linear polynomial $h_d-1$ is not a zero divisor in $R_1,$ and one has thus an exact sequence

$$0 \longrightarrow R_1 \stackrel{h_d-1}{\longrightarrow} R_1 \longrightarrow R_0 \longrightarrow 0,$$

which implies that

$$HS_{R_0}(t) = (1-t)HS_{R_1}(t) = P(t).$$

Here we are using Hilbert series of filtered algebras, and the fact that the Hilbert series of a graded algebra is also its Hilbert series as filtered algebra.

Thus $R_0$ is an Artinian ring, which is a k-vector space of dimension P(1), and Jordan–Hölder theorem may be used for proving that P(1) is the degree of the algebraic set V. In fact, the multiplicity of a point is the number of occurrences of the corresponding maximal ideal in a composition series.

For proving Bézout's theorem, one may proceed similarly. If $f$ is a homogeneous polynomial of degree $\delta$, which is not a zero divisor in R, the exact sequence

$$0 \longrightarrow R^{[\delta]} \stackrel{f}{\longrightarrow} R \longrightarrow R/\langle f\rangle \longrightarrow 0,$$

shows that

$$HS_{R/\langle f \rangle}(t)= \left (1-t^\delta \right )HS_R(t).$$

Looking on the numerators this proves the following generalization of Bézout's theorem:

Theorem - If f is a homogeneous polynomial of degree $\delta$, which is not a zero divisor in R, then the degree of the intersection of V with the hypersurface defined by $f$ is the product of the degree of V by $\delta.$

In a more geometrical form, this may restated as:

Theorem - If a projective hypersurface of degree d does not contain any irreducible component of an algebraic set of degree δ, then the degree of their intersection is dδ.

The usual Bézout's theorem is easily deduced by starting from a hypersurface, and intersecting it with n − 1 other hypersurfaces, one after the other.

== Complete intersection ==
A projective algebraic set is a complete intersection if its defining ideal is generated by a regular sequence. In this case, there is a simple explicit formula for the Hilbert series.

Let $f_1, \ldots, f_k$ be k homogeneous polynomials in $R=K[x_1, \ldots, x_n]$, of respective degrees $\delta_1, \ldots, \delta_k.$ Setting $R_i=R/\langle f_1, \ldots, f_i\rangle,$ one has the following exact sequences

$$0 \;\rightarrow\; R_{i-1}^{[\delta_i]}\; \xrightarrow{f_i}\; R_{i-1} \;\rightarrow\; R_i\; \rightarrow\; 0\,.$$

The additivity of Hilbert series implies thus

$$HS_{R_i}(t)=(1-t^{\delta_i})HS_{R_{i-1}}(t)\,.$$

A simple recursion gives

$$HS_{R_k}(t)=\frac{(1-t^{\delta_1})\cdots (1-t^{\delta_k})}{(1-t)^n}= \frac{(1+t+\cdots+t^{\delta_1-1})\cdots (1+t+\cdots+t^{\delta_k-1})}{(1-t)^{n-k}}\,.$$

This shows that the complete intersection defined by a regular sequence of k polynomials has a codimension of k, and that its degree is the product of the degrees of the polynomials in the sequence.

== Relation with free resolutions ==
Every graded module M over a graded regular ring R has a graded free resolution because of the Hilbert syzygy theorem, meaning there exists an exact sequence

$$0 \to L_k \to \cdots \to L_1 \to M \to 0,$$

where the $L_i$ are graded free modules, and the arrows are graded linear maps of degree zero.

The additivity of Hilbert series implies that

$$HS_M(t) =\sum_{i=1}^k (-1)^{i-1}HS_{L_i}(t).$$

If $R=k[x_1, \ldots, x_n]$ is a polynomial ring, and if one knows the degrees of the basis elements of the $L_i,$ then the formulas of the preceding sections allow deducing $HS_M(t)$ from $HS_R(t) = 1/(1-t)^n.$ In fact, these formulas imply that, if a graded free module L has a basis of h homogeneous elements of degrees $\delta_1, \ldots, \delta_h,$ then its Hilbert series is

$$HS_L(t) = \frac{t^{\delta_1}+\cdots +t^{\delta_h}}{(1-t)^n}.$$

These formulas may be viewed as a way for computing Hilbert series. This is rarely the case, as, with the known algorithms, the computation of the Hilbert series and the computation of a free resolution start from the same Gröbner basis, from which the Hilbert series may be directly computed with a computational complexity which is not higher than that the complexity of the computation of the free resolution.

== Computation of Hilbert series and Hilbert polynomial ==
The Hilbert polynomial is easily deducible from the Hilbert series (see above). This section describes how the Hilbert series may be computed in the case of a quotient of a polynomial ring, filtered or graded by the total degree.

Thus let K be a field, $R=K[x_1,\ldots,x_n]$ be a polynomial ring and I be an ideal in R. Let H be the homogeneous ideal generated by the homogeneous parts of highest degree of the elements of I. If I is homogeneous, then H=I. Finally let B be a Gröbner basis of I for a monomial ordering refining the total degree partial ordering and G the (homogeneous) ideal generated by the leading monomials of the elements of B.

The computation of the Hilbert series is based on the fact that the filtered algebra R/I and the graded algebras R/H and R/G have the same Hilbert series.

Thus the computation of the Hilbert series is reduced, through the computation of a Gröbner basis, to the same problem for an ideal generated by monomials, which is usually much easier than the computation of the Gröbner basis. The computational complexity of the whole computation depends mainly on the regularity, which is the degree of the numerator of the Hilbert series. In fact the Gröbner basis may be computed by linear algebra over the polynomials of degree bounded by the regularity.

The computation of Hilbert series and Hilbert polynomials are available in most computer algebra systems. For example in both Maple and Magma these functions are named HilbertSeries and HilbertPolynomial.

== Generalization to coherent sheaves ==
In algebraic geometry, graded rings generated by elements of degree 1 produce projective schemes by Proj construction while finitely generated graded modules correspond to coherent sheaves. If $\mathcal{F}$ is a coherent sheaf over a projective scheme X, we define the Hilbert polynomial of $\mathcal{F}$ as a function $p_{\mathcal{F}}(m) = \chi(X, \mathcal{F}(m))$, where χ is the Euler characteristic of coherent sheaf, and $\mathcal{F}(m)$ a Serre twist. The Euler characteristic in this case is a well-defined number by Grothendieck's finiteness theorem.

This function is indeed a polynomial. For large m it agrees with dim $H^0(X, \mathcal{F}(m))$ by Serre's vanishing theorem. If M is a finitely generated graded module and $\tilde{M}$ the associated coherent sheaf the two definitions of Hilbert polynomial agree.

=== Graded free resolutions ===
Since the category of coherent sheaves on a projective variety $X$ is equivalent to the category of graded-modules modulo a finite number of graded-pieces, we can use the results in the previous section to construct Hilbert polynomials of coherent sheaves. For example, a complete intersection $X$ of multi-degree $(d_1,d_2)$ has the resolution

$$0 \to \mathcal{O}_{\mathbb{P}^n}(-d_1-d_2) \xrightarrow{\begin{bmatrix} f_2 \\ -f_1 \end{bmatrix}} \mathcal{O}_{\mathbb{P}^n}(-d_1)\oplus\mathcal{O}_{\mathbb{P}^n}(-d_2) \xrightarrow{\begin{bmatrix}f_1 & f_2 \end{bmatrix}} \mathcal{O}_{\mathbb{P}^n} \to \mathcal{O}_X \to 0$$

== See also ==
- Castelnuovo–Mumford regularity
- Hilbert scheme
- Quot scheme
