= Artin approximation theorem =

1969 result in deformation theory

In mathematics, the Artin approximation theorem is a fundamental result of Michael Artin (1969) in deformation theory which implies that formal power series with coefficients in a field k are well-approximated by the algebraic functions on k.

More precisely, Artin proved two such theorems: one, in 1968, on approximation of complex analytic solutions by formal solutions (in the case $k = \Complex$); and an algebraic version of this theorem in 1969.

== Statement of the theorem ==
Let $\mathbf{x} = x_1, \dots, x_n$ denote a collection of n indeterminates, $k[[\mathbf{x}]]$ the ring of formal power series with indeterminates $\mathbf{x}$ over a field k, and $\mathbf{y} = y_1, \dots, y_n$ a different set of indeterminates. Let

$$f(\mathbf{x}, \mathbf{y}) = 0$$

be a system of polynomial equations in $k[\mathbf{x}, \mathbf{y}]$, and c a positive integer. Then given a formal power series solution $\hat{\mathbf{y}}(\mathbf{x}) \in k[[\mathbf{x}]]$, there is an algebraic solution $\mathbf{y}(\mathbf{x})$ consisting of algebraic functions (more precisely, algebraic power series) such that

$$\hat{\mathbf{y}}(\mathbf{x})  \equiv \mathbf{y}(\mathbf{x}) \bmod (\mathbf{x})^c.$$

== Discussion ==
Given any desired positive integer c, this theorem shows that one can find an algebraic solution approximating a formal power series solution up to the degree specified by c. This leads to theorems that deduce the existence of certain formal moduli spaces of deformations as schemes. See also: Artin's criterion.

== Alternative statement ==
The following alternative statement is given in Theorem 1.12 of Michael Artin (1969).

Let $R$ be a field or an excellent discrete valuation ring, let $A$ be the henselization at a prime ideal of an $R$-algebra of finite type, let m be a proper ideal of $A$, let $\hat{A}$ be the m-adic completion of $A$, and let

$$F\colon (A\text{-algebras}) \to (\text{sets}),$$

be a functor sending filtered colimits to filtered colimits (Artin calls such a functor locally of finite presentation). Then for any integer c and any $\overline{\xi} \in F(\hat{A})$, there is a $\xi \in F(A)$ such that

$$\overline{\xi} \equiv \xi \bmod m^c$$.

== See also ==
- Ring with the approximation property
- Popescu's theorem
- Artin's criterion
