= Quot scheme =

In algebraic geometry, the Quot scheme is a scheme parametrizing sheaves on a projective scheme. More specifically, if X is a projective scheme over a Noetherian scheme S and if F is a coherent sheaf on X, then there is a scheme $\operatorname{Quot}_F(X)$ whose set of T-points $\operatorname{Quot}_F(X)(T) = \operatorname{Mor}_S(T, \operatorname{Quot}_F(X))$ is the set of isomorphism classes of the quotients of $F \times_S T$ that are flat over T. The notion was introduced by Alexander Grothendieck.

It is typically used to construct another scheme parametrizing geometric objects that are of interest such as a Hilbert scheme. (In fact, taking F to be the structure sheaf $\mathcal{O}_X$ gives a Hilbert scheme.)

== Definition ==
For a scheme of finite type $X \to S$ over a Noetherian base scheme $S$, and a coherent sheaf $\mathcal{E} \in \text{Coh}(X)$, there is a functor

$\mathcal{Quot}_{\mathcal{E}/X/S}: (Sch/S)^{op} \to \text{Sets}$

sending $T \to S$ to

$$\mathcal{Quot}_{\mathcal{E}/X/S}(T) = \left\{
(\mathcal{F}, q) : \begin{matrix}
\mathcal{F}\in \text{QCoh}(X_T) \\
\mathcal{F}\ \text{finitely presented over}\ X_T \\
\text{Supp}(\mathcal{F}) \text{ is proper over } T \\
\mathcal{F} \text{ is flat over } T \\
q: \mathcal{E}_T \to \mathcal{F} \text{ surjective}
\end{matrix}
\right\}/ \sim$$

where $X_T = X\times_ST$ and $\mathcal{E}_T = pr_X^*\mathcal{E}$ under the projection $pr_X: X_T \to X$. There is an equivalence relation given by $(\mathcal{F},q) \sim (\mathcal{F}',q')$ if there is an isomorphism $\mathcal{F} \to \mathcal{F}'$ commuting with the two projections $q, q'$; that is,

$$\begin{matrix}
\mathcal{E}_T & \xrightarrow{q} & \mathcal{F} \\
\downarrow{} & & \downarrow \\
\mathcal{E}_T & \xrightarrow{q'} & \mathcal{F}'
\end{matrix}$$

is a commutative diagram for $\mathcal{E}_T \xrightarrow{id} \mathcal{E}_T$ . Alternatively, there is an equivalent condition of holding $\text{ker}(q) = \text{ker}(q')$. This is called the quot functor which has a natural stratification into a disjoint union of subfunctors, each of which is represented by a projective $S$-scheme called the quot scheme associated to a Hilbert polynomial $\Phi$.

=== Hilbert polynomial ===
For a relatively very ample line bundle $\mathcal{L} \in \text{Pic}(X)$ and any closed point $s \in S$ there is a function $\Phi_\mathcal{F}: \mathbb{N} \to \mathbb{N}$ sending

$m \mapsto \chi(\mathcal{F}_s(m)) = \sum_{i=0}^n (-1)^i\text{dim}_{\kappa(s)}H^i(X,\mathcal{F}_s\otimes \mathcal{L}_s^{\otimes m})$

which is a polynomial for $m >> 0$. This is called the Hilbert polynomial which gives a natural stratification of the quot functor. Again, for $\mathcal{L}$ fixed there is a disjoint union of subfunctors

$\mathcal{Quot}_{\mathcal{E}/X/S} = \coprod_{\Phi \in \mathbb{Q}[t]} \mathcal{Quot}_{\mathcal{E}/X/S}^{\Phi,\mathcal{L}}$

where

$\mathcal{Quot}_{\mathcal{E}/X/S}^{\Phi,\mathcal{L}}(T) = \left\{ (\mathcal{F},q) \in \mathcal{Quot}_{\mathcal{E}/X/S}(T) : \Phi_\mathcal{F} = \Phi \right\}$

The Hilbert polynomial $\Phi_\mathcal{F}$ is the Hilbert polynomial of $\mathcal{F}_t$ for closed points $t \in T$. Note the Hilbert polynomial is independent of the choice of very ample line bundle $\mathcal{L}$.

=== Grothendieck's existence theorem ===
It is a theorem of Grothendieck's that the functors $\mathcal{Quot}_{\mathcal{E}/X/S}^{\Phi,\mathcal{L}}$ are all representable by projective schemes $\text{Quot}_{\mathcal{E}/X/S}^{\Phi}$ over $S$.

== Examples ==
=== Grassmannian ===
The Grassmannian $G(n,k)$ of $k$-planes in an $n$-dimensional vector space has a universal quotient

$\mathcal{O}_{G(n,k)}^{\oplus k} \to \mathcal{U}$

where $\mathcal{U}_x$ is the $k$-plane represented by $x \in G(n,k)$. Since $\mathcal{U}$ is locally free and at every point it represents a $k$-plane, it has the constant Hilbert polynomial $\Phi(\lambda) = k$. This shows $G(n,k)$ represents the quot functor

$\mathcal{Quot}_{\mathcal{O}_{G(n,k)}^{\oplus(n)}/\text{Spec}(\mathbb{Z})/\text{Spec}(\mathbb{Z})}^{k,\mathcal{O}_{G(n,k)}}$

==== Projective space ====
As a special case, we can construct the projective bundle $\mathbb{P}(\mathcal{E})$ over $X$ as the quot scheme

$\mathcal{Quot}^{1,\mathcal{O}_X}_{\mathcal{E}/X/S}$

for a sheaf $\mathcal{E}$ on an $S$-scheme $X$.

=== Hilbert scheme ===
The Hilbert scheme is a special example of the quot scheme. Notice a subscheme $Z \subset X$ can be given as a projection

$\mathcal{O}_X \to \mathcal{O}_Z$

and a flat family of such projections parametrized by a scheme $T \in Sch/S$ can be given by

$\mathcal{O}_{X_T} \to \mathcal{F}$

Since there is a hilbert polynomial associated to $Z$, denoted $\Phi_Z$, there is an isomorphism of schemes

$\text{Quot}_{\mathcal{O}_X/X/S}^{\Phi_Z} \cong \text{Hilb}_{X/S}^{\Phi_Z}$

==== Example of a parameterization ====
If $X = \mathbb{P}^n_{k}$ and $S = \text{Spec}(k)$ for an algebraically closed field, then a non-zero section $s \in \Gamma(\mathcal{O}(d))$ has vanishing locus $Z = Z(s)$ with Hilbert polynomial

$\Phi_Z(\lambda) = \binom{n+\lambda}{n} - \binom{n-d+\lambda}{n}$

Then, there is a surjection

$\mathcal{O} \to \mathcal{O}_Z$

with kernel $\mathcal{O}(-d)$. Since $s$ was an arbitrary non-zero section, and the vanishing locus of $a\cdot s$ for $a \in k^*$ gives the same vanishing locus, the scheme $Q=\mathbb{P}(\Gamma(\mathcal{O}(d)))$ gives a natural parameterization of all such sections. There is a sheaf $\mathcal{E}$ on $X\times Q$ such that for any $[s] \in Q$, there is an associated subscheme $Z \subset X$ and surjection $\mathcal{O} \to \mathcal{O}_Z$. This construction represents the quot functor

$\mathcal{Quot}_{\mathcal{O}/\mathbb{P}^n/\text{Spec}(k)}^{\Phi_Z}$

==== Quadrics in the projective plane ====
If $X = \mathbb{P}^2$ and $s \in \Gamma(\mathcal{O}(2))$, the Hilbert polynomial is

$$\begin{align}
\Phi_Z(\lambda) &= \binom{2 + \lambda}{2} - \binom{2 - 2 + \lambda}{2} \\
&= \frac{(\lambda + 2)(\lambda + 1)}{2} - \frac{\lambda(\lambda - 1)}{2} \\
&= \frac{\lambda^2 + 3\lambda + 2}{2} - \frac{\lambda^2 - \lambda}{2} \\
&= \frac{2\lambda + 2}{2} \\
&= \lambda + 1
\end{align}$$

and

$\text{Quot}_{\mathcal{O}/\mathbb{P}^2/\text{Spec}(k)}^{\lambda + 1} \cong \mathbb{P}(\Gamma(\mathcal{O}(2))) \cong \mathbb{P}^{5}$

The universal quotient over $\mathbb{P}^5\times\mathbb{P}^2$ is given by

$\mathcal{O} \to \mathcal{U}$

where the fiber over a point $[Z] \in \text{Quot}_{\mathcal{O}/\mathbb{P}^2/\text{Spec}(k)}^{\lambda + 1}$ gives the projective morphism

$\mathcal{O} \to \mathcal{O}_Z$

For example, if $[Z] = [a_{0}:a_{1}:a_{2}:a_{3}:a_{4}:a_{5}]$ represents the coefficients of

$f = a_0x^2 + a_1xy + a_2xz + a_3y^2 + a_4yz + a_5z^2$

then the universal quotient over $[Z]$ gives the short exact sequence

$0 \to \mathcal{O}(-2)\xrightarrow{f}\mathcal{O} \to \mathcal{O}_Z \to 0$

=== Semistable vector bundles on a curve ===
Semistable vector bundles on a curve $C$ of genus $g$ can equivalently be described as locally free sheaves of finite rank. Such locally free sheaves $\mathcal{F}$ of rank $n$ and degree $d$ have the properties

1. $H^1(C,\mathcal{F}) = 0$
2. $\mathcal{F}$ is generated by global sections

for $d > n(2g-1)$. This implies there is a surjection

$H^0(C,\mathcal{F})\otimes \mathcal{O}_C \cong \mathcal{O}_C^{\oplus N} \to \mathcal{F}$

Then, the quot scheme $\mathcal{Quot}_{\mathcal{O}_C^{\oplus N}/\mathcal{C}/\mathbb{Z}}$ parametrizes all such surjections. Using the Grothendieck–Riemann–Roch theorem the dimension $N$ is equal to

$\chi(\mathcal{F}) = d + n(1-g)$

For a fixed line bundle $\mathcal{L}$ of degree $1$ there is a twisting $\mathcal{F}(m) = \mathcal{F} \otimes \mathcal{L}^{\otimes m}$, shifting the degree by $nm$, so

$\chi(\mathcal{F}(m)) = mn + d + n(1-g)$

giving the Hilbert polynomial

$\Phi_\mathcal{F}(\lambda) = n\lambda + d + n(1-g)$

Then, the locus of semi-stable vector bundles is contained in

$\mathcal{Quot}_{\mathcal{O}_C^{\oplus N}/\mathcal{C}/\mathbb{Z}}^{\Phi_\mathcal{F}, \mathcal{L}}$

which can be used to construct the moduli space $\mathcal{M}_C(n,d)$ of semistable vector bundles using a GIT quotient.

== See also ==
- Hilbert polynomial
- Flat morphism
- Hilbert scheme
- Moduli space
- GIT quotient
