= Teruhisa Matsusaka =

Japanese-American mathematician (1926–2006)

- Born: 5 April 1926
- Died: 4 March 2006 (aged 79)
- Education: Kyoto University
- Known for: Matsusaka's Criterion; Matsusaka's Big Theorem
- Scientific career
- Fields: Algebraic geometry
- Workplaces: Brandeis University
- Doctoral advisor: Yasuo Akizuki
- Doctoral students: János Kollár

Teruhisa Matsusaka (松阪 輝久, Matsusaka Teruhisa) (1926–2006) was a Japanese-born American mathematician, who specialized in algebraic geometry.

Matsusaka received his Ph.D. in 1954 at Kyoto University; he was a member of the Brandeis Mathematics Department from 1961 until his retirement in 1994, and was that department's chair from 1984–1986. He was invited to address the International Congress of Mathematicians held in Edinburgh in 1958 and was elected to the American Academy of Arts and Sciences in 1966.

During the difficult years after the Second World War, Matsusaka worked on several problems connected with Weil's Foundations of Algebraic Geometry. This led to a correspondence and eventually Weil invited Matsusaka to the University of Chicago (1954–57) where they became life-long friends. After three years at Northwestern University and a year at the Institute for Advanced Study, Princeton, he went to Brandeis University in 1961 where he stayed until 1994, helping to build the department to its current prominence.

Matsusaka was awarded a Guggenheim Fellowship for the academic year 1959–1960.

In 1972, Matsusaka introduced Matsusaka's big theorem, a key technical result on ample line bundles.

== Selected publications ==
- Matsusaka, Teruhisa (1952). "On the algebraic construction of the Picard variety". Proc. Japan Acad. 28 (1): 5–8. doi:10.3792/pja/1195571116. MR 0048858.
- Matsusaka, Teruhisa (1956). "Polarized varieties, the field of moduli and generalized Kummer varieties of abelian varieties". Proc. Japan Acad. 32 (6): 367–372. doi:10.3792/pja/1195525333. MR 0079815.
- Matsusaka, Teruhisa (1959). "On a characterization of a Jacobian variety". Mem. College Sci. Univ. Kyoto Ser. A Math. 32 (1): 1–19. doi:10.1215/kjm/1250776695. MR 0108497.
- Theory of Q-varieties. Vol. 8. Mathematical society of Japan. 1964; 158 pp.
- Matsusaka, T. (1972). "Polarized varieties with a given Hilbert polynomial". American Journal of Mathematics. 94 (4): 1027–1077. doi:10.2307/2373563. JSTOR 2373563.
- Matsusaka, T. (1974). "Global deformation of polarized varieties". Bull. Amer. Math. Soc. 80 (1): 1–7. doi:10.1090/s0002-9904-1974-13340-9. MR 0364246.
