= Hilbert scheme =

Moduli scheme of subschemes of a scheme, represents the flat-family-of-subschemes functor

In algebraic geometry, a branch of mathematics, a Hilbert scheme is a scheme that is the parameter space for the closed subschemes of some projective space (or a more general projective scheme), refining the Chow variety. The Hilbert scheme is a disjoint union of projective subschemes corresponding to Hilbert polynomials. The basic theory of Hilbert schemes was developed by Alexander Grothendieck (1961). Hironaka's example shows that non-projective varieties need not have Hilbert schemes.

== Hilbert scheme of projective space ==
The Hilbert scheme $\mathbf{Hilb}(n)$ of $\mathbb{P}^n$ classifies closed subschemes of projective space in the following sense: For any locally Noetherian scheme S, the set of S-valued points

$$\operatorname{Hom}(S, \mathbf{Hilb}(n))$$

of the Hilbert scheme is naturally isomorphic to the set of closed subschemes of $\mathbb{P}^n \times S$ that are flat over S. The closed subschemes of $\mathbb{P}^n \times S$ that are flat over S can informally be thought of as the families of subschemes of projective space parameterized by S. The Hilbert scheme $\mathbf{Hilb}(n)$ breaks up as a disjoint union of pieces $\mathbf{Hilb}(n, P)$ corresponding to the Hilbert scheme of the subschemes of projective space with Hilbert polynomial P. Each of these pieces is projective over $\operatorname{Spec}(\Z)$.

=== Construction as a determinantal variety ===
Grothendieck constructed the Hilbert scheme $\mathbf{Hilb}(n)$ of $n$-dimensional projective $\mathbb{P}^n$ space as a subscheme of a Grassmannian defined by the vanishing of various determinants. Its fundamental property is that for a scheme $T$, it represents the functor whose $T$-valued points are the closed subschemes of $\mathbb{P}^n \times T$ that are flat over $T$.

If $X$ is a subscheme of $n$-dimensional projective space, then $X$ corresponds to a graded ideal $I_X^\bullet$ of the polynomial ring $S$ in $n+1$ variables, with graded pieces $I_X^m$. For sufficiently large $m$ all higher cohomology groups of $X$ with coefficients in $\mathcal{O}(m)$ vanish. Using the exact sequence

$0 \to I_X \to \mathcal{O}_{\mathbb{P}^n} \to \mathcal{O}_X \to 0$

we have $I_X^m = \Gamma(I_X\otimes \mathcal{O}_{\mathbb{P}^n}(m))$ has dimension $Q(m) - P_X(m)$, where $Q$ is the Hilbert polynomial of projective space. This can be shown by tensoring the exact sequence above by the locally flat sheaves $\mathcal{O}_{\mathbb{P}^n}(m)$, giving an exact sequence where the latter two terms have trivial cohomology, implying the triviality of the higher cohomology of $I_X(m)$. Note that we are using the equality of the Hilbert polynomial of a coherent sheaf with the Euler-characteristic of its sheaf cohomology groups.

Pick a sufficiently large value of $m$. The $(Q(m) - P_X(m))$-dimensional space $I_X^m$ is a subspace of the $Q(m)$-dimensional space $S^m$, so represents a point of the Grassmannian $\textbf{Gr}(Q(m)-P_X(m), Q(m))$. This will give an embedding of the piece of the Hilbert scheme corresponding to the Hilbert polynomial $P_X$ into this Grassmannian.

It remains to describe the scheme structure on this image, in other words to describe enough elements for the ideal corresponding to it. Enough such elements are given by the conditions that the map I_{X}(m) ⊗ S(k) → S(k + m) has rank at most dim(I_{X}(k + m)) for all positive k, which is equivalent to the vanishing of various determinants. (A more careful analysis shows that it is enough just to take k = 1.)

==== Universality ====
Given a closed subscheme $Y \subset \mathbb{P}^n_k=X$ over a field with Hilbert polynomial $P$, the Hilbert scheme H=Hilb(n, P) has a universal subscheme $W \subset X \times H$ flat over $H$ such that

- The fibers $W_x$ over closed points $x \in H$ are closed subschemes of $X$. For $Y \subset X$ denote this point $x$ as $[Y] \in H$.
- $H$ is universal with respect to all flat families of subschemes of $X$ having Hilbert polynomial $P$. That is, given a scheme $T$ and a flat family $W' \subset X\times T$, there is a unique morphism $\phi: T \to H$ such that $\phi^*W \cong W'$.

==== Tangent space ====
The tangent space of the point $[Y] \in H$ is given by the global sections of the normal bundle $N_{Y/X}$; that is,

$$T_{[Y]}H = H^0(Y, N_{Y/X})$$

==== Unobstructedness of complete intersections ====
For local complete intersections $Y$ such that $H^1(Y,N_{X/Y}) = 0$, the point $[Y]\in H$ is smooth. This implies every deformation of $Y$ in $X$ is unobstructed.

==== Dimension of tangent space ====
In the case $H^1(Y,N_{X/Y}) \neq 0$, the dimension of $H$ at $[Y]$ is greater than or equal to $h^0(Y,N_{X/Y}) - h^1(Y,N_{X/Y})$.

In addition to these properties, Francis Sowerby Macaulay (1927) determined for which polynomials the Hilbert scheme $\mathbf{Hilb}(n, P)$ is non-empty, and Robin Hartshorne (1966) showed that if $\mathbf{Hilb}(n, P)$ is non-empty then it is linearly connected. So two subschemes of projective space are in the same connected component of the Hilbert scheme if and only if they have the same Hilbert polynomial.

Hilbert schemes can have bad singularities, such as irreducible components that are non-reduced at all points. They can also have irreducible components of unexpectedly high dimension. For example, one might expect the Hilbert scheme of d points (more precisely dimension 0, length d subschemes) of a scheme of dimension n to have dimension dn, but if n ≥ 3 its irreducible components can have much larger dimension.

== Functorial interpretation ==
There is an alternative interpretation of the Hilbert scheme which leads to a generalization of relative Hilbert schemes parameterizing subschemes of a relative scheme. For a fixed base scheme $S$, let $X \in (Sch/S)$ and let

$\underline{ \text{Hilb} }_{X/S}:(Sch/S)^{op} \to Sets$

be the functor sending a relative scheme $T \to S$ to the set of isomorphism classes of the set

$$\underline{
\text{Hilb}
}_{X/S}(T) = \left\{
\begin{matrix}
Z & \hookrightarrow & X \times_S T & \to & X \\
\downarrow & & \downarrow & & \downarrow \\
T & = & T & \to & S
\end{matrix}
: Z \to T \text{ is flat}
\right\} / \sim$$

where the equivalence relation is given by the isomorphism classes of $Z$. This construction is functorial by taking pullbacks of families. Given $f: T' \to T$, there is a family $f^*Z = Z\times_TT'$ over $T'$.

=== Representability for projective maps ===
If the structure map $X \to S$ is projective, then this functor is represented by the Hilbert scheme constructed above. Generalizing this to the case of maps of finite type requires the technology of algebraic spaces developed by Artin.

=== Relative Hilbert scheme for maps of algebraic spaces ===
In its greatest generality, the Hilbert functor is defined for a finite type map of algebraic spaces $f\colon X \to B$ defined over a scheme $S$. Then, the Hilbert functor is defined as

$$\underline{\text{Hilb}}_{X/B}:(Sch/B)^{op} \to Sets$$

sending T to

$$\underline{\text{Hilb}}_{X/B}(T) = \left\{ Z \subset X\times_BT :
\begin{align}
&Z \to T \text{ is flat, proper,} \\
&\text{and of finite presentation}
\end{align}
\right\}$$.

This functor is not representable by a scheme, but by an algebraic space. Also, if $S = \text{Spec}(\Z)$, and $X\to B$ is a finite type map of schemes, their Hilbert functor is represented by an algebraic space.

== Examples of Hilbert schemes ==
=== Fano schemes of hypersurfaces ===
One of the motivating examples for the investigation of the Hilbert scheme in general was the Fano scheme of a projective scheme. Given a subscheme $X \subset \mathbb{P}^n$ of degree $d$, there is a scheme $F_k(X)$ in $\mathbb{G}(k, n)$ parameterizing $H \subset X \subset \mathbb{P}^n$ where $H$ is a $k$-plane in $\mathbb{P}^n$, meaning it is a degree one embedding of $\mathbb{P}^k$. For smooth surfaces in $\mathbb{P}^3$ of degree $d \geq 3$, the non-empty Fano schemes $F_k(X)$ are smooth and zero-dimensional. This is because lines on smooth surfaces have negative self-intersection.

=== Hilbert scheme of points ===
Another common set of examples are the Hilbert schemes of $n$-points of a scheme $X$, typically denoted $X^{[n]}$. For a Riemann surface X, $X^{[n]}=S^nX=X^n/S_n$. For $\mathbb{P}^2$ there is a nice geometric interpretation where the boundary loci $B \subset H$ describing the intersection of points can be thought of parametrizing points along with their tangent vectors. For example, $(\mathbb{P}^2)^{[2]}$ is the blowup $Bl_{\Delta}(\mathbb{P}^2\times\mathbb{P}^2/S_2)$ of the diagonal modulo the symmetric action.

=== Degree d hypersurfaces ===
The Hilbert scheme of degree k hypersurfaces in $\mathbb{P}^n$ is given by the projectivization $\mathbb{P}(\Gamma(\mathcal{O}(k)))$. For example, the Hilbert scheme of degree 2 hypersurfaces in $\mathbb{P}^1$ is $\mathbb{P}^2$ with the universal hypersurface given by

$$\text{Proj}(k[x_0,x_1][\alpha,\beta,\gamma]/(\alpha x_0^2 + \beta x_0x_1 + \gamma x_1^2)) \subseteq \mathbb{P}_{x_0,x_1}^1\times\mathbb{P}^2_{\alpha,\beta,\gamma}$$

where the underlying ring is bigraded.

=== Hilbert scheme of curves and moduli of curves ===
For a fixed genus $g$ algebraic curve $C$, the degree of the tri-tensored dualizing sheaf $\omega_C^{\otimes 3}$ is globally generated, meaning its Euler characteristic is determined by the dimension of the global sections, so

$$\chi(\omega_C^{\otimes 3}) = \dim H^0(C,\omega_X^{\otimes 3})$$.

The dimension of this vector space is $5g-5$, hence the global sections of $\omega_C^{\otimes 3}$ determine an embedding into $\mathbb{P}^{5g-6}$ for every genus $g$ curve. Using the Riemann-Roch formula, the associated Hilbert polynomial can be computed as

$$H_C(t) = 6(g-1)t + (1-g)$$.

Then, the Hilbert scheme

$$\text{Hilb}_{\mathbb{P}^{5g-6}}^{H_C(t)}$$

parameterizes all genus g curves. Constructing this scheme is the first step in the construction of the moduli stack of algebraic curves. The other main technical tool are GIT quotients, since this moduli space is constructed as the quotient

$$\mathcal{M}_g = [U_g/GL_{5g-6}]$$,

where $U_g$ is the sublocus of smooth curves in the Hilbert scheme.

== Hilbert scheme of points on a manifold ==
"Hilbert scheme" sometimes refers to the punctual Hilbert scheme of 0-dimensional subschemes on a scheme. Informally this can be thought of as something like finite collections of points on a scheme, though this picture can be very misleading when several points coincide.

There is a Hilbert–Chow morphism from the reduced Hilbert scheme of points to the Chow variety of cycles taking any 0-dimensional scheme to its associated 0-cycle. (Fogarty 1968, 1969, 1973).

The Hilbert scheme $M^{[n]}$ of n points on M is equipped with a natural morphism to an n-th symmetric product of M. This morphism is birational for M of dimension at most 2. For M of dimension at least 3 the morphism is not birational for large n: the Hilbert scheme is in general reducible and has components of dimension much larger than that of the symmetric product.

The Hilbert scheme of points on a curve C (a dimension-1 complex manifold) is isomorphic to a symmetric power of C. It is smooth.

The Hilbert scheme of n points on a surface is also smooth (Grothendieck). If $n=2$, it is obtained from $M\times M$ by blowing up the diagonal and then dividing by the $\Z/2\Z$ action induced by $(x,y) \mapsto (y,x)$. This was used by Mark Haiman in his proof of the positivity of the coefficients of some Macdonald polynomials.

The Hilbert scheme of a smooth manifold of dimension 3 or more is usually not smooth.

== Hilbert schemes and hyperkähler geometry ==
Let M be a complex Kähler surface with $c_1= 0$ (K3 surface or a torus). The canonical bundle of M is trivial, as follows from the Kodaira classification of surfaces. Hence M admits a holomorphic symplectic form. It was observed by Akira Fujiki (for $n=2$) and Arnaud Beauville that $M^{[n]}$ is also holomorphically symplectic. This is not very difficult to see, e.g., for $n=2$. Indeed, $M^{[2]}$ is a blow-up of a symmetric square of M. Singularities of $\operatorname{Sym}^2 M$ are locally isomorphic to $\Complex^2 \times \Complex^2/\{\pm 1\}$. The blow-up of $\Complex^2/\{\pm 1\}$ is $T^{*}\mathbb{P}^{1}(\Complex)$, and this space is symplectic. This is used to show that the symplectic form is naturally extended to the smooth part of the exceptional divisors of $M^{[n]}$. It is extended to the rest of $M^{[n]}$ by Hartogs' principle.

A holomorphically symplectic, Kähler manifold is hyperkähler, as follows from the Calabi–Yau theorem. Hilbert schemes of points on the K3 surface and on a 4-dimensional torus give two series of examples of hyperkähler manifolds: a Hilbert scheme of points on K3 and a generalized Kummer surface.

== See also ==
- Quot scheme
- Castelnuovo–Mumford regularity
- Matsusaka's big theorem
- Moduli of algebraic curves
- Moduli space
- Hilbert modular surface
- Siegel modular variety
