= Robert J. Berman =

Swedish mathematical scientist

Robert J. Berman is a Swedish mathematical scientist currently at Chalmers University and was awarded the Göran Gustafsson Prize in 2017. Berman is known for his constributions to the K-stability of Fano varieties.
