= Logarithmic pair =

In algebraic geometry, a logarithmic pair consists of a variety, together with a divisor along which one allows mild logarithmic singularities. They were studied by Iitaka (1976).

== Definition ==
A boundary Q-divisor on a variety is a Q-divisor D of the form Σd_{i}D_{i} where the D_{i} are the distinct irreducible components of D and all coefficients are rational numbers with 0≤d_{i}≤1.

A logarithmic pair, or log pair for short, is a pair (X,D) consisting of a normal variety X and a boundary Q-divisor D.

The log canonical divisor of a log pair (X,D) is K+D where K is the canonical divisor of X.

A logarithmic 1-form on a log pair (X,D) is allowed to have logarithmic singularities of the form d log(z) = dz/z along components of the divisor given locally by z=0.
