= Chenyang Xu =

Chinese mathematician

- 许晨阳
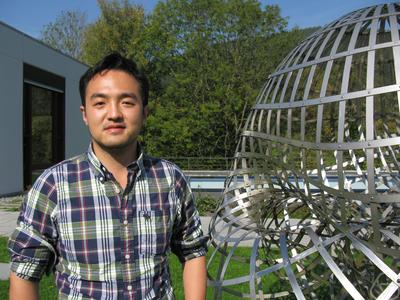
- Xu at Oberwolfach in 2011
- Born: 1981 (age 44–45); Chongqing, China
- Education: Peking University (BS, MS); Princeton University (PhD)
- Scientific career
- Fields: Algebraic geometry
- Workplaces: Massachusetts Institute of Technology; University of Utah; Peking University; Princeton University
- Thesis: Topics on Rationally Connected Varieties (2008)
- Doctoral advisor: János Kollár
- Website: web.math.princeton.edu/~chenyang/

Chenyang Xu (Chinese: 许晨阳; pinyin: Xǔ Chényáng; born 1981) is a Chinese mathematician in the area of algebraic geometry and a professor at Princeton University. Xu is known for his work in birational geometry, the minimal model program, and the K-stability of Fano varieties.

== Career ==
Xu graduated from Peking University with a Bachelor of Science and Master of Science in mathematical sciences in 2003 and 2004, respectively. He then earned his Ph.D. in mathematics from Princeton University under János Kollár's supervision, Xu joined MIT as a CLE Moore Instructor between 2008-2011. After a promotion to assistant professor at the University of Utah, Xu returned to Peking University in 2012 to join the Beijing International Center of Mathematical Research, subsequently promoted to professor in 2013.

In 2018, Xu joined the mathematics faculty at MIT as Professor.

In 2020, Xu moved to Princeton University as Professor.

== Awards ==
In 2016, he was announced as a winner of the ICTP Ramanujan Prize for that year, "in recognition of Xu's outstanding works in algebraic geometry, notably in the area of birational geometry, including works both on log canonical pairs and on Q-Fano varieties, and on the topology of singularities and their dual complexes." He won the 2019 New Horizons Prize for Early-Career Achievement in Mathematics, associated with the Breakthrough Prize in Mathematics for his research in the minimal model program and applications to the moduli of algebraic varieties. In 2021, he received the Cole Prize in Algebra from the AMS. In 2022, he was awarded the Simons Investigator.

He was elected as a Fellow of the American Mathematical Society in the 2020 Class, for "contributions to algebraic geometry, in particular the minimal model program and the K-stability of Fano varieties".

In 2018, he was an invited speaker at the International Congress of Mathematicians (ICM).

In 2018, he became a laureate of the Asian Scientist 100 by the Asian Scientist.

== Selected publications ==
- C. D. Hacon, C. Xu (2013). "Existence of log canonical closures", Inventiones Mathematicae 192 (1), 161–195 49
- C. D. Hacon, J. McKernan, C. Xu (2014). "ACC for log canonical thresholds", Annals of Mathematics 180 (2), 523–571 47
