= Torsten Hoefler =

Computer science professor

Torsten Hoefler MAE
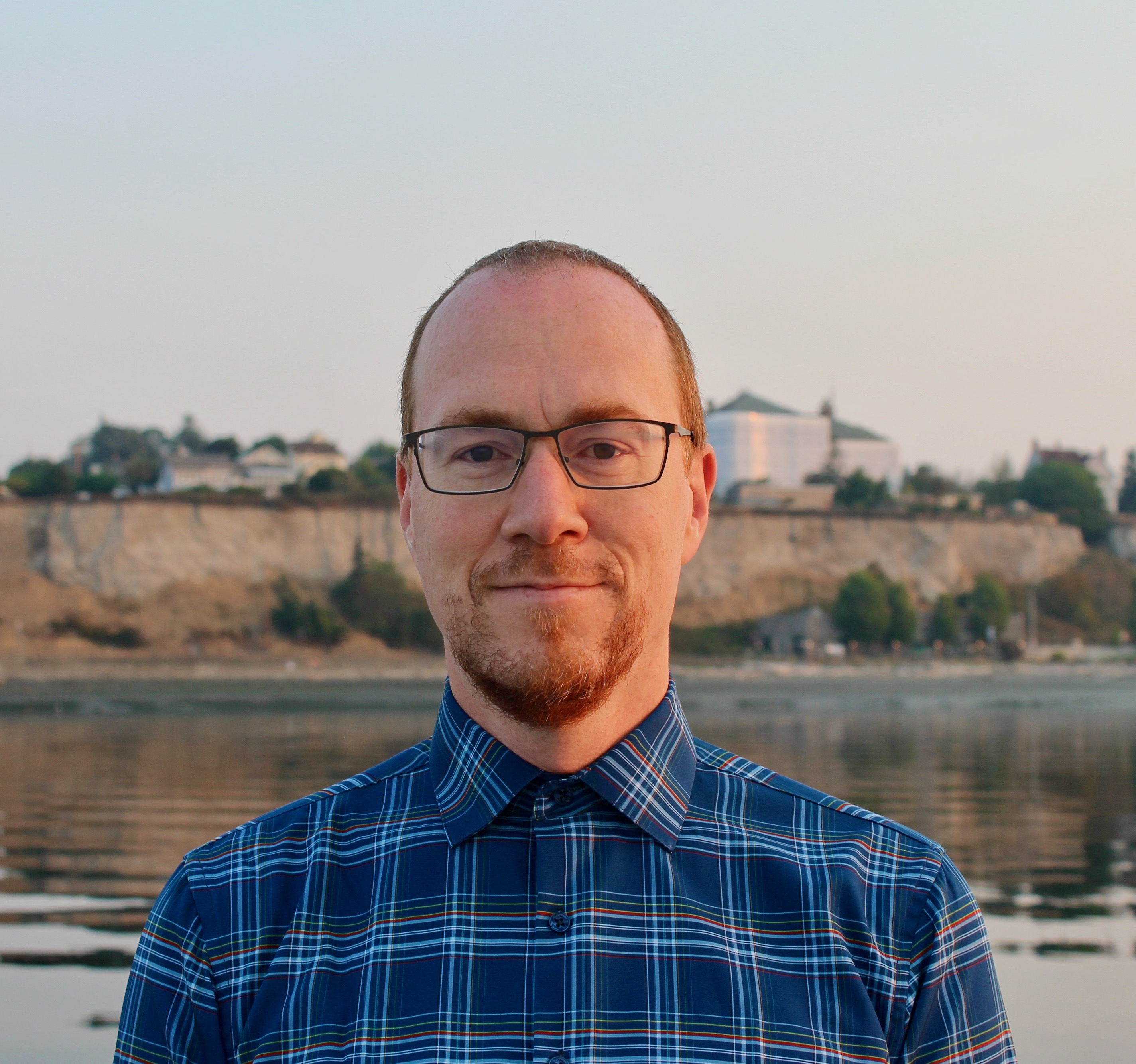
- Education: Indiana University; TU Chemnitz
- Awards: ACM Prize in Computing; Max Planck-Humboldt Medal; ACM Fellow; IEEE CS Sidney Fernbach Award; IEEE Fellow; ACM Gordon Bell Prize; Latsis Prize of ETH Zürich
- Scientific career
- Fields: High-Performance Computing; Computer Science
- Workplaces: ETH Zurich; Swiss National Supercomputing Centre; Microsoft; Cray; University of Illinois at Urbana-Champaign; Indiana University
- Doctoral advisor: Andrew Lumsdaine

Torsten Hoefler is a Professor of Computer Science at ETH Zurich and the Chief Architect for Machine Learning at the Swiss National Supercomputing Centre. He is a laureate of the ACM Prize in Computing for his pioneering work on HPC and large-scale AI systems, where he laid many of the foundations of the quickly-growing AI datacenter industry. Earlier in his career, he led the Advanced Application and User Support team at the Blue Waters Directorate of the National Center for Supercomputing Applications, and held an adjunct professor position at the Computer Science Department at the University of Illinois at Urbana Champaign. His expertise lies in large-scale parallel computing and high-performance computing systems. He focuses on applications in large-scale artificial intelligence as well as climate sciences.

Hoefler is an IEEE Fellow, ACM Fellow, and a member of the European Academy of Sciences Academia Europaea. He is also a Fellow of the European Laboratory for Learning and Intelligent Systems (ELLIS). His Erdos number is two.

He has been invited to present several keynote lectures at major international conferences such as ACM's Federated Computing Research Conference, IEEE Cluster, HPC Asia, Supercomputing Asia, or the International Symposium on Distributed Computing. Hoefler is known to give widely accessible presentations at major interdisciplinary events such as the Heidelberg Laureate Forum, the ADIA Lab Symposium, Science for Development Summit in Timor-Leste following an invitation of president José Ramos-Horta, or the Global Young Scientists Summit in Singapore, all featuring Nobel and Turing laureate speakers.

== Career ==
Hoefler received his Diplom in Computer Science from TU Chemnitz where he received the best student award in 2005. He worked on high-performance computing systems from the very beginning of his career. He continued his studies at Indiana University, the home of Open MPI, under the guidance of Prof. Andrew Lumsdaine. He received his PhD in Computer Science in 2008 from Indiana University and was subsequently honored with the university's Young Alumni Award as well as Distinguished Alumni Award

He continued his work on the Message Passing Interface standard as a key member of the MPI Forum responsible for the chapters on Collective Communication and Process Topologies as well as co-authoring the chapter on One-Sided Communications.

In 2010, he joined the National Center for Supercomputing Applications at the University of Illinois at Urbana-Champaign (UIUC). As lead for application performance analysis and support, he supported the design and deployment of the Blue Waters Supercomputer. He also held a position as adjunct professor at UIUC's Computer Science department. He accepted a position as assistant professor at ETH Zurich in 2011, where he received tenure in 2017, and is full professor from 2020. Since 2017, Hoefler is a long-term scientific advisor to Microsoftwhere he contributes to large-scale AI infrastructure that is used by OpenAI and Microsoft's in-house AI accelerator program Maia.

Hoefler has held various visiting researcher positions at French Alternative Energies and Atomic Energy Commission in France, CINECA in Italy, as well as Argonne National Laboratory, Sandia National Laboratory, and Microsoft in the United States. As a consultant, he supported Cray Inc. in the area of high-performance networking and Microsoft Corporation in the areas of quantum computing and large-scale artificial intelligence systems. He spent his sabbatical in 2019 at Microsoft helping to establish various AI supercomputing efforts including the Maia 100 system.

Hoefler has been an elected member of the ACM SIGHPC executive committee since its founding in 2011.

He was elected IEEE Fellow for “contributions to large-scale parallel processing systems and supercomputers”, ACM Fellow for “foundational contributions to High-Performance Computing and the application of HPC techniques to machine learning”, and he received the IEEE Sidney Fernbach Award in 2022 for “application-aware design of HPC algorithms, systems and architectures, and transformative impact on scientific computing and industry”.

Hoefler received the inaugural Jack Dongarra award at ISC High Performance Conference in 2023. He was appointed as a senior fellow of the Abu Dhabi Investment Authority Labs in 2023.

== Research impact ==
Hoefler is known for his contributions to the Message Passing Interface (MPI) standard. He served as author for the chapters “Collective Communication” and “Process Topologies” in MPI-2.2 and the chapters “Collective Communication”, “One-Sided Communications”, and “Process Topologies” in MPI-3 . For the MPI-3 standardization, he chaired the Collective Communications and Topology working groups.

He developed principles for the implementation of nonblocking collective operations and remote memory access that are widely used in MPI implementations such as OpenMPI, MPICH, and derivatives. Nonblocking collective operations such as allreduce, allgather, or broadcast form the basis of modern AI training systems.

After co-authoring a pioneering paper on parallel deep learning and during his sabbatical at Microsoft, he coined the term “3D parallelism” in modern artificial intelligence training that organizes data parallelism, pipeline parallelism, and operator/tensor parallelism into one consistent view.

In his work on high-speed interconnects, he co-developed several award-winning network topologies and contributed routing algorithms that are used in the OpenSM routing manager on InfiniBand computer clusters. He co-chaired the Transport Working Group in Ultra Ethernet 1.0, which defines a next-generation interconnect for Artificial Intelligence and High-performance computing networking. He was recognized with the Ultra Ethernet Consortium Visionary Leadership Award in 2025.

On the application side, Hoefler focuses on improving the performance of climate simulations as a digital twin and machine learning for climate simulations. He has been a convener of the Berlin Summit in Earth Virtualization Engines to develop strategies to enable global access to high-resolution climate simulations.

In the AI space, he contributed to key ideas for language model optimization on modern systems for both training and inference. He also contributed to the software and hardware architecture of Microsoft's Maia software-defined dataflow accelerator.

=== Scientific reproducibility ===
Hoefler has been vocal about improving reproducibility of performance measurements in high-performance computing and later machine learning. The latter is featured in IEEE Computer Journal as a cover feature on Research Reproducibility. As Technical Papers chair of ACM/IEEE Supercomputing Conference (SC18), he introduced a new revision-based review process to the conference to improve the quality of the publications. His group received the SIGHPC Certificate of Appreciation for reproducible methods at the ACM/IEEE Supercomputing Conference (SC22) ACM student cluster competition. His paper on HammingMesh received the ACM/IEEE Supercomputing Conference (SC22) Best Reproducibility Advancement Award. He also presented the opening keynote at the first ACM Conference on Reproducibility and Replicability.

== Awards and honors ==
Hoefler and his team received six best (student) paper awards at the ACM/IEEE Supercomputing Conference between 2010 and 2023, the top conference in High-Performance Computing. Additional important awards are listed below.

2025

- ACM Prize in Computing
- ACM Gordon Bell Prize in Climate Modeling
- Ultra Ethernet Consortium Visionary Leadership Award

2024

- Max Planck Humboldt Medal jointly awarded by the Max Planck Society, the Alexander von Humboldt Foundation, and the German Federal Ministry of Education and Research.

2023

- ACM Fellow, class of 2022
- Jack Dongarra Early Career Award

2022

- IEEE CS Sidney Fernbach Award
- Luddy Distinguished Alumni Award
- IEEE Fellow, class of 2021

2021

- HPCWire "People to Watch"

2020

- ERC Consolidator Grant
- BenchCouncil Rising Star Award

2019

- ACM Gordon Bell Prize
- IEEE TCSC Award for Excellence in Scalable Computing (MCR)

2015

- Latsis Prize of ETH Zürich
- ERC Starting Grant

2014

- Young Alumni Award, Indiana University School of Informatics

2013

- IEEE TCSC Young Achievers in Scalable Computing
- IBM Faculty Award

2012

- SIAM SIAG/SC Junior Scientist Prize
