= ACM/IEEE Supercomputing Conference =

Annual event in America established 1988

SC, The International Conference for High Performance Computing Networking, Storage, and Analysis
- Status: Active
- Genre: High Performance Computing
- Frequency: Annual
- Years active: 38
- Founder: George Michael
- Previous event: SC25 Website
- Next event: SC26 Website
- Sponsors: ACM SIGHPC and IEEE Computer Society
- Website: SC Conference Series

SC (formerly Supercomputing), the International Conference for High Performance Computing, Networking, Storage and Analysis, is the annual conference established in 1988 by the Association for Computing Machinery and the IEEE Computer Society. In 2019, about 13,950 people participated overall but in 2022 attendance had dropped to 11,830 both in-person and online. The not-for-profit conference is run by a committee of approximately 600 volunteers who spend roughly three years organizing each conference.

== Sponsorship and Governance ==
SC is sponsored by the Association for Computing Machinery and the IEEE Computer Society. From its formation through 2011, ACM sponsorship was managed through ACM's Special Interest Group on Computer Architecture (SIGARCH). Sponsors are listed on each proceedings page in the ACM DL; see for example. Beginning in 2012, ACM began the process of transitioning sponsorship from SIGARCH to the recently formed Special Interest Group on High Performance Computing (SIGHPC). This transition was completed after SC15, and for SC16 ACM sponsorship was vested exclusively in SIGHPC (IEEE sponsorship remained unchanged). The conference is non-profit.

The conference is governed by a steering committee that includes representatives of the sponsoring societies, the current conference general chair, the general chairs of the preceding two years, the general chairs of the next two conference years, and a number of elected members. All steering committee members are volunteers, with the exception of the two representatives of the sponsoring societies, who are employees of those societies. The committee selects the conference general chair, approves each year's conference budget, and is responsible for setting policy and strategy for the conference.

== Conference Components ==
Although each conference committee introduces slight variations on the program each year, the core components of the conference remain largely unchanged from year to year.

=== Technical Program ===
The SC Technical Program is competitive with an acceptance rate around 20% for papers (see History). Traditionally, the program includes invited talks, panels, research papers, tutorials, workshops, posters, and Birds of a Feather (BoF) sessions.

=== Awards ===
Each year, SC hosts the following conference and sponsoring society awards:

- ACM Gordon Bell Prize
- ACM/IEEE-CS George Michael Memorial HPC Fellowship
- ACM/IEEE-CS Ken Kennedy Award
- ACM SIGHPC Computational & Data Science Fellowships
- ACM SIGHPC Outstanding Doctoral Dissertation Award
- ACM SIGHPC Emerging Woman Leader in Technical Computing Award
- IEEE-CS Seymour Cray Computer Engineering Award
- IEEE-CS Sidney Fernbach Memorial Award
- IEEE CS TCHPC Award for Excellence for Early Career Researchers in HPC
- Test of Time Award

=== Exhibits ===
In addition to the technical program, SC hosts a research exhibition each year that includes universities, state-sponsored computing research organizations (such as the Federal labs in the US), and vendors of HPC-related hardware and software from many countries around the world. There were 353 exhibitors at SC16 in Salt Lake City, UT.

=== Student Program ===
SC's program for students has gone through a variety of changes and emphases over the years. Beginning with SC15 the program is called "Students@SC", and is oriented toward undergraduate and graduate students in computing related fields, and computing-oriented students in science and engineering. The program includes professional development programs, opportunities to learn from mentors, and engagement with SC's technical sessions.

=== SCinet ===
SCinet is SC's research network. Started in 1991, SCinet features emerging technologies for very high bandwidth, low latency wide area network communications in addition to operational services necessary to provide conference attendees with connectivity to the commodity Internet and to many national research and engineering networks.

== Name changes ==
Since its establishment in 1988, and until 1995, the full name of the conference was the "ACM/IEEE Supercomputing Conference" (sometimes: "ACM/IEEE Conference on Supercomputing"). The conference's abbreviated (and more commonly used) formal name was "Supercomputing 'XY", where XY denotes the last two digits of the year. In 1996, according to the archived front matter of the conference proceedings, the full name was changed to the ACM/IEEE "International Conference on High Performance Computing and Communications". The latter document further announced that, as of 1997, the conference will undergo a name change and will be called "SC97: High Performance Networking and Computing". The document explained that

1997 [will mark] the first use of "SC97" as the name of the annual conference you've known as "Supercomputing 'XY". This change reflects our growing attention to networking, distributed computing, data-intensive applications, and other emerging technologies that push the frontiers of communications and computing.

— SC97 Call for Participation, included in the archived front matter of Supercomputing '96.

A 1997 HPC Wire article discussed at length the reasoning, considerations, and concerns that accompanied the decision to change the name of the conference series from "Supercomputing 'XY" to "SC 'XY", stating that

It's official: the age of supercomputing has ended. At any rate, the word "supercomputing" has been excised from the title of the annual trade shows, sponsored by the IEEE and ACM, that have been known for almost ten years as "Supercomputing '(final two digits of year)". The next event, to be held in San Jose next November, has been redesignated "SC '97." Like Lewis Carroll's Cheshire Cat, "supercomputing" has faded steadily away until only the smile, nose, and whiskers remain. ... The loss is a real one. An enormous range of ordinary people had some idea, however vague, what "supercomputing" meant. No-caf, local alternatives like "SC" and "HPC" lack this authority. This is not a trivial issue. In these days of rapid change, passing technofancies, and information overload, a rose with the wrong name is just another thorn -- or forgotten immediately. After all, how can businessmen, ordinary consumers, and taxpayers be expected to pay money for something they can't comprehend? More important, will investors and grant-givers hand over money to support further R&D on something whose only identity is an arbitrary clump of capital letters?

— Norris Parker Smith. HPC Wire. February 7, 1997.

Despite these concerns, the abbreviated name of the conference, "SC", is still used today, a reminiscent of the abbreviation of the conference's original name—"Supercomputing Conference".

The full name, in contrast, underwent several changes. Between 1997 and 2003, the name "High Performance Networking and Computing" was specified in the front matter of the archived conference proceedings in some years (1997, 1998, 2000, 2002), whereas in other years it was omitted altogether in favor of the abbreviated name (1999, 2001, 2003). In 2004, the stated front matter full name was changed to "High Performance Computing, Networking and Storage Conference". In 2005, this name was replaced by the original name of the conference—"supercomputing"— in the front matter. Finally, in 2006, the current full name, as used today, emerged: "The International Conference for High Performance Computing, Networking, Storage and Analysis".

Despite all of the name variances in the proceedings through the years, the digital library of ACM, the co-sponsoring society, records the name of the conference as "The ACM/IEEE Conference on Supercomputing" from 1998 - 2008, when it changes to ""The International Conference for High Performance Computing, Networking, Storage and Analysis". It is these two names that are used in the full citations to the conference proceedings provided in this article.

== History ==
The table below provides the location, name of the general chair, and acceptance statistics for each year of SC. Note that references for data in these tables apply to data preceding the reference to the left on the same row; for example, for SC17 the single reference substantiates all the information in that row, but for SC05 the source for the convention center and chair is different than the source for the acceptance statistics.

Originally slated to be held in Atlanta, GA, SC20 was converted to a fully virtual conference due to the COVID-19 pandemic; the conference agenda spread across two weeks instead of the typical one week for an in-person conference. Over 7,440 attendees participated from 115 countries. SC21 was held as a hybrid conference with both in-person attendance in St. Louis, MO, and virtual attendance options available.

				Peer reviewed paper measures		
Year	Location	Conference center	Chair	Accepted	Submitted	Percentage (%)
1988	Orlando, Florida	Orange County Convention Center	George Michael			40%
1989	Reno, Nevada	Reno-Sparks Convention Center	Ron Bailey			
1990	New York, New York	New York Hilton Midtown	Joanne Martin			
1991	Albuquerque, New Mexico	Albuquerque Convention Center	Ray Elliott	83	215	39%
1992	Minneapolis, Minnesota	Minneapolis Convention Center	Bill Buzbee	75	220	34%
1993	Portland, Oregon	Oregon Convention Center	Bob Borchers	72	300	24%
1994	Washington, D.C.	Washington D.C. Convention Center	Gary Johnson			
1995	San Diego, California	San Diego Convention Center	Sid Karin	69	241	29%
1996	Pittsburgh, Pennsylvania	David L. Lawrence Convention Center	Beverly Clayton			
1997	San Jose, California	San Jose Convention Center	Dona Crawford	57		
1998	Orlando, Florida	Orange County Convention Center	Dennis Duke			
1999	Portland, Oregon	Oregon Convention Center	Cherri Pancake			
2000	Dallas, Texas	Dallas Convention Center	Louis Turcotte	62	179	35%
2001	Denver, Colorado	Colorado Convention Center	Charles Slocomb	60	240	25%
2002	Baltimore, Maryland	Baltimore Convention Center	Roscoe Giles	67	230	29%
2003	Phoenix, Arizona	Phoenix Civic Plaza Convention Center	James R. McGraw	60	207	29%
2004	Pittsburgh, Pennsylvania	David L. Lawrence Convention Center	Jeffrey C. Huskamp	60	200	30%
2005	Seattle, Washington	Washington State Convention Center	William Kramer	62	260	24%
2006	Tampa, Florida	Tampa Convention Center	Barbara Horner-Miller	54	239	23%
2007	Reno, Nevada	Reno-Sparks Convention Center	Becky Verastegui	54	268	20%
2008	Austin, Texas	Austin Convention Center	Pat Teller	59	277	21%
2009	Portland, Oregon	Oregon Convention Center	Wilf Pinfold	59	261	23%
2010	New Orleans, Louisiana	New Orleans Morial Convention Center	Barry Hess	51	253	20%
2011	Seattle, Washington	Washington State Convention Center	Scott Lathrop	74	352	21%
2012	Salt Lake City, Utah	Salt Palace Convention Center	Jeff Hollingsworth	100	461	22%
2013	Denver, Colorado	Colorado Convention Center	William Gropp	91	449	20%
2014	New Orleans, Louisiana	New Orleans Morial Convention Center	Trish Damkroger	83	394	21%
2015	Austin, Texas	Austin Convention Center	Jackie Kern	79	358	22%
2016	Salt Lake City, Utah	Salt Palace Convention Center	John West	81	446	18.3%
2017	Denver, Colorado	Colorado Convention Center	Bernd Mohr	61	327	18.7%
2018	Dallas, Texas	Kay Bailey Hutchison Convention Center	Ralph McEldowney	68	288	24%
2019	Denver, Colorado	Colorado Convention Center	Michela Taufer	87	339	25%
2020	Planned: Atlanta, Georgia Actual: Virtual	Georgia World Congress Center	Christine E. Cuicchi	95	378	25.1%
2021	St. Louis, Missouri	America's Center	Bronis de Supinski	98	379	25.9%
2022	Dallas, Texas	Kay Bailey Hutchison Convention Center	Candace Culhane	81	320	25.3%
2023	Denver, Colorado	Colorado Convention Center	Dorian C. Arnold	90	376	23.9%
2024	Atlanta, Georgia	Georgia World Congress Center	Philip C. Roth	99	470	21.1%
2025	St. Louis, Missouri	America's Center	Lori Diachin	136	623	21.8%
2026	Chicago, Illinois	McCormick Place	Kevin Hayden	149	769	19.4%
2027	Denver, Colorado		Kathryn Mohror			

=== Keynote speakers ===
The following table details the keynote speakers during the history of the conference; as of SC23, 16.7% of the keynote speakers have been female, with a mix of speakers from corporate, academic, and national government organizations.

Conference	Keynote Speaker	Gender	Affiliation	Job Title	Presentation Title
SC88	Seymour Cray	Male	Cray Research	Founder	What's this about Gallium Arsenide?
SC89	John Rollwagon	Male	Cray Research	CEO	Supercomputing – A Look Into the Future
SC90	Danny Hillis	Male	Thinking Machines Corporation	Founder	The Fastest Computers
SC91	Allan Bromley	Male	Office of Science and Technology Policy	Chair	The President's Initiative in HPCC
SC92	Larry Smarr	Male	NCSA	Director	Grand Challenges! Voyages of Discovery in the 1990s
SC93	Neal Lane	Male	National Science Foundation	Director	HPCC and the NII
SC94	Ed McCracken	Male	SGI	CEO	Making the NII Real
SC95	William A. Wulf	Male	University of Virginia	Professor	And Now For Some "Really" Super Computing
SC96	Frances Allen	Female	IBM	IBM Fellow	Scaling Up
SC97	Paul Saffo	Male	Institute for the Future	Director	Is Digital Dead?
SC98	Bran Ferren	Male	Walt Disney Imagineering	President of R&D	There's No Bits Like Show Bits
SC99	Donna Shirley	Female	NASA	Mars Exploration Program manager	Managing Creativity in Technical Projects
SC00	Steve Wallach	Male	CenterPoint Ventures	Advisor	Petaflops in the year 2009
SC01	Craig Venter	Male	Celera Genomics	Founder	Accelerating Discovery through Supercomputing
SC02	Rita Colwell	Female	National Science Foundation	Director	Computing: Getting us on the Path to Wisdom
SC03	Donna Cox	Female	NCSA	Professor	Beyond Computing: The Search for Creativity
SC04	Tom West	Male	National LambdaRail	CEO	NLR: Providing the Nationwide Network Infrastructure for Network and "Big Science" Research
SC05	Bill Gates	Male	Microsoft	CEO	The Changing Role of IT in the Sciences
SC06	Ray Kurzweil	Male		Inventor	The Coming Merger of Biological and Non-Biological Intelligence
SC07	Neil Gershenfeld	Male	MIT	Professor	Programming Bits and Atoms
SC08	Michael Dell	Male	Dell	Founder and CEO	Higher Performance: Supercomputing in the Connected Era
SC09	Al Gore	Male	US Government	Former Vice President of the United States	Building Solutions: Energy, Climate and Computing for a Changing World
SC10	Clayton M. Christensen	Male	Harvard Business School	Professor	How to Create New Growth in a Risk-Minimizing Environment
SC11	Jen-Hsun Huang	Male	NVIDIA	CEO	Exascale: An Innovator's Dilemma
SC12	Michio Kaku	Male	City University of New York	Professor	Physics of the Future
SC13	Genevieve Bell	Female	Intel	Intel Fellow	The Secret Life of Data
SC14	Brian Greene	Male	Columbia University	Professor	The Quest for Nature's Deepest Laws
SC15	Alan Alda	Male	Actor		Getting Beyond a Blind Date with Science: Communicating Science for Scientists
SC16	Katharine Frase	Female	IBM (Retired)	Chief Technology Officer of Public Sector	Cognitive Computing: How can we accelerate human decision making, creativity and innovation using techniques from Watson and beyond?
SC17	Philip Diamond	Male	Square Kilometre Array (SKA) project	Director General	Life, the Universe and Computing: The Story of the SKA Telescope
SC18	Erik Brynjolfsson	Male	MIT Initiative on the Digital Economy	Director	How to Deploy the Unruly Power of Machine, Platform, and Crowd
SC19	Steven Squyres	Male	Cornell University	Professor	Exploring the Solar System with the Power of Technology
SC20	Bjorn Stevens	Male	Max-Planck-Institute for Meteorology	Department Head/Professor	Climate Science in the Age of Exascale
SC21	Vint Cerf	Male	Google	Vice President	Computing and the Humanities
SC22	Jack Dongarra	Male	University of Tennessee	Distinguished Professor	ACM A.M. Turing Award Lecture: A Not So Simple Matter of Software
SC23	Hakeem Oluseyi	Male	Self	Inspirational Speaker	A Quantum Life: My Unlikely Journey from the Street to the Stars
SC24	Dr. Nicola ("Nicky") Fox	Female	NASA Science Mission Directorate	Associate Administrator	NASA's Vision for High Impact Science and Exploration
SC25	Thomas Koulopoulos	Male	Self	Futurist, Author	Gigatrends: The Exponential Forces Shaping Our Digital Future
SC26	Anima Anandkumar	Female	Caltech	Professor	The Next Scaling Law after LLMs: AI that Understands the Physical World

== See also ==
- Gordon Bell Prize
- Sidney Fernbach Award
- Seymour Cray Award
- Ken Kennedy Award
- TOP500
- Green500
- HPC Challenge Awards
- SCinet
