= George Michael (disambiguation) =

George Michael (1963–2016) was an English singer, songwriter, and record producer.

George Michael may also refer to:

- George Michael (computational physicist) (1926–2008), computational physicist
- George Michael (academic) (born 1961), political scientist
- George Michael (sportscaster) (1939–2009), American radio disk jockey, and TV host
- George Michael Bluth, a fictional character on the sitcom Arrested Development
- George Michael Gaethke (1898–1982), American visual artist

== See also ==
- Michael George (disambiguation)
- George M. Michaels (1910–1992) American politician
- Georges Michel (disambiguation)
