= Taufer =

Taufer is a surname. Notable people with the surname include:

- Mel Taufer (born 1998), Ethiopian-born Italian footballer
- Michela Taufer (born 1971), Italian American computer scientist
- Veno Taufer (1933–2023), Slovenian poet, essayist, translator, and playwright
