= Testing high-performance computing applications =

High-performance computing applications run on massively parallel supercomputers consist of concurrent programs designed using multi-threaded, multi-process models. The applications may consist of various constructs (threads, local processes, distributed processes, etc.) with varying degree of parallelism. Although high performance concurrent programs use similar design patterns, models and principles as that of sequential programs, unlike sequential programs, they typically demonstrate non-deterministic behavior. The probability of bugs increases with the number of interactions between the various parallel constructs. Race conditions, data races, deadlocks, missed signals and live lock are common error types.

== Challenges ==
Parallel programs can be divided into two general categories: explicitly and implicitly parallel. Using parallel language constructs defined for process creation, communication and synchronization make an application explicitly parallel. Using a tool or parallelizing compiler to convert a serial program into a parallel one, makes it implicitly parallel. Both categories are equally bug-prone.

=== Heisenbugs ===
Concurrent applications should execute correctly on every possible thread schedule in the underlying operating system. However, traditional testing methods detect few bugs, chiefly because of the Heisenbugs problem. A Heisenbug is an error that changes or disappears when an attempt is made to isolate and probe them via debugger, by adding some constructs such as synchronization requests or delay statements.

=== Non-repeatability ===
Another issue is caused due to the unpredictable behavior of the scheduler. Differences in system load influence scheduler behavior. This behavior cannot be changed manually. To counter this indeterminism, the program must be executed many times under various execution environments. Still, it is not guaranteed that a bug can be reproduced. Most of the time, the program runs correctly, and the bug is visible only when specific conditions are matched. As a result, non-repeatability of the concurrent programs is a major source of roadblock for detecting error. As an example, consider the following.

void thread1(void *t)
{
    mutex_lock(a);
    mutex_lock(b);
    // do some work
    .
    .
    .
    mutex_unlock(b);
    mutex_unlock(a);
}

void thread2(void *t)
{
    mutex_lock(b);
    mutex_lock(a);
    // do some work
    .
    .
    .
    mutex_unlock(a);
    mutex_unlock(b);
}

Clearly, this has a problem of causing deadlocks. Yet, it may cause deadlock in some runs of the program while in others, it may run successfully.

=== Probe effect ===
Probe effect is seen in parallel programs when delay-statements are inserted in parallel programs facing synchronization problems. This effect, like Heisenbugs, alters behavior changes that may obscure problems. Detecting the source of a probe effect is a great challenge in testing parallel applications.
The main difference between Probe effect and Heisenbugs is that Heisenbugs are seen when additional delay statements and/or synchronization requests are added to the concurrent application during testing, while probe effect is seen when the developer adds delay statements to concurrent applications with poor synchronization.

== Testing strategies ==
The differences between sequential and concurrent programs lead to the differences in their testing strategies. Strategies for sequential programs can be modified to make them suitable for concurrent applications. Specialized strategies have also been developed. Conventionally, testing includes designing test cases and checking that the program produces the expected results. Thus, errors in specification, functionality, etc. are detected by running the application and subjecting it to testing methods such as functional testing, white box, black box and gray-box testing. Static analysis is also used for detecting errors in high performance software using methods such as data flow analysis, control flow analysis, cyclomatic complexities, thread escape analysis and static slicing analysis to find problems. Using static analysis before functionality testing can save time. It can detect ‘what the error is’ find the error source. Static analysis techniques can detect problems like lack of synchronization, improper synchronizations, predict occurrence of deadlocks and post-wait errors in rendezvous requests.

Details:

=== Deterministic scheduling / reproducible testing ===
The indeterminacy of scheduling has two sources.

1. Time slicing

Scheduler switches contexts at equal intervals of time. This interval depends on the speed of individual processors, memory-cache hierarchy state and system load. Even on the same processor, under the same load, the interval varies slightly due to minor variations in frequency of the system clock.

2. Page Faults

Scheduler suspends a program if a page fault occurs, letting other threads proceed while the system fetches the page. As the occurrence of page faults depends upon what other processes are running, the timing of a context switch becomes indeterminate.

To make concurrent programs repeatable, an external scheduler is used. The program under test is instrumented to add calls to this scheduler. Such calls are made at the beginning and end of each thread as well as before every synchronization request. This scheduler selectively blocks threads of execution by maintaining a semaphore associated with each thread, such that only one thread is ready for execution at any given time. Thus, it converts parallel non-deterministic application into a serial execution sequence in order to achieve repeatability. The number of scheduling decisions made by the serializing scheduler is given by –

(N * K / P)*{(N + P)!}
Where 
N = number of threads
K = potential context switch points
P = budget of pre-emptive context switches

=== Feedback-directed testing ===
To obtain more accurate results using deterministic scheduling, an alternate approach can be chosen. A few properly-placed pre-emptions in the concurrent program can detect bugs related to data races. Bugs are found in clusters. The existence of one bug establishes a high probability of more bugs in the same region of code. Thus each pass of the testing process identifies sections of code with bugs. The next pass more thoroughly scrutinizes those sections by adding scheduler calls around them. Allowing the problematic locations to execute in a different order can reveal unexpected behavior.

=== Timing-related testing ===
This strategy ensures that the application is not prone to the Probe Effect. Sources of errors that cause the Probe Effect can range from task creation issues to synchronization and communication problems. Requirements of timing related tests:

- Delay duration must vary
- Delay points must cover appropriate program locations
- Delay statements must be inserted, removed or relocated to induce Probe Effect

The number of test cases per input data set is:

nC1 + nC1 + … + nC1 = 2n -1
Where n = total number of synchronization, process creation and communication calls.

This equation has exponential order. In order to reduce the number of test cases, either Deterministic Execution Method (DET) or Multiple Execution Technique (MET) is used. Various issues must be handled:

- Delayed execution

Addition of delays is a straightforward task. A typical sleep() statement can be used to insert delays.

- Deciding where to insert delays

Insertion locations are known as delay-points. As the objective of timing related test cases is to detect synchronization, communication and thread creation errors, delay statements are added just in front of these statements.

==== Advantages ====
- Easy to implement on multiple processors without any need of ordering the synchronization requests.
- No need to generate concurrency graph
- More effective for fault detection
- Total number of test cases are less, yet code coverage is more, due to static analysis

=== All Du-Path testing ===
This method applies the concept of define-use pair, in order to determine the paths to be tested.

== Verification strategies ==
Software verification is a process that proves that software is working correctly and is performing the intended task as designed.

=== Test calculations ===
Input is given to the system to generate a known result. This input-result pair can be obtained from previous empirical results and/or manual calculations. This is a system-level test that can be performed only when all relevant modules are integrated. Moreover, it only shows that bugs exist. It offers no detailed information regarding the number of bugs, their location or nature.

=== Symmetry tests ===
These tests are primarily used for scientific simulations. The output of the simulation often cannot be predicted. Since these simulations attempt to describe scientific laws, any symmetries in the theory must be honored by the simulation. Thus, by varying input conditions along the lines of symmetry and then comparing the obtained results with externally derived results, the existence of bugs can be detected.

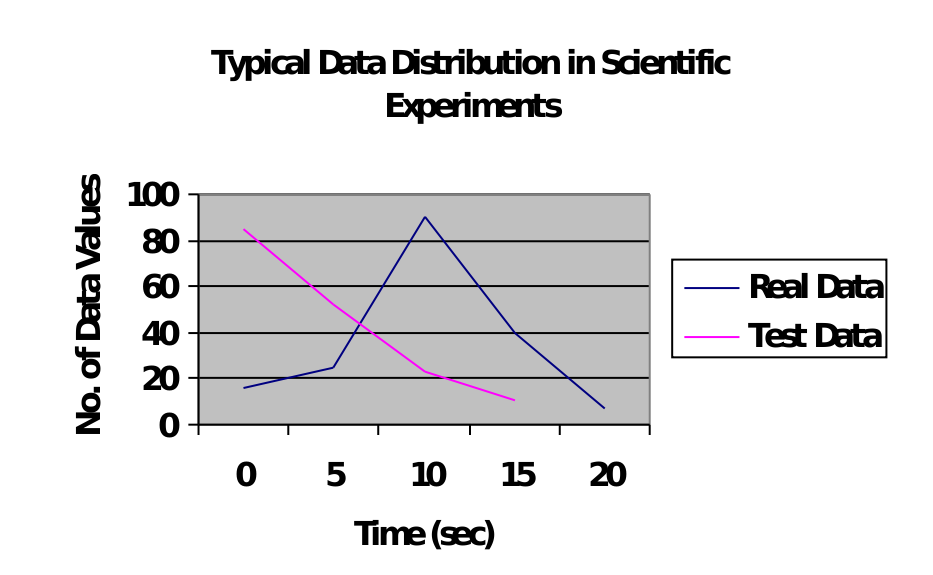
Figure 1 : Data Distribution

In scientific computing most data lies in the central region of the simulation conditions. As a result, it is difficult to perform Boundary-value testing with real time experimental data. Thus, center of simulation (for example, for data value of 10 in Figure 1) is shifted to one of the boundaries so as to test the boundary condition effectively.

=== Parallel implementation tests ===
Parallel implementation tests are usually used for applications that use distributed memory programming models such as message passing. These tests are often applied to programs that use regular grids of processors.

==== Global summation ====
Many parallel databases use distributed parallel processing to execute the queries. While executing an aggregate function such as sum, the following strategy is used:

- Compute a partial sum locally and concurrently at each processor using the data present in the associated disk partition with it.
- Add these local subtotals to get the final result.

The final result may contain some rounding error as each processor independently rounds-off local results. One test is to ensure that such errors do not occur. This requires showing that the aggregate sum is decomposition-independent. An alternate summation scheme is to send all of the individual values to one processor for summation. This result can be compared with the distributed result to ensure consistency.

== Tools ==
=== Microsoft CHESS ===
This tool eliminates non-determinacy using deterministic scheduling. It tracks schedule paths executed previously and guarantees that each time a new schedule path is executed.
