= ACM SIGHPC =

ACM's Special Interest Group on High Performance Computing

Association for Computing Machinery Special Interest Group on High Performance Computing (ACM SIGHPC)
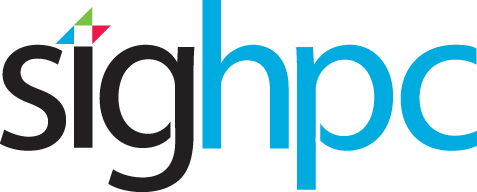
- Founded: November 1, 2011; 15 years ago
- Purpose: High Performance Computing
- Region served: International
- Website: www.sighpc.org

ACM SIGHPC is the Association for Computing Machinery's Special Interest Group on High Performance Computing, an international community of students, faculty, researchers, and practitioners working on research and in professional practice related to supercomputing, high-end computers, and cluster computing. The organization co-sponsors international conferences related to high performance and scientific computing, including: SC, the International Conference for High Performance Computing, Networking, Storage and Analysis; the Platform for Advanced Scientific Computing (PASC) Conference; Practice and Experience in Advanced Research Computing (PEARC); and PPoPP, the Symposium on Principles and Practice of Parallel Programming.

== History ==
ACM SIGHPC was founded on November 1, 2011, with the support of ACM SIGARCH. The first chair was Cherri Pancake, who was also the 1999 ACM/IEEE Supercomputing Conference chair.

During its formation, the SIG was led by a set of volunteer officers:

Transitional officers
	Officer
Chair	Cherri Pancake
Vice Chair	Jeffery K. Hollingsworth
Treasurer	Becky Verastegui

These officers were replaced by the first elected slate of officers in July 2013, with subsequent elections scheduled every three years.

Elected officers and terms
	Officer	Term
Chair	Cherri Pancake	2013-2016
Chair	Jeffery K. Hollingsworth	2016-2019
Vice Chair	Jeff Hollingsworth	2013-2016
Vice Chair	John West	2016-2019
Treasurer	Becky Verastegui	2013-2016
Treasurer	Rajeev Thakur	2016-2019
Member-at-large	Torsten Hoefler	2013-2016
Member-at-large	Rajeev Thakur	2013-2016
Member-at-large	Torsten Hoefler	2016-2019
Member-at-large	Michela Taufer	2016-2019

In addition to elected officers, the SIG is supported by a variety of appointed volunteer leaders who are responsible for membership coordination, creating the newsletter, and other duties needed to operate the SIG; the roles vary as the needs of the SIG change over time. These volunteer leaders are appointed by the SIG chair.

== Conferences ==
ACM SIGHPC co-sponsors the following international conferences related to high performance computing:

- The SC Conference, the International Conference on High Performance Computing, Networking, Storage and Analysis.
- Platform for Advanced Scientific Computing (PASC)
- Symposium on Principles and Practice of Parallel Programming PPoPP
- Practice and Experience in Advanced Research Computing (PEARC)

In addition, ACM SIGHPC supports the following conferences with in-cooperation status:

- IEEE International Parallel and Distributed Processing Symposium
- International Workshop on Runtime and Operating Systems for Supercomputers
- IEEE Cluster Conference
- EuroMPI/USA Conference

== Grants and awards ==
SIGHPC offers a variety of travel grants to support student participation in its conferences, including a program in partnership with ACM-W that focuses specifically on participation by women. SIGHPC also sponsors an Outstanding Doctoral Dissertation Award, given each year for the best doctoral dissertation completed in high performance computing. This award is open to students studying anywhere in the world who have completed a PhD dissertation with HPC as a central research theme.

The SIG also sponsors the Emerging Woman Leader in Technical Computing Award. This award is offered once every two years and recognizes a woman in high performance and technical computing during the important middle years of their career for their work in research, education, and/or practice over the five to fifteen years after completing her last academic degree.

The ACM SIGHPC Computational and Data Science Fellowships are part of a multi-year program to increase the diversity of students pursuing graduate degrees in data science and computational science. Specifically targeted at women or students from racial/ethnic backgrounds that have not traditionally participated in the computing field, the program is open to students pursuing degrees at institutions anywhere in the world. The program began in 2015 with a five-year commitment of $1.5M in funds from Intel, and continued beginning in 2020 under the sole sponsorship of the SIG. As of the announcement of the 2022 class, the fellowship has supported a total of 73 Phd and MS students.

== Chapters ==
Chapters are sub-organizations within ACM SIGs that may be organized by a geographic region or by a technical topic area. Chapter activities vary, but may include physical meetings, webinars, and workshops. SIGHPC currently supports the following chapters:

- BigData: a topic-oriented chapter devoted to the intersection of HPC and big data.
- Education: this chapter targets aspects of teaching HPC, developing educational or training materials, and curriculum development.
- SIGHPC-RCE: this chapter focuses on issues related to HPC operations in resource constrained environments (RCE).
- SYSPROS: the Systems Professionals chapter (or SYSPROS) supports the interests of systems administrators, developers, engineers, and other professionals involved or interested in the operation and support of systems for high performance computing.

== See also ==
- Computer engineering
- Computer science
- Computing
- High performance technical computing
- Massively parallel computing
- Manycore processor
- Parallel computing
- Supercomputer
