= George Michael (computational physicist) =

American computational physicist (1926–2008)

George Anthony Michael
- Born: February 16, 1926; Buffalo, New York
- Died: June 5, 2008 (age 82)
- Education: University of San Francisco
- Employer: Lawrence Livermore Laboratories

George Anthony Michael (February 16, 1926 – June 5, 2008) was an American computational physicist at Lawrence Livermore Laboratories, involved in the development of supercomputing. He was one of the founders of the annual ACM/IEEE Supercomputing Conference, first held in 1988. The George Michael Memorial Fellowship was established in his honor. George was the person primarily responsible for doing the interviews and gathering the materials for the web site: Stories of the Development of Large Scale Scientific Computing at Lawrence Livermore National Laboratory.
