= Georges Michel =

Georges Michel may refer to:

- Georges Michel (painter) (1763–1843), French painter, precursor of the Barbizon school
- Georges Michel (footballer) (1898–1928), Belgian footballer
- Michel Georges-Michel (1883–1985), French painter and writer

== See also ==
- Michel A. J. Georges (born 1959), Belgian biologist
- George Michael (disambiguation)
