= Michela Taufer =

American computer scientist

- Born: 23 April 1971 (age 55)
- Education: ETH Zurich (Swiss Federal Institute of Technology in Zürich)
- Known for: High performance computing; Volunteer computing; Data analysis; Reproducibility
- Awards: R&D100 Award in the Software/Service Category (2021); IEEE Senior Member (2020); IBM Faculty Award (2019, 2021); ACM Distinguished Member (2015)
- Scientific career
- Fields: High performance computing; Volunteer computing; Data analysis; Molecular dynamics; Computational science; Reproducibility
- Workplaces: The University of Tennessee, Knoxville
- Academic advisors: Thomas M. Stricker; Daniel A. Reed
- Website: https://globalcomputing.group/about.html

Michela Taufer (born 23 April 1971) is an Italian-American computer scientist and holds the Jack Dongarra Professorship in High Performance Computing within the Department of Electrical Engineering and Computer Science at the University of Tennessee, Knoxville. She is an ACM Distinguished Scientist and an IEEE Senior Member. In 2021, together with a team al Lawrence Livermore National Laboratory, she earned a R&D 100 Award for the Flux workload management software framework in the Software/Services category.

== Education ==
Taufer attended the University of Padua where she obtained a Laurea in Computer Engineering in 1996. She later went on to earn her Ph.D. in computer science at ETH Zurich (Swiss Federal Institute of Technology in Zürich) in 2002. The dissertation for her Ph.D. in computer science from ETH Zurich (Swiss Federal Institute of Technology in Zürich) was titled, Inverting Middleware: Performance Analysis of Layered Application Codes in High Performance Distributed Computing, and was supervised by Thomas M. Stricker and Daniel A. Reed.

== Research ==
Her current research interests include high performance computing, scientific applications, and their programmability on multi-core and many-core platforms. She applies advances in computational and algorithmic solutions for high-performance computing technologies (i.e., volunteer computing, accelerators and GPUs, and in situ analytics workflows) to multi-disciplinary fields including molecular dynamics, ecoinformatics, seismology, and biology.

== Recognition ==
In 2021, together with a team al Lawrence Livermore National Laboratory, she earned a R&D 100 Award for the Flux workload management software framework in the Software/Services category. In 2023, Taufer was elected a Fellow of the American Association for the Advancement of Science.

== See also ==
- Stefano Valore
- Silvio Micali
