= SCinet =

- Country: United States
- Inaugurated: 1990
- Most recent: 2023 (Denver)
- Next event: 2024 (Atlanta)
- Major events: SC (High Performance Computing Conference)
- Patrons: SC, The International Conference for High Performance Computing Networking, Storage, and Analysis
- Organizer: ACM SIGHPC and IEEE Computer Society
- Website: https://sc24.supercomputing.org/scinet/

SCinet is the high-performance network built annually by volunteers in support of SC (formerly Supercomputing, the International Conference for High Performance Computing, Networking, Storage and Analysis). SCinet is the primary network for the yearly conference and is used by attendees and exhibitors to demonstrate and test high-performance computing and networking applications.

== International Community ==
SCinet is also a hub for the international networking community. It provides a platform to share the latest research, technologies, and demonstrations for networks, network technology providers, and even software developers who are in charge of supporting HPC communities at their own institutions or organizations.

== Volunteers ==
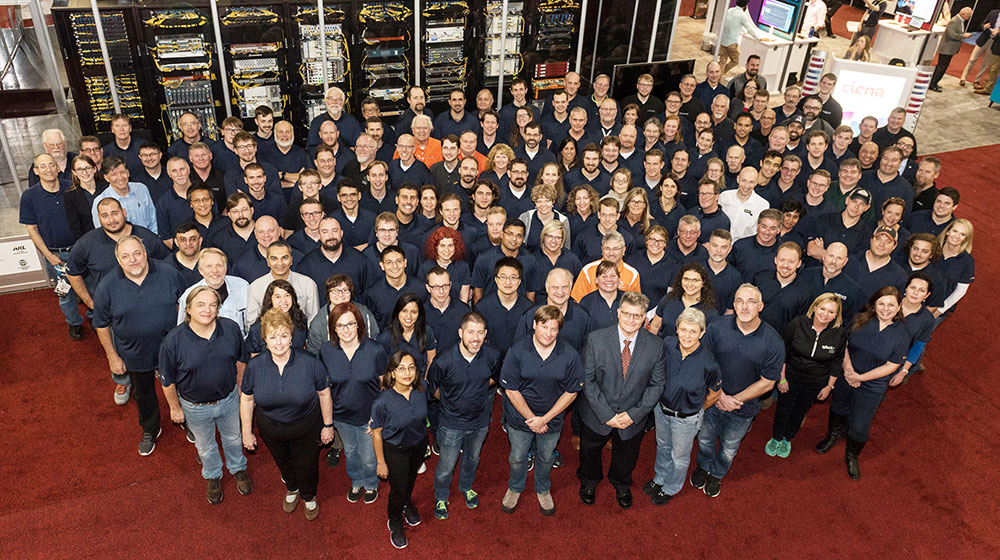
SCinet2017 volunteers

Nearly 200 volunteers from educational institutions, high performance computing sites, equipment vendors, research and education networks, government agencies and telecommunications carriers collaborate via technology and in-person to design, build and operate SCinet.

While many of these credentialed individuals have volunteered at SCinet for years, first timers join the team each year. They include international students and participants in the National Science Foundation-funded Women in IT Networking at SC (WINS) program. The 2017 SCinet team included women and men from high performance computing institutions in the U.S. and throughout the world.

== History ==
Originated in 1991 as an initiative within the SC conference to provide networking to attendees, SCinet has grown to become the "World's Fastest Network" during the duration of the conference. For 29 years, SCinet has provided SC attendees and the high performance computing (HPC) community with the innovative network platform necessary to internationally interconnect, transport, and display HPC research during SC.

Historically, SCinet has been used as a platform to test networking technology and applications which have found their way into common use.

== Research and development ==
In the past years, SCinet deployed conference wide networking technologies such as ATM, FDDI, HiPPi before they were deployed commercially.
