= Cherri M. Pancake =

Ethnographer and computer scientist

Cherri Pancake
- Born: Cherri M. Pancake
- Education: Cornell University; Louisiana State University; Auburn University (PhD)
- Awards: ACM Fellow (2001)
- Scientific career
- Workplaces: Oregon State University; Ixchel Museum of Indigenous Textiles and Clothing
- Thesis: PROFILE : a model for generating source-level execution analyzers (1986)
- Website: engineering.oregonstate.edu/people/cherri-pancake

Cherri M. Pancake is an ethnographer and computer scientist who works as a professor of electrical engineering and computer science and Intel Faculty Fellow at Oregon State University, and as the director of the Northwest Alliance for Computational Science & Engineering. She is known for her pioneering work on usability engineering for high performance computing. In 2018 she was elected for a two-year term as president of the Association for Computing Machinery.

== Education ==
Pancake earned a bachelor's degree in environmental design from Cornell University, and then studied anthropology at Louisiana State University. After working for the Peace Corps in Peru, she spent ten years in Guatemala studying the Maya peoples; for over six of these years she was curator of the Ixchel Museum of Indigenous Textiles and Clothing. However, the political unrest in Guatemala in the early 1980s caused her to return to the US, where she became a graduate student in engineering at Auburn University, the first woman in the program. She received a PhD in Computer Engineering in 1986.

== Career and research ==
For 10 years, Pancake split her time between her university appointment (first at Auburn, then at Oregon State) and an appointment as visiting scientist at the Cornell Theory Center. She performed the first usability studies of software tools for high performance computing, and found methods of improving the usability of these tools based on her knowledge of color perception, response time, short-term memory, and programming errors.

For over two decades, Pancake has been active with the ACM/IEEE SC (Supercomputing) Conference, serving as general chair of SC99 and in numerous other positions. She founded the Parallel Tools Consortium in 1993 and led several software standards efforts. In 2011, she founded SIGHPC and served as its chair until 2016, when she was elected vice-president of the Association for Computing Machinery and then president in 2018. Working with Intel Corporation leaders, she established the ACM SIGHPC/Intel Computational & Data Science Fellowships to increase diversity in the computing field.

=== Awards and honors ===
Pancake was elected a fellow of the Association for Computing Machinery in 2001 "for leadership contributions to usability to high performance computing tools", and became a Fellow of the Institute of Electrical and Electronics Engineers in 2003. She was honored as one of the Oregon Women of Achievement in 2006.
