= Lori Diachin =

American computer scientist

Lori Ann Diachin (formerly Lori Ann Freitag) is an American computer scientist specializing in scientific computing, mesh generation, mesh improvement, and interoperability. She works in the Computation Directorate of the Lawrence Livermore National Laboratory, where she is Deputy Associate Director for Science and Technology, and Deputy Director of the Exascale Computing Project.

== Education and career ==
Freitag's father was a professor, specializing in mathematics education. She majored in mathematics at Edinboro University of Pennsylvania, graduating in 1988, and did graduate study in applied mathematics and numerical analysis at the University of Virginia, completing her Ph.D. there in 1992. Her dissertation, Parallel Solution of the Generalized Helmholtz Equation on Distributed Memory Architectures, was supervised by James McDonough Ortega.

She became a researcher at the Argonne National Laboratory, working there on the CAVE virtual-reality environment. She also worked as a researcher at the Sandia National Laboratory, before moving to the Lawrence Livermore National Laboratory in 2003.

== Recognition ==
Diachin was one of the 1997 winners of the Presidential Early Career Award for Scientists and Engineers.
