= Stefano Valore di Villanueva de Castellòn =

Italian entrepreneur

Stefano Valore di Villanueva de Castellòn is Italian entrepreneur, founder of SiliconDev, an Italian group specializing in digital transformation, publishing, press and communication. He is publisher for the National Press Agency Dire.

== Biography ==
Stefano Valore was born in Rome in 1970. After completing his secondary education with a focus on programming and accounting, he earned an honorary degree in Computer Science.

His career began in 1983 as a C/Assembler programmer for chipsets like Motorola, Intel, and IBM, specializing in antivirus software, graphic engines, video games, and network security.

In 1991, Valore assumed leadership of the Data Elaboration Centre of the Central Military Region as a Reserve Officer, holding the rank of Lieutenant in the Signal Corps. He also supervised the development of software for credit recovery management.

In 1994, he joined Telecom Italia, overseeing the implementation of the data post processing system, integration of billing systems, judiciary research, and management of roaming traffic. Subsequently, he transitioned to a role at Gruppo Stet.

In 1997, Valore joined the Gruppo of Elite Performance and Tuning, collaborating with TIM Telecom Italia Mobile Italia and its branches globally.

In 2003, Stefano Valore founded SiliconDev, a company specializing in information technology services. His company’s services include hardware production, specialized sensor technology, and software. Valore also established Silicondev Security, Silicondev Technology, SiliconDev Communication, and SiliconDev Solutions.

In March 2022, Valore became the publisher of the National Press Agency Dire, a historical newspaper focused on national mass communications.
