= Supercomputer =

Type of computer with high performance

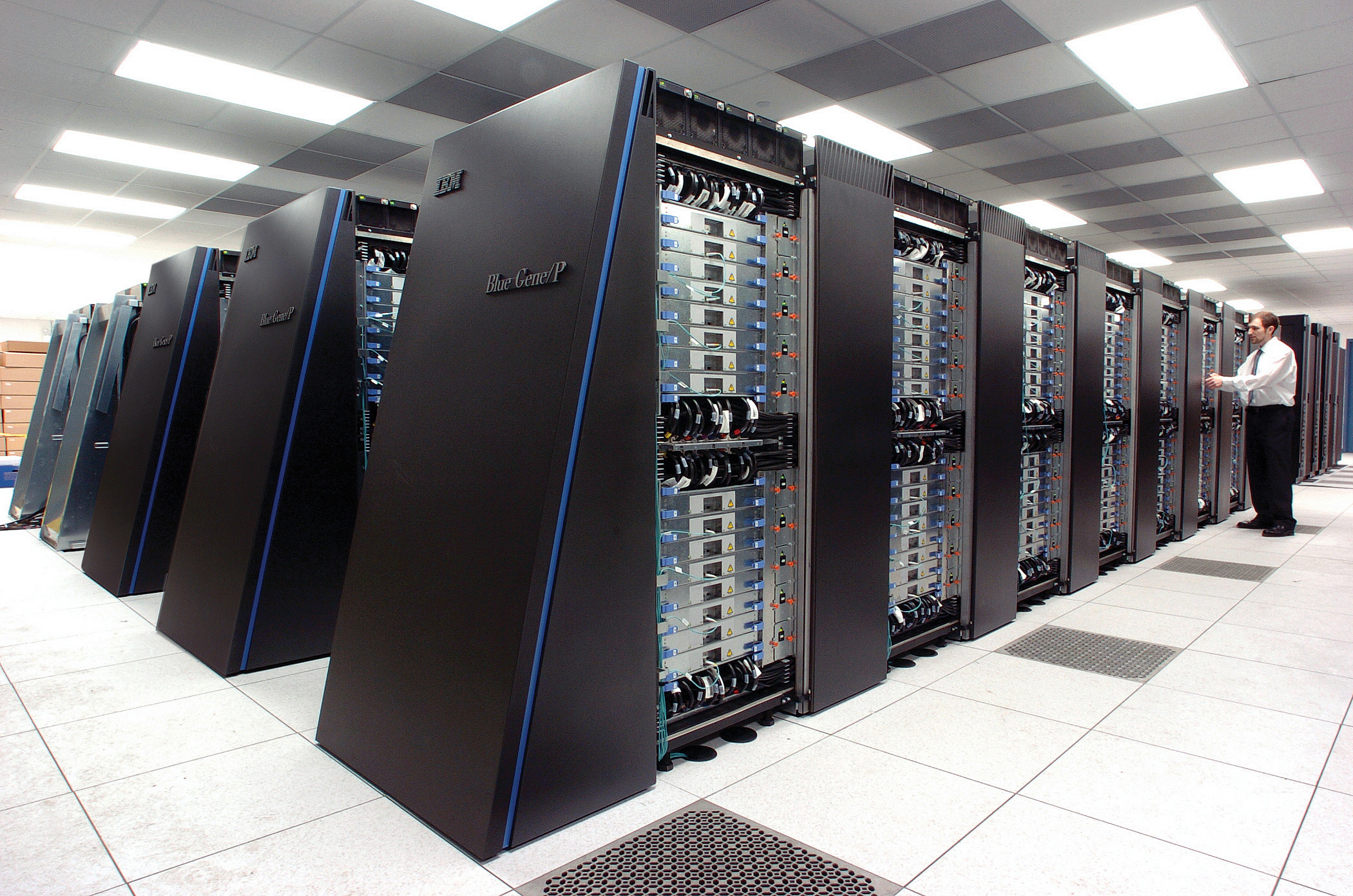
The Blue Gene/P supercomputer "Intrepid" at Argonne National Laboratory (pictured 2007) runs 164,000 processor cores using normal data center air conditioning, grouped in 40 racks/cabinets connected by a high-speed 3D torus network.

A supercomputer is a type of computer with a high level of performance as compared to a general-purpose computer. Supercomputers play an important role in the field of computational science, and are used for a wide range of computationally intensive tasks in various fields including quantum mechanics, weather forecasting, climate research, oil and gas exploration, molecular modeling (computing the structures and properties of chemical compounds, biological macromolecules, polymers, and crystals), and physical simulations (such as simulations of aerodynamics, of the early moments of the universe, and of nuclear weapons). They have been essential in the field of cryptanalysis.

The performance of a supercomputer is commonly measured in floating-point operations per second (FLOPS) instead of million instructions per second (MIPS). Since 2022, exascale supercomputers have existed which can perform over 10^{18} FLOPS. For comparison, a desktop computer has performance in the range of hundreds of gigaFLOPS (10^{11}) to tens of teraFLOPS (10^{13}). Since November 2017, all of the world's fastest 500 supercomputers run on Linux-based operating systems. Additional research is being conducted in the United States, the European Union, Taiwan, Japan, and China to build faster, more powerful and technologically superior exascale supercomputers.

Supercomputers were introduced in the 1960s, and for several decades the fastest was made by Seymour Cray at Control Data Corporation (CDC), Cray Research and subsequent companies bearing his name or monogram. The first such machines were highly tuned conventional designs that ran quicker than their more general-purpose contemporaries. Through the decade, increasing amounts of parallelism were added, with one to four processors being typical. In the 1970s, vector processors operating on large arrays of data came to dominate. A notable example is the highly successful Cray-1 of 1976. Vector computers remained the dominant design into the 1990s. From then until today, massively parallel supercomputers with tens of thousands of off-the-shelf processors became the norm.

The U.S. has long been a leader in the supercomputer field, initially through Cray's nearly uninterrupted dominance and later through a variety of technology companies. Japan made significant advancements in the field during the 1980s and 1990s, while China has become increasingly active in supercomputing in recent years. As of June 2026, LineShine of the National Supercomputing Center in Shenzhen is the world's fastest supercomputer. The US has four of the top 10; Italy two, Japan, Germany, Switzerland and China have one each.

== History ==
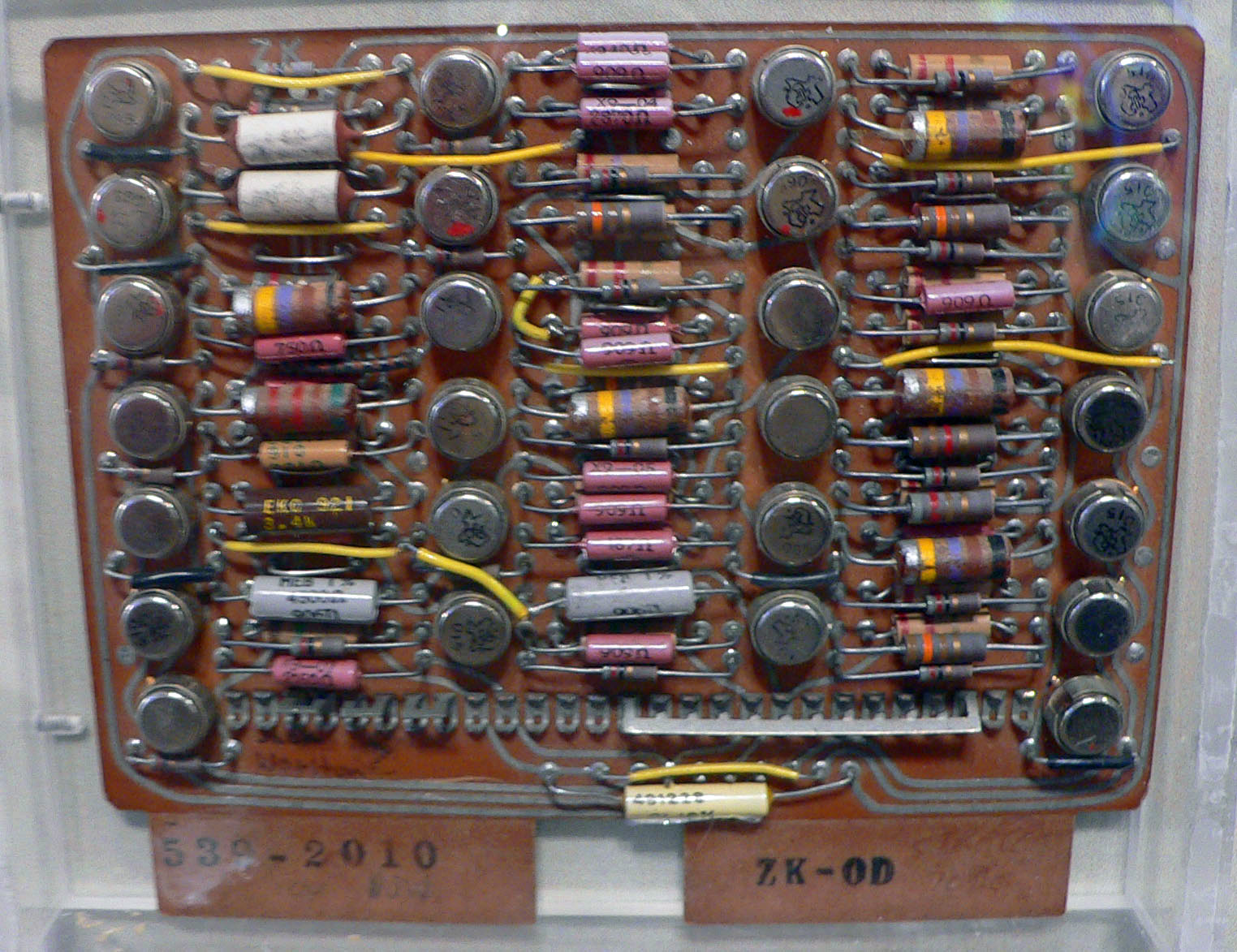
A circuit board from the IBM 7030

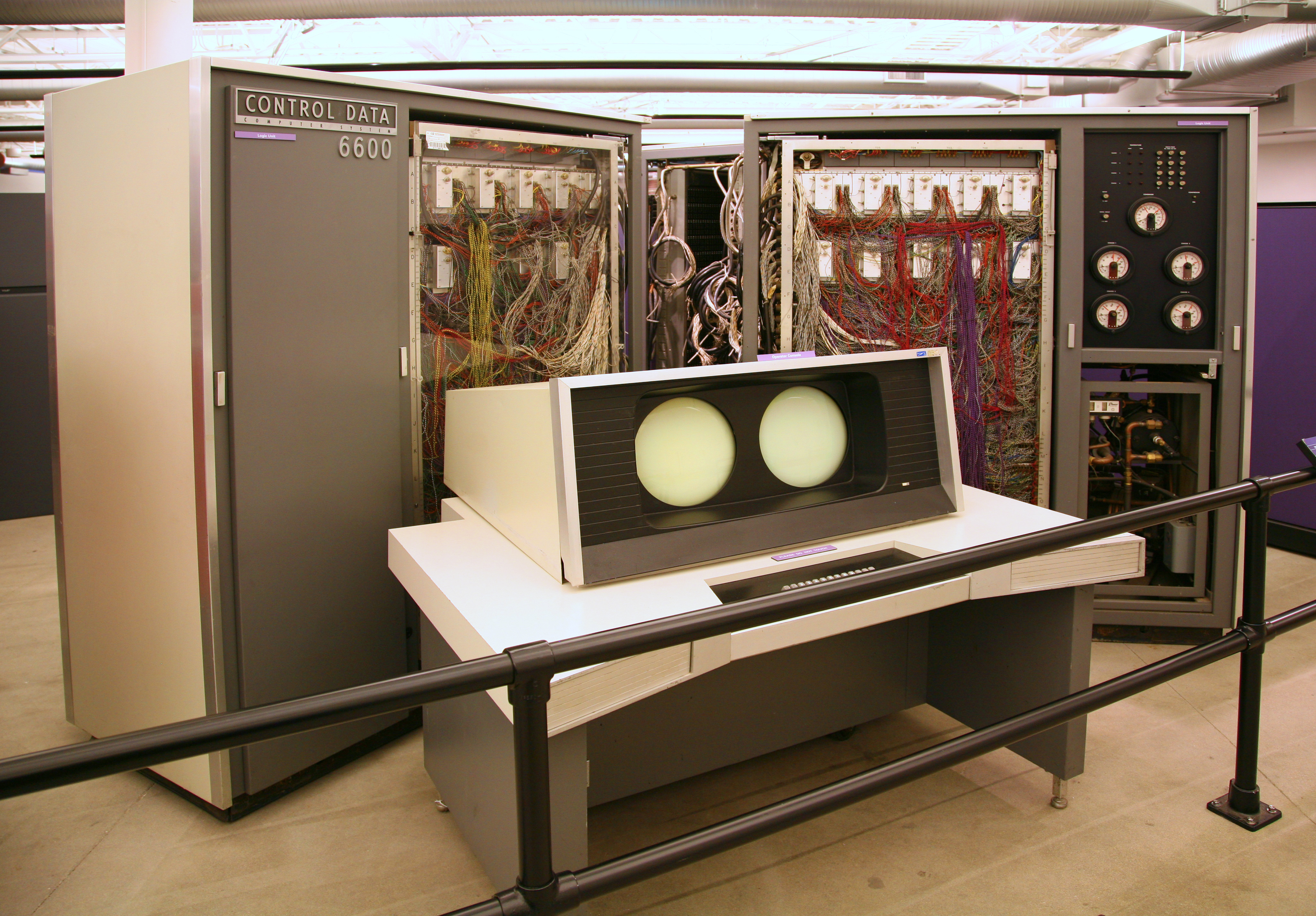
The CDC 6600. Behind the system console are two of the "arms" of the plus-sign shaped cabinet with the covers opened. Each arm of the machine had up to four such racks. On the right is the cooling system.

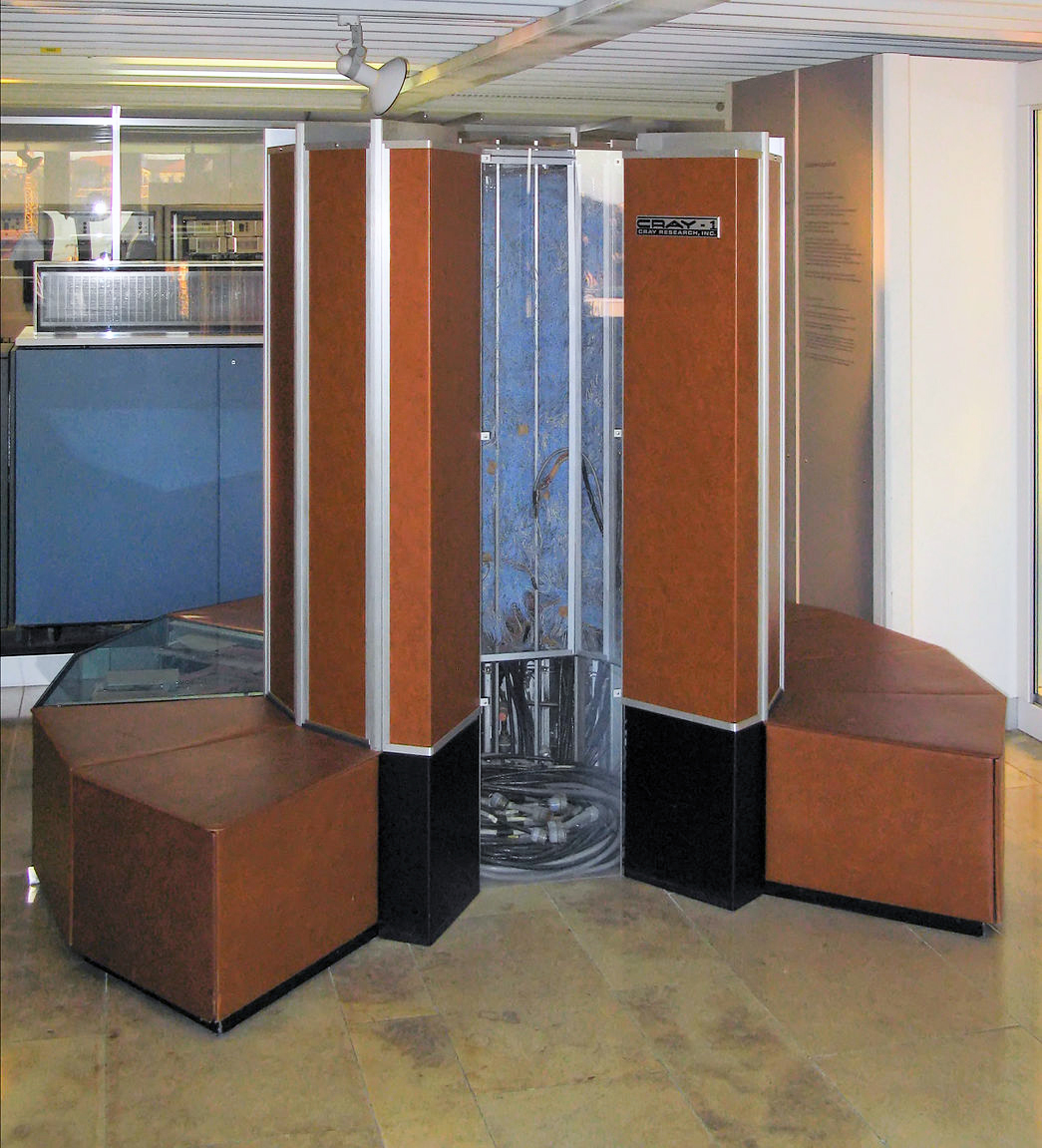
A Cray-1 preserved at the Deutsches Museum

In 1960, UNIVAC built the Livermore Atomic Research Computer (LARC), today considered among the first supercomputers, for the US Navy Research and Development Center. It still used high-speed drum memory, rather than the newly emerging disk drive technology. Also, among the first supercomputers was the IBM 7030 Stretch. The IBM 7030 was built by IBM for the Los Alamos National Laboratory, which then in 1955 had requested a computer 100 times faster than any existing computer. The IBM 7030 used transistors, magnetic core memory, pipelined instructions, prefetched data through a memory controller and included pioneering random access disk drives. The IBM 7030 was completed in 1961 and despite not meeting the challenge of a hundredfold increase in performance, it was purchased by the Los Alamos National Laboratory. Customers in England and France also bought the computer, and it became the basis for the IBM 7950 Harvest, a supercomputer built for cryptanalysis.

The third pioneering supercomputer project in the early 1960s was the Atlas at the University of Manchester, built by a team led by Tom Kilburn. He designed the Atlas to have memory space for up to a million words of 48 bits, but because magnetic storage with such a capacity was unaffordable, the actual core memory of the Atlas was only 16,000 words, with a drum providing memory for a further 96,000 words. The Atlas Supervisor swapped data in the form of pages between the magnetic core and the drum. The Atlas operating system also introduced time-sharing to supercomputing, so that more than one program could be executed on the supercomputer at any one time. Atlas was a joint venture between Ferranti and Manchester University and was designed to operate at processing speeds approaching one microsecond per instruction, about one million instructions per second.

The CDC 6600, designed by Seymour Cray, was finished in 1964 and marked the transition from germanium to silicon transistors. Silicon transistors could run more quickly and the overheating problem was solved by introducing refrigeration to the supercomputer design. Thus, the CDC6600 became the fastest computer in the world. Given that the 6600 outperformed all the other contemporary computers by about 10 times, it was dubbed a supercomputer and defined the supercomputing market, when one hundred computers were sold at $8 million each.

Cray left CDC in 1972 to form his own company, Cray Research. Four years after leaving CDC, Cray delivered the 80 MHz Cray-1 in 1976, which became one of the most successful supercomputers in history. The Cray-2 was released in 1985. It had eight central processing units (CPUs), liquid cooling and the electronics coolant liquid Fluorinert was pumped through the supercomputer architecture. It reached 1.9 gigaFLOPS, making it the first supercomputer to break the gigaflop barrier.

=== Massively parallel designs ===
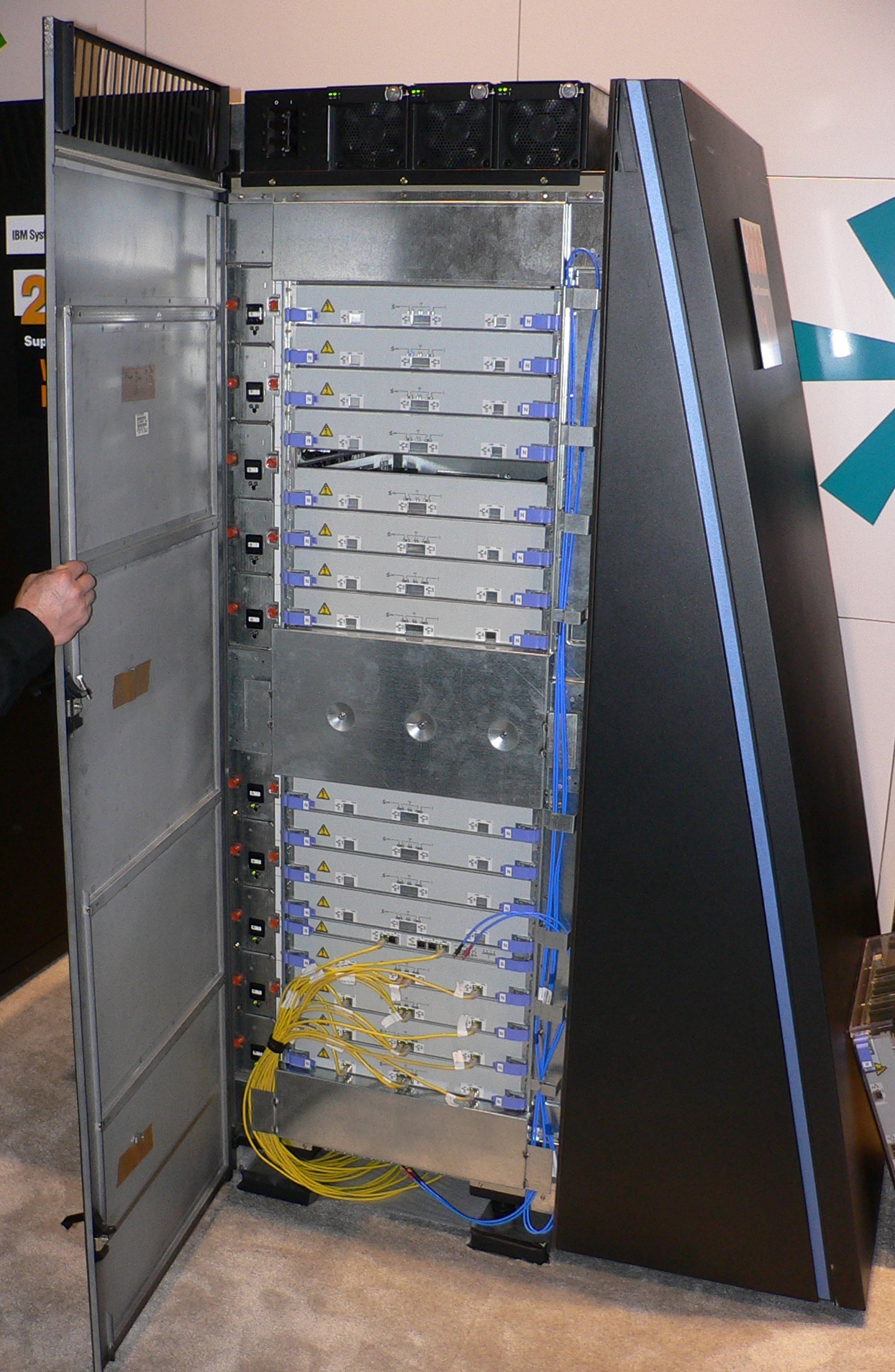
A cabinet of the massively parallel Blue Gene/L, showing the stacked blades, each holding many processors

The only computer to seriously challenge the Cray-1's performance in the 1970s was the ILLIAC IV. This machine was the first realized example of a true massively parallel computer, in which many processors worked together to solve different parts of a single larger problem. In contrast with the vector systems, which were designed to run a single stream of data as quickly as possible, in this concept, the computer instead feeds separate parts of the data to entirely different processors and then recombines the results. The ILLIAC's design was finalized in 1966 with 256 processors and offer speed up to 1 GFLOPS, compared to the 1970s Cray-1's peak of 250 MFLOPS. However, development problems led to only 64 processors being built, and the system could never operate more quickly than about 200 MFLOPS while being much larger and more complex than the Cray. Another problem was that writing software for the system was difficult, and getting peak performance from it was a matter of serious effort.

But the partial success of the ILLIAC IV was widely seen as pointing the way to the future of supercomputing. Cray argued against this, famously quipping that "If you were plowing a field, which would you rather use? Two strong oxen or 1024 chickens?" But by the early 1980s, several teams were working on parallel designs with thousands of processors, notably the Connection Machine (CM) that developed from research at MIT. The CM-1 used as many as 65,536 simplified custom microprocessors connected together in a network to share data. Several updated versions followed; the CM-5 supercomputer is a massively parallel processing computer capable of many billions of arithmetic operations per second.

In 1982, Osaka University's LINKS-1 Computer Graphics System used a massively parallel processing architecture, with 514 microprocessors, including 257 Zilog Z8001 control processors and 257 iAPX 86/20 floating-point processors. It was mainly used for rendering realistic 3D computer graphics. Fujitsu's VPP500 from 1992 is unusual since, to achieve higher speeds, its processors used GaAs, a material normally reserved for microwave applications due to its toxicity. Fujitsu's Numerical Wind Tunnel supercomputer used 166 vector processors to gain the top spot in 1994 with a peak speed of 1.7 gigaFLOPS (GFLOPS) per processor. The Hitachi SR2201 obtained a peak performance of 600 GFLOPS in 1996 by using 2048 processors connected via a fast three-dimensional crossbar network. The Intel Paragon could have 1000 to 4000 Intel i860 processors in various configurations and was ranked the fastest in the world in 1993. The Paragon was a MIMD machine which connected processors via a high speed two-dimensional mesh, allowing processes to execute on separate nodes, communicating via the Message Passing Interface.

Software development remained a problem, but the CM series sparked off considerable research into this issue. Similar designs using custom hardware were made by many companies, including the Evans & Sutherland ES-1, MasPar, nCUBE, Intel iPSC and the Goodyear MPP. But by the mid-1990s, general-purpose CPU performance had improved so much in that a supercomputer could be built using them as the individual processing units, instead of using custom chips. By the turn of the 21st century, designs featuring tens of thousands of commodity CPUs were the norm, with later machines adding graphic units to the mix.

In 1998, David Bader developed the first Linux supercomputer using commodity parts. While at the University of New Mexico, Bader sought to build a supercomputer running Linux using consumer off-the-shelf parts and a high-speed low-latency interconnection network. The prototype utilized an Alta Technologies "AltaCluster" of eight dual, 333 MHz, Intel Pentium II computers running a modified Linux kernel. Bader ported a significant amount of software to provide Linux support for necessary components as well as code from members of the National Computational Science Alliance (NCSA) to ensure interoperability, as none of it had been run on Linux previously. Using the successful prototype design, he led the development of "RoadRunner," the first Linux supercomputer for open use by the national science and engineering community via the National Science Foundation's National Technology Grid. RoadRunner was put into production use in April 1999. At the time of its deployment, it was considered one of the 100 fastest supercomputers in the world. Though Linux-based clusters using consumer-grade parts, such as Beowulf, existed prior to the development of Bader's prototype and RoadRunner, they lacked the scalability, bandwidth, and parallel computing capabilities to be considered "true" supercomputers.

The CPU share of TOP500

Diagram of a three-dimensional torus interconnect used by systems such as Blue Gene, Cray XT3, etc.

Systems with a massive number of processors generally take one of two paths. In the grid computing approach, the processing power of many computers, organized as distributed, diverse administrative domains, is opportunistically used whenever a computer is available. In another approach, many processors are used in proximity to each other, e.g. in a computer cluster. In such a centralized massively parallel system the speed and flexibility of the interconnect becomes very important and modern supercomputers have used various approaches ranging from enhanced Infiniband systems to three-dimensional torus interconnects. The use of multi-core processors combined with centralization is an emerging direction, e.g. as in the Cyclops64 system.

As the price, performance and energy efficiency of general-purpose graphics processing units (GPGPUs) have improved, a number of petaFLOPS supercomputers such as Tianhe-I and Nebulae have started to rely on them. However, other systems such as the K computer continue to use conventional processors such as SPARC-based designs and the overall applicability of GPGPUs in general-purpose high-performance computing applications has been the subject of debate, in that while a GPGPU may be tuned to score well on specific benchmarks, its overall applicability to everyday algorithms may be limited unless significant effort is spent to tune the application to it. However, GPUs are gaining ground, and in 2012 the Jaguar supercomputer was transformed into Titan by retrofitting CPUs with GPUs.

High-performance computers have an expected life cycle of about three years before requiring an upgrade. The Gyoukou supercomputer is unique in that it uses both a massively parallel design and liquid immersion cooling.

== Special purpose supercomputers ==
A number of special-purpose systems have been designed, dedicated to a single problem. This allows the use of specially programmed FPGA chips or even custom ASICs, allowing better price/performance ratios by sacrificing generality. Examples of special-purpose supercomputers include Belle, Deep Blue, and Hydra for playing chess, Gravity Pipe for astrophysics, MDGRAPE-3 for protein structure prediction and molecular dynamics, and Deep Crack for breaking the DES cipher.

== Energy usage and heat management ==
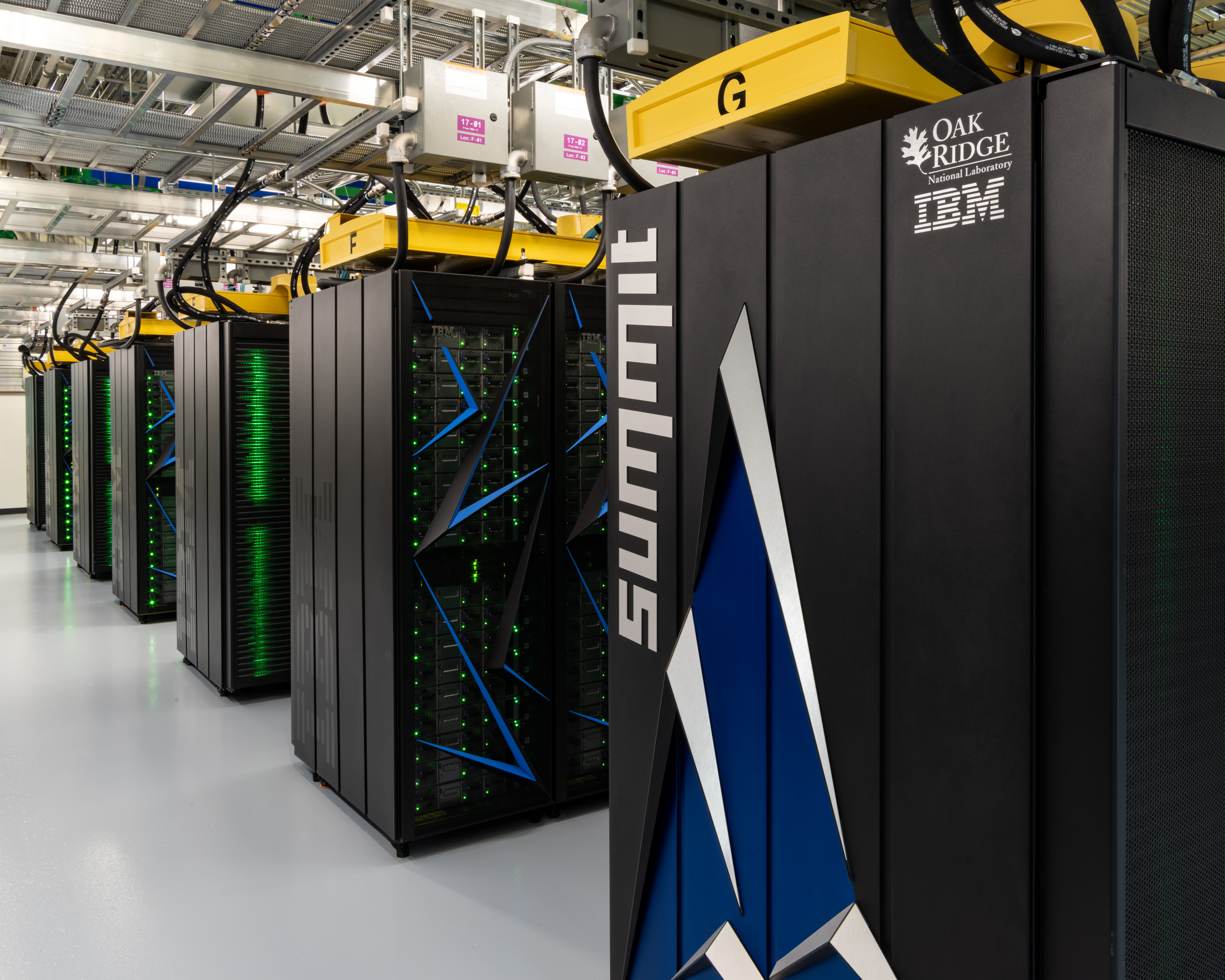
The Summit supercomputer was as of November 2018 the fastest supercomputer in the world. With a measured power efficiency of 14.668 GFlops/watt it is also the third most energy efficient in the world.

Throughout the decades, the management of heat density has remained a key issue for most centralized supercomputers. The large amount of heat generated by a system may also have other effects, e.g. reducing the lifetime of other system components. There have been diverse approaches to heat management, from pumping Fluorinert through the system, to a hybrid liquid-air cooling system or air cooling with normal air conditioning temperatures. A typical supercomputer consumes large amounts of electrical power, almost all of which is converted into heat, requiring cooling. For example, Tianhe-1A consumes 4.04 megawatts (MW) of electricity. The cost to power and cool the system can be significant, e.g. 4 MW at $0.10/kWh is $400 an hour or about $3.5 million per year.

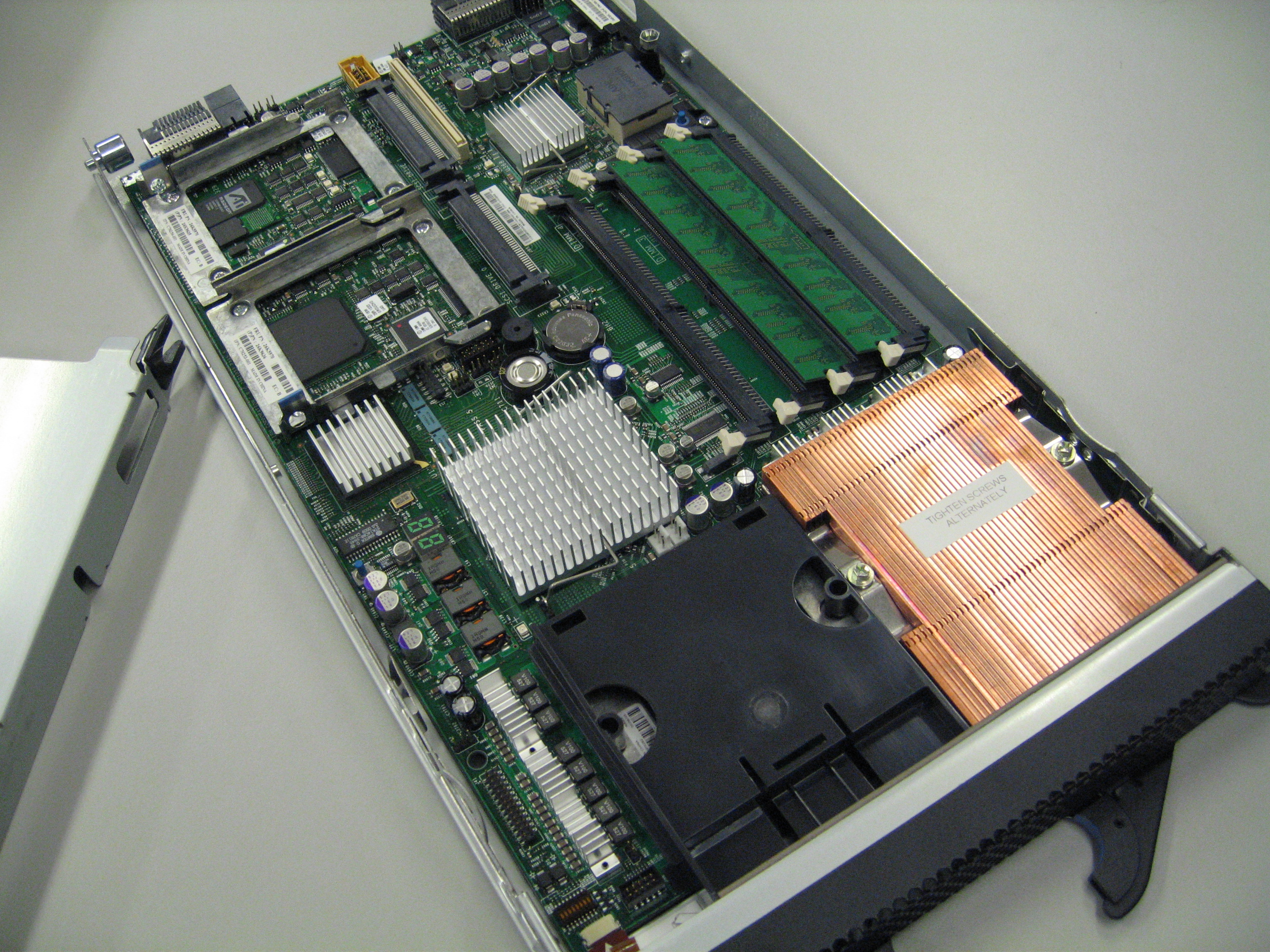
An IBM HS20 blade

Heat management is a major issue in complex electronic devices and affects powerful computer systems in various ways. The thermal design power and CPU power dissipation issues in supercomputing surpass those of traditional computer cooling technologies. The supercomputing awards for green computing reflect this issue.

The packing of thousands of processors together inevitably generates significant amounts of heat density that need to be dealt with. The Cray-2 was liquid cooled, and used a Fluorinert "cooling waterfall" which was forced through the modules under pressure. However, the submerged liquid cooling approach was not practical for the multi-cabinet systems based on off-the-shelf processors, and in System X a special cooling system that combined air conditioning with liquid cooling was developed in conjunction with the Liebert company.

In the Blue Gene system, IBM deliberately used low power processors to deal with heat density. The IBM Power 775, released in 2011, has closely packed elements that require water cooling. The IBM Aquasar system uses hot water cooling to achieve energy efficiency, the water being used to heat buildings as well.

The energy efficiency of computer systems is generally measured in terms of "FLOPS per watt". In 2008, Roadrunner by IBM operated at 376 MFLOPS/W. In November 2010, the Blue Gene/Q reached 1684 MFLOPS/W and in June 2011 the top two spots on the Green 500 list were occupied by Blue Gene machines in New York (one achieving 2097 MFLOPS/W) with the DEGIMA cluster in Nagasaki placing third with 1375 MFLOPS/W.

Because copper wires can transfer energy into a supercomputer with much higher power densities than forced air or circulating refrigerants can remove waste heat, the ability of the cooling systems to remove waste heat is a limiting factor. As of 2015, many existing supercomputers have more infrastructure capacity than the actual peak demand of the machine – designers generally conservatively design the power and cooling infrastructure to handle more than the theoretical peak electrical power consumed by the supercomputer. Designs for future supercomputers are power-limited – the thermal design power of the supercomputer as a whole, the amount that the power and cooling infrastructure can handle, is somewhat more than the expected normal power consumption, but less than the theoretical peak power consumption of the electronic hardware.

== Software and system management ==
=== Operating systems ===
Since the end of the 20th century, supercomputer operating systems have undergone major transformations, based on the changes in supercomputer architecture. While early operating systems were custom tailored to each supercomputer to gain speed, the trend has been to move away from in-house operating systems to the adaptation of generic software such as Linux.

Since modern massively parallel supercomputers typically separate computations from other services by using multiple types of nodes, they usually run different operating systems on different nodes, e.g. using a small and efficient lightweight kernel such as CNK or CNL on compute nodes, but a larger system such as a full Linux distribution on server and I/O nodes.

While in a traditional multi-user computer system job scheduling is, in fact a tasking problem for processing and peripheral resources, in a massively parallel system, the job management system must additionally manage the allocation of computational and communication resources and account for hardware failures that can occur in systems with tens of thousands of processors.

Although most modern supercomputers use Linux-based operating systems, each manufacturer has its own specific Linux distribution, and no industry standard exists, partly due to the fact that the differences in hardware architectures require changes to optimize the operating system to each hardware design.

=== Software tools and message passing ===
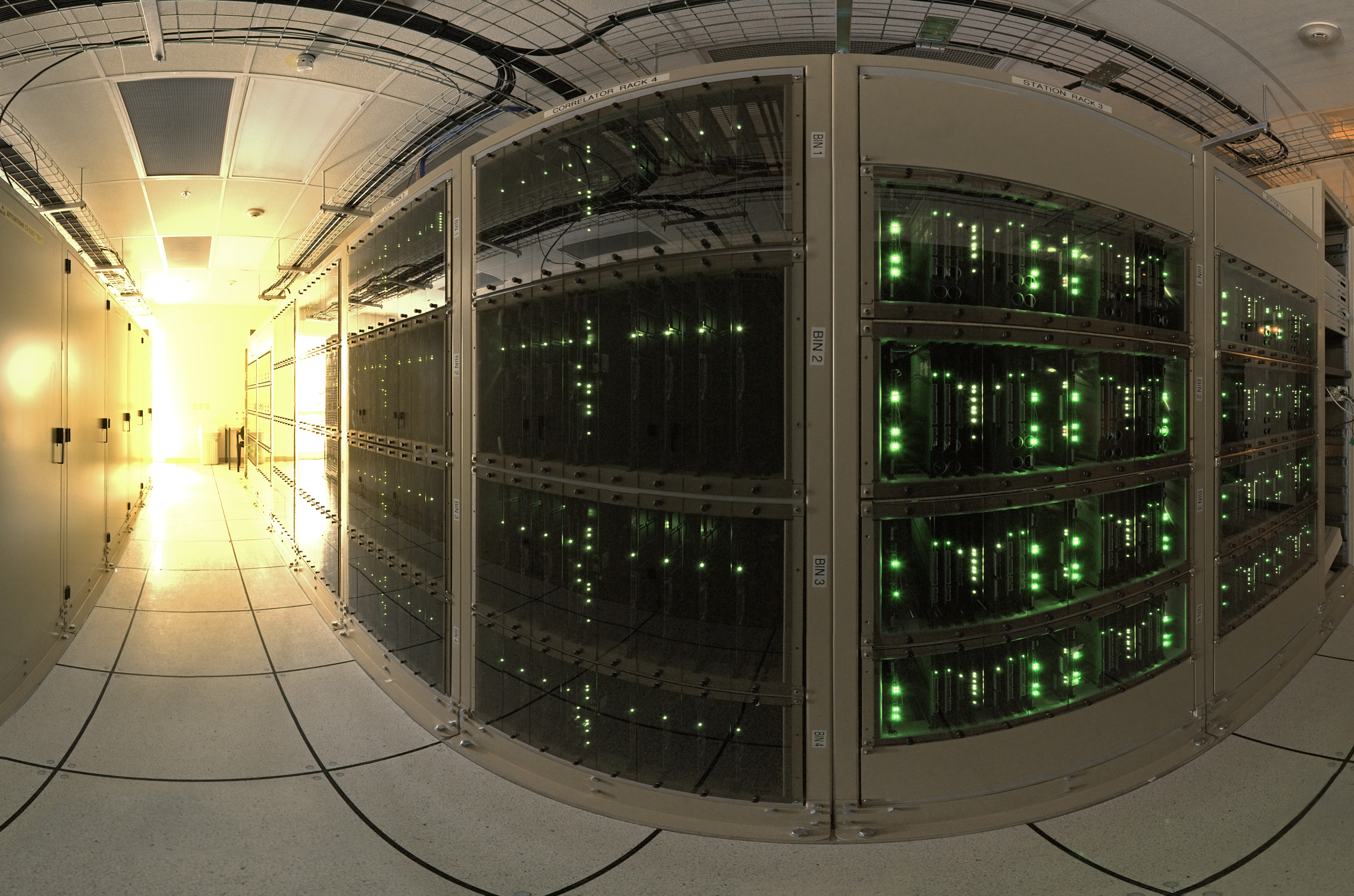
Wide-angle view of the ALMA correlator

The parallel architectures of supercomputers often dictate the use of special programming techniques to exploit their speed. Software tools for distributed processing include standard APIs such as MPI and PVM, VTL, and open source software such as Beowulf.

In the most common scenario, environments such as PVM and MPI for loosely connected clusters and OpenMP for tightly coordinated shared memory machines are used. Significant effort is required to optimize an algorithm for the interconnect characteristics of the machine it will be run on; the aim is to prevent any of the CPUs from wasting time waiting on data from other nodes. GPGPUs have hundreds of processor cores and are programmed using programming models such as CUDA or OpenCL.

Moreover, it is quite difficult to debug and test parallel programs. Special techniques need to be used for testing and debugging such applications.

== Distributed supercomputing ==
=== Opportunistic approaches ===
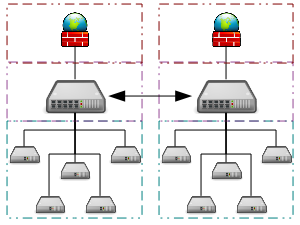
Example architecture of a grid computing system connecting many personal computers over the internet

Opportunistic supercomputing is a form of networked grid computing whereby a "super virtual computer" of many loosely coupled volunteer computing machines performs very large computing tasks. Grid computing has been applied to a number of large-scale embarrassingly parallel problems that require supercomputing performance scales. However, basic grid and cloud computing approaches that rely on volunteer computing cannot handle traditional supercomputing tasks such as fluid dynamic simulations.

The fastest grid computing system is the volunteer computing project Folding@home (F@h). As of April 2020, F@h reported 2.5 exaFLOPS of x86 processing power. Of this, over 100 PFLOPS are contributed by clients running on various GPUs, and the rest from various CPU systems.

The Berkeley Open Infrastructure for Network Computing (BOINC) platform hosts a number of volunteer computing projects. As of February 2017, BOINC recorded a processing power of over 166 petaFLOPS through over 762 thousand active Computers (Hosts) on the network.

As of October 2016, Great Internet Mersenne Prime Search's (GIMPS) distributed Mersenne Prime search achieved about 0.313 PFLOPS through over 1.3 million computers. The PrimeNet server has supported GIMPS's grid computing approach, one of the earliest volunteer computing projects, since 1997.

=== Quasi-opportunistic approaches ===
Quasi-opportunistic supercomputing is a form of distributed computing whereby the "super virtual computer" of many networked geographically disperse computers performs computing tasks that demand huge processing power. Quasi-opportunistic supercomputing aims to provide a higher quality of service than opportunistic grid computing by achieving more control over the assignment of tasks to distributed resources and the use of intelligence about the availability and reliability of individual systems within the supercomputing network. However, quasi-opportunistic distributed execution of demanding parallel computing software in grids should be achieved through the implementation of grid-wise allocation agreements, co-allocation subsystems, communication topology-aware allocation mechanisms, fault tolerant message passing libraries and data pre-conditioning.

== High-performance computing clouds ==
Cloud computing with its recent and rapid expansions and development have grabbed the attention of high-performance computing (HPC) users and developers in recent years. Cloud computing attempts to provide HPC-as-a-service exactly like other forms of services available in the cloud such as software as a service, platform as a service, and infrastructure as a service. HPC users may benefit from the cloud in different angles such as scalability, resources being on-demand, fast, and inexpensive. On the other hand, moving HPC applications have a set of challenges too. Good examples of such challenges are virtualization overhead in the cloud, multi-tenancy of resources, and network latency issues. Much research is currently being done to overcome these challenges and make HPC in the cloud a more realistic possibility.

In 2016, Penguin Computing, Parallel Works, R-HPC, Amazon Web Services, Univa, Silicon Graphics International, Rescale, Sabalcore, and Gomput started to offer HPC cloud computing. The Penguin On Demand (POD) cloud is a bare-metal compute model to execute code, but each user is given virtualized login node. POD computing nodes are connected via non-virtualized 10 Gbit/s Ethernet or QDR InfiniBand networks. User connectivity to the POD data center ranges from 50 Mbit/s to 1 Gbit/s. Citing Amazon's EC2 Elastic Compute Cloud, Penguin Computing argues that virtualization of compute nodes is not suitable for HPC. Penguin Computing has also criticized that HPC clouds may have allocated computing nodes to customers that are far apart, causing latency that impairs performance for some HPC applications.

== Performance measurement ==
=== Capability versus capacity ===
Supercomputers generally aim for the maximum in capability computing rather than capacity computing. Capability computing is typically thought of as using the maximum computing power to solve a single large problem in the shortest amount of time. Often a capability system is able to solve a problem of a size or complexity that no other computer can, e.g. a very complex weather simulation application.

Capacity computing, in contrast, is typically thought of as using efficient cost-effective computing power to solve a few somewhat large problems or many small problems. Architectures that lend themselves to supporting many users for routine everyday tasks may have a lot of capacity but are not typically considered supercomputers, given that they do not solve a single very complex problem.

=== Performance metrics ===
Top supercomputer speeds: logscale speed over 60 years

In general, the speed of supercomputers is measured and benchmarked in FLOPS (floating-point operations per second), and not in terms of MIPS (million instructions per second), as is the case with general-purpose computers. These measurements are commonly used with an SI prefix such as tera-, combined into the shorthand TFLOPS (10^{12} FLOPS, pronounced teraflops), or peta-, combined into the shorthand PFLOPS (10^{15} FLOPS, pronounced petaflops.) Petascale supercomputers can process one quadrillion (10^{15}) (1000 trillion) FLOPS. Exascale is computing performance in the exaFLOPS (EFLOPS) range. An EFLOPS is one quintillion (10^{18}) FLOPS (one million TFLOPS). However, the performance of a supercomputer can be severely impacted by fluctuation brought on by elements like system load, network traffic, and concurrent processes, as mentioned by Brehm and Bruhwiler (2015).

No single number can reflect the overall performance of a computer system, yet the goal of the Linpack benchmark is to approximate how fast the computer solves numerical problems and it is widely used in the industry. The FLOPS measurement is either quoted based on the theoretical floating point performance of a processor (derived from manufacturer's processor specifications and shown as "Rpeak" in the TOP500 lists), which is generally unachievable when running real workloads, or the achievable throughput, derived from the LINPACK benchmarks and shown as "Rmax" in the TOP500 list. The LINPACK benchmark typically performs LU decomposition of a large matrix. The LINPACK performance gives some indication of performance for some real-world problems, but does not necessarily match the processing requirements of many other supercomputer workloads, which for example may require more memory bandwidth, or may require better integer computing performance, or may need a high performance I/O system to achieve high levels of performance.

=== The TOP500 list ===
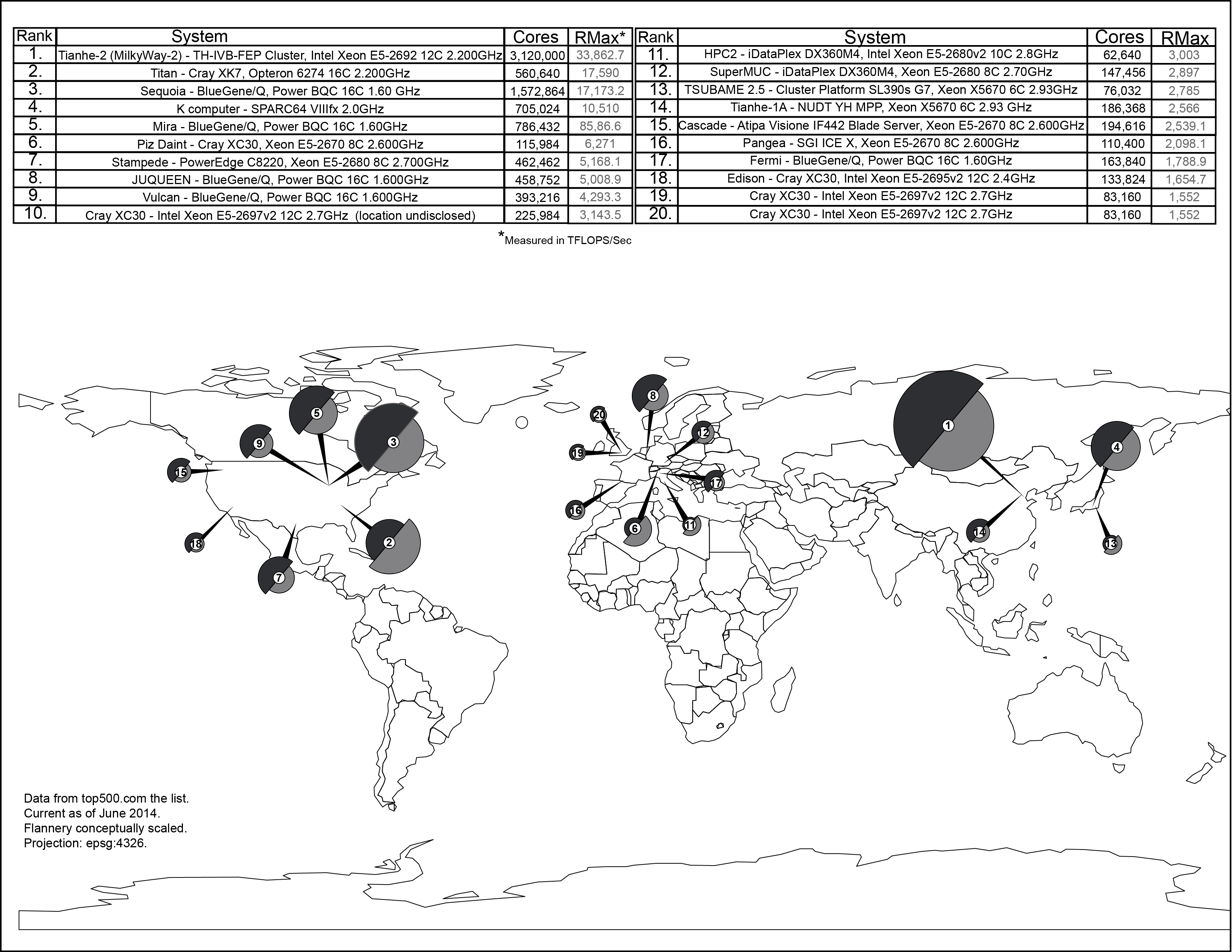
Top 20 supercomputers in the world (June 2014)

Since 1993, the fastest supercomputers have been ranked on the TOP500 list according to their LINPACK benchmark results. The list does not claim to be unbiased or definitive, but it is a widely cited current definition of the "fastest" supercomputer available at any given time.

This is a list of the computers which appeared at the top of the TOP500 list since June 1993, and the "Peak speed" is given as the "Rmax" rating. In 2018, Lenovo became the world's largest provider for the TOP500 supercomputers with 117 units produced.

Top 10 positions of the 67th TOP500 in June 2026
| Rank (previous) | Rmax Rpeak^{(PetaFLOPS)} | Name | Model | CPU cores | Accelerator (e.g. GPU) cores | Total cores (CPUs + accelerators) | Interconnect | Manufacturer | Site country | Year | Operating system |
|---|---|---|---|---|---|---|---|---|---|---|---|
| 1 | 2,198.40; 2,735.82 | LineShine | LingKun | 13,789,440 (45,360 × 304-core Huawei LX2-ARMv9 @1.55 GHz) | - | 13,789,440 | LingQi | Shenzhen Cloud Computing Center | National Supercomputing Centre in Shenzhen (NSCS); China | 2025 | Linux (Kylin OS) |
| 2 ▼ | 1,809.00; 2,821.10 | El Capitan | HPE Cray EX255a | 1,080,000 (45,000 × 24-core Optimized 4th Generation EPYC 24C @1.8 GHz) | 10,260,000 (45,000 × 228 AMD Instinct MI300A) | 11,340,000 | Slingshot-11 | HPE | Lawrence Livermore National Laboratory; United States | 2024 | Linux (TOSS) |
| 3 ▼ | 1,353.00; 2,055.72 | Frontier | HPE Cray EX235a | 614,656 (9,604 × 64-core Optimized 3rd Generation EPYC 64C @2.0 GHz) | 8,451,520 (38,416 × 220 AMD Instinct MI250X) | 9,066,176 | Slingshot-11 | HPE | Oak Ridge National Laboratory; United States | 2022 | Linux (HPE Cray OS) |
| 4 ▼ | 1,012.00; 1,980.01 | Aurora | HPE Cray EX | 1,104,896 (21,248 × 52-core Intel Xeon Max 9470 @2.4 GHz) | 8,159,232 (63,744 × 128 Intel Max 1550) | 9,264,128 | Slingshot-11 | HPE | Argonne National Laboratory; United States | 2023 | Linux (SUSE Linux Enterprise Server 15 SP4) |
| 5 ▼ | 1,000.00; 1,226.28 | JUPITER | BullSequana XH3000 | 1,694,592 (23,536 × 72-Arm Neoverse V2 cores Nvidia Grace @3 GHz) | 3,106,752 (23,536 × 132 Nvidia Hopper H100) | 4,801,344 | Quad-rail NVIDIA NDR200 Infiniband | Atos | EuroHPC JU; European Union, Jülich, Germany | 2025 | Linux (RHEL) |
| 6 | 571.50; 861.13 | HPC7 | HPE Cray EX255a | 329,664 (13,736 × 24-core Optimized 4th Generation EPYC 24C @1.8 GHz) | 3,131,808 (13,736 × 228 AMD Instinct MI300A) | 3,461,472 | Slingshot-11 | HPE | Eni S.p.A; European Union, Ferrera Erbognone, Italy | 2026 | Linux (RHEL 9.0) |
| 7 ▼ | 561.20; 846.84 | Eagle | Microsoft NDv5 | 172,800 (3,600 × 48-core Intel Xeon Platinum 8480C @2.0 GHz) | 1,900,800 (14,400 × 132 Nvidia Hopper H100) | 2,073,600 | NVIDIA Infiniband NDR | Microsoft | Microsoft; United States | 2023 | Linux (Ubuntu 22.04 LTS) |
| 8 ▼ | 477.90; 606.97 | HPC6 | HPE Cray EX235a | 213,120 (3,330 × 64-core Optimized 3rd Generation EPYC 64C @2.0 GHz) | 2,930,400 (13,320 × 220 AMD Instinct MI250X) | 3,143,520 | Slingshot-11 | HPE | Eni S.p.A; European Union, Ferrera Erbognone, Italy | 2024 | Linux (RHEL 8.9) |
| 9 ▼ | 442.01; 537.21 | Fugaku | Supercomputer Fugaku | 7,630,848 (158,976 × 48-core Fujitsu A64FX @2.2 GHz) | - | 7,630,848 | Tofu interconnect D | Fujitsu | Riken Center for Computational Science; Japan | 2020 | Linux (RHEL) |
| 10 ▼ | 434.90; 574.84 | Alps | HPE Cray EX254n | 748,800 (10,400 × 72-Arm Neoverse V2 cores Nvidia Grace @3.1 GHz) | 1,372,800 (10,400 × 132 Nvidia Hopper H100) | 2,121,600 | Slingshot-11 | HPE | CSCS Swiss National Supercomputing Centre; Switzerland | 2024 | Linux (HPE Cray OS) |

Legend:

- Rank – Position within the TOP500 ranking. In the TOP500 list table, the computers are ordered first by their Rmax value. In the case of equal performances (Rmax value) for different computers, the order is by Rpeak. For sites that have the same computer, the order is by memory size and then alphabetically.
- Rmax – The highest score measured using the LINPACK benchmarks suite. This is the number that is used to rank the computers. Measured in quadrillions of 64-bit floating point operations per second, i.e., petaFLOPS.
- Rpeak – This is the theoretical peak performance of the system. Computed in petaFLOPS.
- Name – Some supercomputers are unique, at least in their location, and are thus named by their owner.
- Model – The computing platform as it is marketed.
- Processor – The instruction set architecture or processor microarchitecture, alongside GPU and accelerators when available.
- Interconnect – The interconnect between computing nodes. InfiniBand is most used (38%) by performance share, while Gigabit Ethernet is most used (54%) by number of computers.
- Manufacturer – The manufacturer of the platform and hardware.
- Site – The name of the facility operating the supercomputer.
- Country – The country in which the computer is located.
- Year – The year of installation or last major update.
- Operating system – The operating system that the computer uses.

== Applications ==
The application of supercomputers has evolved significantly since the 1970s, expanding across numerous fields of scientific and governmental research. In the 1970s, the Cray-1 supercomputer was instrumental in early weather forecasting and aerodynamic research. The scope broadened in the 1980s with machines like the CDC Cyber facilitating probabilistic analyses and modeling radiation shielding. The 1990s saw supercomputers, such as the EFF DES cracker, applied to brute-force tasks like code-breaking.

Moving into the 2000s, supercomputers became crucial for national security applications; the ASCI Q was used to conduct 3D nuclear test simulations, satisfying the requirements of the Nuclear Non-Proliferation Treaty without physical testing. The 2010s brought advancements in molecular dynamics simulations, exemplified by the use of the Tianhe-1A. The trend has continued into the 2020s, with supercomputers providing powerful tools for research into outbreak prevention and electrochemical reactions.

Beyond these specific decades, supercomputers have been pivotal in major scientific endeavors. For instance, the IBM Blue Gene/P was used to simulate a network of artificial neurons equivalent to one percent of a human cerebral cortex (1.6 billion neurons and 9 trillion connections), and the same team later simulated the entirety of a rat's brain.

Modern applications are diverse and critical. Weather forecasting relies heavily on supercomputing power, with the National Oceanic and Atmospheric Administration utilizing these systems to process vast quantities of observational data to enhance forecast accuracy. The United States also employs supercomputers through the Advanced Simulation and Computing Program to maintain and simulate its nuclear stockpile.

The field has its challenges, as highlighted by IBM's abandonment of the ambitious Blue Waters petascale project in 2011. Despite such setbacks, the utility of supercomputers continues to grow. A recent example of their critical role occurred in early 2020, when supercomputers were rapidly deployed to run extensive simulations using numerous paralleled CPUs to identify compounds with the potential to stop the spread of COVID-19.

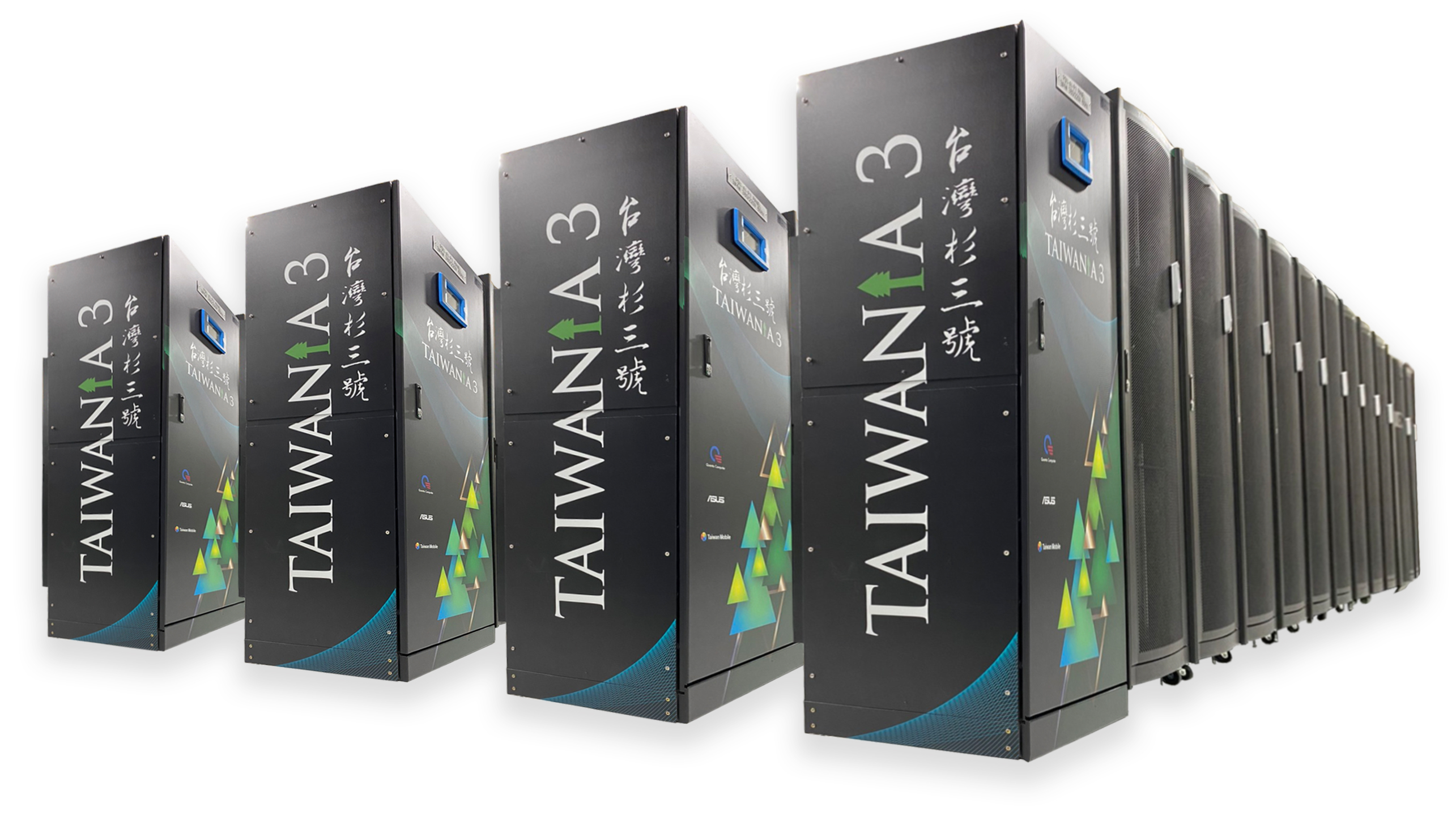
Taiwania 3 is a Taiwanese supercomputer which assisted the scientific community in fighting COVID-19. It was launched in 2020 and has a capacity of about two to three PetaFLOPS.

Supercomputer manufactuers have sold downscaled versions of their supercomputer systems, called deskside supercomputers, such as the NEC SX-6i, which could take up 25 to 37 rack units in a 19-inch rack, instead of taking up several racks like the regular NEC SX-6. These smaller supercomputers were meant for individual departments instead of an entire organization unlike larger supercomputers.

== Development and trends ==
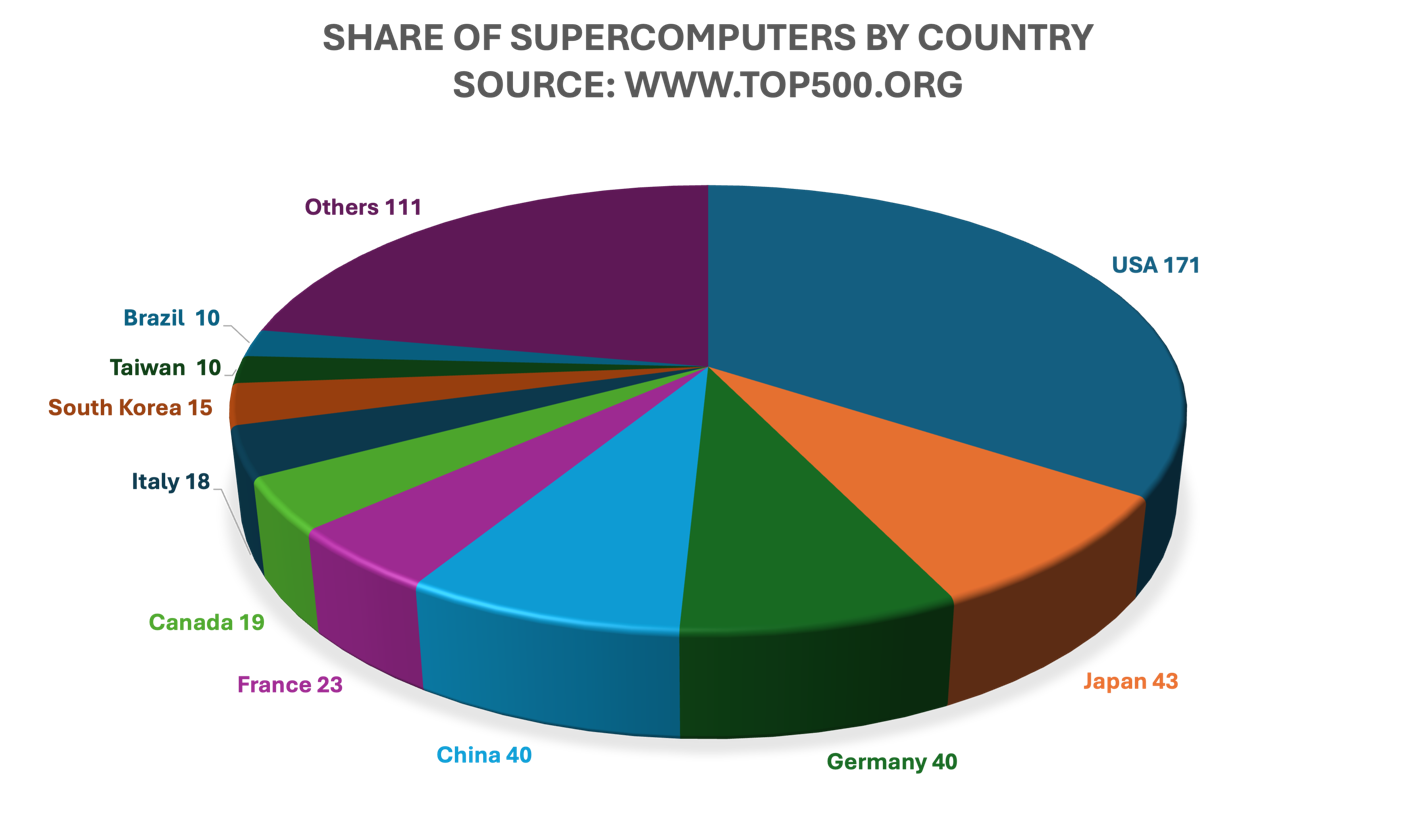
Distribution of TOP500 supercomputers among different countries, in November 2025

In the 2010s, China, the United States, the European Union, and others competed to be the first to create a 1 exaFLOP (10^{18} or one quintillion FLOPS) supercomputer. Erik P. DeBenedictis of Sandia National Laboratories has theorized that a zettaFLOPS (10^{21} or one sextillion FLOPS) computer is required to accomplish full weather modeling, which could cover a two-week time span accurately. Such systems might be built around 2030.

Many Monte Carlo simulations use the same algorithm to process a randomly generated data set; particularly, integro-differential equations describing physical transport processes, the random paths, collisions, and energy and momentum depositions of neutrons, photons, ions, electrons, etc. The next step for microprocessors may be into the third dimension; and specializing to Monte Carlo, the many layers could be identical, simplifying the design and manufacture process.

The cost of operating high performance supercomputers has risen, mainly due to increasing power consumption. In the mid-1990s a top 10 supercomputer required in the range of 100 kilowatts, in 2010 the top 10 supercomputers required between 1 and 2 megawatts. A 2010 study commissioned by DARPA identified power consumption as the most pervasive challenge in achieving Exascale computing. At the time a megawatt per year in energy consumption cost about 1 million dollars. Supercomputing facilities were constructed to efficiently remove the increasing amount of heat produced by modern multi-core central processing units. Based on the energy consumption of the Green 500 list of supercomputers between 2007 and 2011, a supercomputer with 1 exaFLOPS in 2011 would have required nearly 500 megawatts. Operating systems were developed for existing hardware to conserve energy whenever possible. CPU cores not in use during the execution of a parallelized application were put into low-power states, producing energy savings for some supercomputing applications.

The increasing cost of operating supercomputers has been a driving factor in a trend toward bundling of resources through a distributed supercomputer infrastructure. National supercomputing centers first emerged in the US, followed by Germany and Japan. The European Union launched the Partnership for Advanced Computing in Europe (PRACE) with the aim of creating a persistent pan-European supercomputer infrastructure with services to support scientists across the European Union in porting, scaling and optimizing supercomputing applications. Iceland built the world's first zero-emission supercomputer. Located at the Thor Data Center in Reykjavík, Iceland, this supercomputer relies on completely renewable sources for its power rather than fossil fuels. The colder climate also reduces the need for active cooling, making it one of the greenest facilities in the world of computers.

Funding supercomputer hardware also became increasingly difficult. In the mid-1990s a top 10 supercomputer cost about 10 million euros, while in 2010 the top 10 supercomputers required an investment of between 40 and 50 million euros. In the 2000s national governments put in place different strategies to fund supercomputers. In the UK the national government funded supercomputers entirely and high performance computing was put under the control of a national funding agency. Germany developed a mixed funding model, pooling local state funding and federal funding.

== In fiction ==
Examples of supercomputers in fiction include HAL 9000, Multivac, The Machine Stops, GLaDOS, SHODAN, The Evitable Conflict, Vulcan's Hammer, Colossus, WOPR, AM, and Deep Thought. A supercomputer from Thinking Machines was mentioned as the supercomputer used to sequence the DNA extracted from preserved parasites in the Jurassic Park series.

== See also ==
- ACM/IEEE Supercomputing Conference
- ACM SIGHPC
- High-performance computing
- High-performance technical computing
- Jungle computing
- Metacomputing
- Nvidia Tesla Personal Supercomputer
- Parallel computing
- Supercomputing in China
- Supercomputing in Europe
- Supercomputing in India
- Supercomputing in Japan
- SLURM
- Testing high-performance computing applications
- Ultra Network Technologies
- Quantum computing
