= Joanne Martin =

Engineer

- Education: PhD, Mathematics
- Alma mater: Johns Hopkins University; Appalachian State University
- Occupation(s): Security and Risk Consultant

Joanne Martin is an American security and risk consultant who worked as IBM's Vice President of Technology from 2010–2012, and as Chief Information Security Officer (CISO) and VP for IT Risk from 2012–2015.

== Education ==
Martin earned her Ph.D. in mathematics in 1981 from Johns Hopkins University.

== Career ==
She began her research career at Los Alamos National Laboratory. Martin joined IBM as a research staff member in 1984 at the Thomas J Watson Research Center, and "served on the management team that developed and delivered IBM's first supercomputer, with specific responsibility for the performance management and analysis of the system."

Working Mother magazine named her as one of the 25 most influential working mothers for 1998.

She has served as an advisor to various U.S. Agencies, including the US Department of Energy, National Science Foundation, and National Research Council. She was inducted into the Women in Technology Hall of Fame in 2012.
