= Michael George =

Michael or Mike George may refer to:

- Michael George (footballer), Australian rules footballer
- Michael J. George, member of the Minnesota House of Representatives
- Mike George (wrestler), American professional wrestler
- Michael Carl George, American murderer
