= Daniel A. Reed (computer scientist) =

Computer scientist

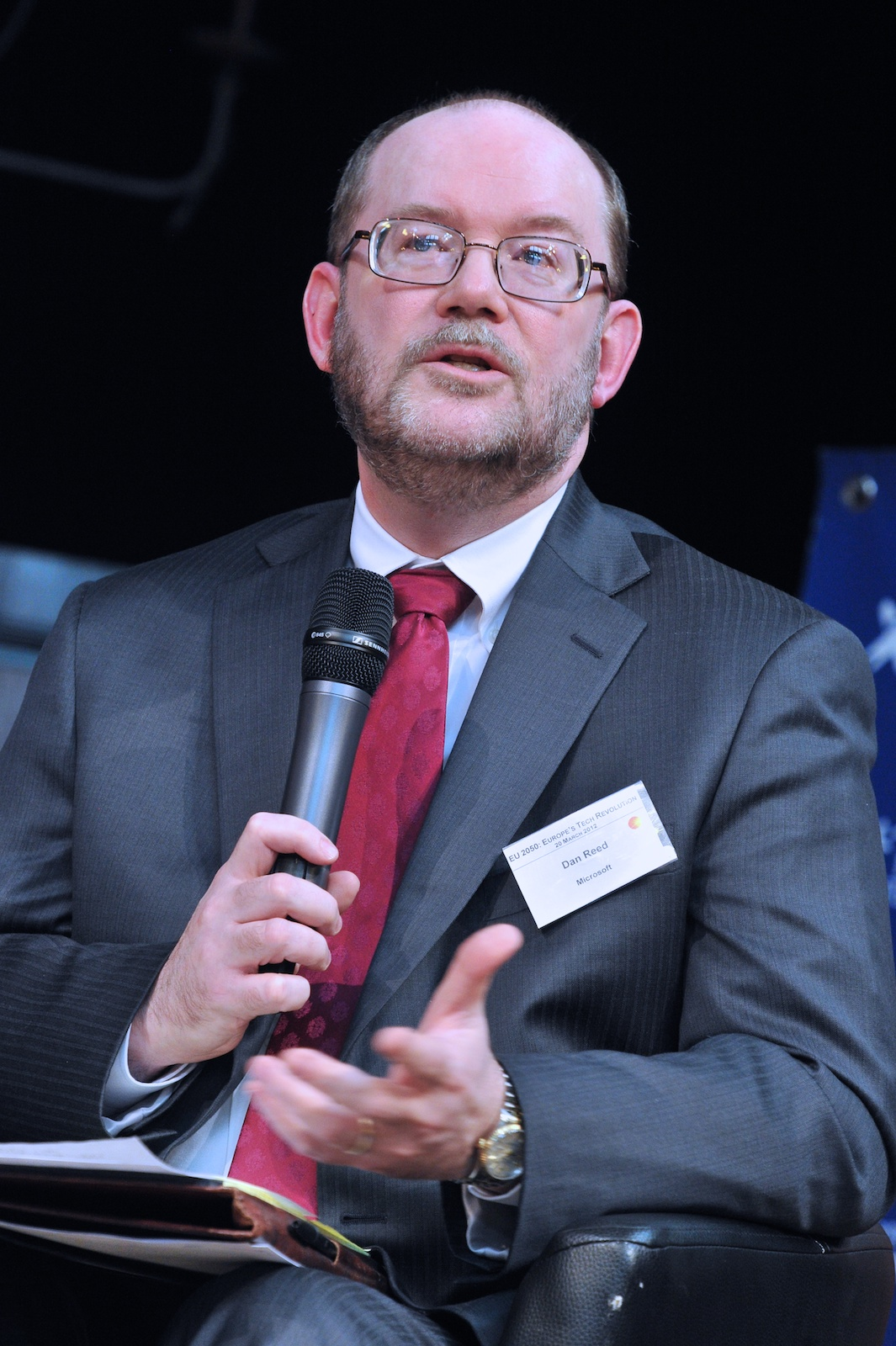
- Daniel A. Reed in 2012
- Education: Purdue University
- Scientific career
- Fields: Computer Science
- Workplaces: Renaissance Computing Institute

Daniel A. Reed is a computer scientist who is the provost of the University of Utah. He is current Chair of the National Science Board and was previously vice-president for research at the University of Iowa.
