= Bjorn Stevens =

American meteorologist and climate scientist

Bjorn Stevens (born 19 April 1966) is an American climate scientist who is managing director of the Max Planck Institute for Meteorology in Hamburg. He is known for his research on climate sensitivity, aerosols and especially clouds.

== Early childhood and education ==
Bjorn Stevens was born in Augsburg, Germany, to American and German parents. He lived in several Anglophone countries during his childhood and eventually moved to the United States. He earned an M.Sc. degree in electrical engineering from Iowa State University in 1990 and a PhD in atmospheric science from Colorado State University in 1996. He was a post-doctoral fellow with the Advanced Study Program of the National Center for Atmospheric Research in Boulder from 1996 to 1998.

== Career ==
In 1998 Stevens briefly returned to Germany as a Humboldt Fellow with the Max Planck Institute for Meteorology from 1998 to 1999. He joined UCLA's Department of Atmospheric Sciences as an assistant professor in 1999, being promoted to associate professor in 2003 and tenured professor in 2007. He was an affiliate scientist at the National Center for Atmospheric Research from 2000 to 2008.

In 2008 he joined Max Planck Institute for Meteorology in Hamburg as a director and scientific member, eventually becoming managing director. He was a co-author of the chapter on clouds and aerosols in the IPCC Fifth Assessment Report (2014).

He has been a co-lead of the World Climate Research Programme's Grand Challenge on Clouds, Circulation and Climate Sensitivity for several years. His research has contributed to the understanding of cloud formation, the reaction of clouds to a warming atmosphere, and the response of radiative forcing to aerosol disturbances.

In 2025, he is focusing on the intersection of climate change and Artificial Intelligence.

According to Google Scholar, in mid-2025, his research has been cited over 60,000 times, and he has an h-index of 74.

== Honors ==
- The American Meteorological Society's Clarence Leroy Meisinger Award for “pioneering advances in understanding and modeling of cloud-topped boundary layer”.
