= Gordon Bell Prize =

Prize for high performance computing

The Gordon Bell Prize is an award presented by the Association for Computing Machinery each year in conjunction with the SC Conference series (formerly known as the Supercomputing Conference). The prize recognizes outstanding achievement in high-performance computing applications. The main purpose is to track the progress over time of parallel computing, by acknowledging and rewarding innovation in applying high-performance computing to applications in science, engineering, and large-scale data analytics. The prize was established in 1987. A cash award of $10,000 (since 2011) accompanies the recognition, funded by Gordon Bell, a pioneer in high-performance and parallel computing.

The modern prize awards were preceded by a nominal prize ($100) established by Alan Karp, a numerical analyst (then of IBM) who challenged claims of MIMD performance improvements proposed in the Letters to the Editor section of the Communications of the ACM. Karp went on to be one of the first Gordon Bell Prize judges.

Individuals or teams may apply for the award by submitting a technical paper describing their work through the SC conference submissions process. Finalists present their work at that year's conference, and their submissions are included in the conference proceedings.

== Prize criteria ==
The ACM Gordon Bell Prize is primarily intended to recognize performance achievements that demonstrate:

- evidence of important algorithmic and/or implementation innovations
- clear improvement over the previous state-of-the-art
- solutions that don’t depend on one-of-a-kind architectures (systems that can only be used to address a narrow range of problems, or that can’t be replicated by others)
- performance measurements that have been characterized in terms of scalability (strong as well as weak scaling), time to solution, efficiency (in using bottleneck resources, such as memory size or bandwidth, communications bandwidth, I/O), and/or peak performance
- achievements that are generalizable, in the sense that other people can learn and benefit from the innovations

In earlier years, multiple prizes were sometimes awarded to reflect different types of achievements. According to current policies, the Prize can be awarded in one or more of the following categories, depending on the entries received in a given year:

Peak Performance: If the entry demonstrates outstanding performance in terms of floating point operations per second on an important science/engineering problem; the efficiency of the application in using bottleneck resources (such as memory size or bandwidth) is also taken into consideration.

Special Achievement in Scalability, Special Achievement in Time to Solution: If the entry demonstrates exceptional scalability, in terms of both strong and weak scaling, and/or total time to solve an important science/engineering problem.

== See also ==
- List of computer science awards
