= High-performance technical computing =

High-performance technical computing (HPTC) is the application of high performance computing (HPC) to technical, as opposed to business or scientific, problems (although the lines between the various disciplines are necessarily vague). HPTC often refers to the application of HPC to engineering problems and includes computational fluid dynamics, simulation, modeling, and seismic tomography (particularly in the petrochemical industry).

== See also ==
- Supercomputer
