= Symmetric algebra =

"Smallest" commutative algebra that contains a vector space

In mathematics, the symmetric algebra S(V) (also denoted Sym(V)) on a vector space V over a field K is a commutative algebra over K that contains V, and is, in some sense, minimal for this property. Here, "minimal" means that S(V) satisfies the following universal property: for every linear map f from V to a commutative algebra A, there is a unique algebra homomorphism g : S(V) → A such that f = g ∘ i, where i is the inclusion map of V in S(V).

If B is a basis of V, the symmetric algebra S(V) can be identified, through a canonical isomorphism, to the polynomial ring K[B], where the elements of B are considered as indeterminates. Therefore, the symmetric algebra over V can be viewed as a "coordinate free" polynomial ring over V.

The symmetric algebra S(V) can be built as the quotient of the tensor algebra T(V) by the two-sided ideal generated by the elements of the form x ⊗ y − y ⊗ x.

All these definitions and properties extend naturally to the case where V is a module (not necessarily a free one) over a commutative ring.

== Construction ==
=== From tensor algebra ===
It is possible to use the tensor algebra T(V) to describe the symmetric algebra S(V). In fact, S(V) can be defined as the quotient algebra of T(V) by the two-sided ideal generated by the commutators $v\otimes w - w\otimes v.$

It is straightforward to verify that the resulting algebra satisfies the universal property stated in the introduction. Because of the universal property of the tensor algebra, a linear map f from V to a commutative algebra A extends to an algebra homomorphism $T(V)\rightarrow A$, which factors through S(V) because A is commutative. The extension of f to an algebra homomorphism $S(V)\rightarrow A$ is unique because V generates S(V) as a K-algebra.

This results also directly from a general result of category theory, which asserts that the composition of two left adjoint functors is also a left adjoint functor. Here, the forgetful functor from commutative algebras to vector spaces or modules (forgetting the multiplication) is the composition of the forgetful functors from commutative algebras to associative algebras (forgetting commutativity), and from associative algebras to vectors or modules (forgetting the multiplication). As the tensor algebra and the quotient by commutators are left adjoint to these forgetful functors, their composition is left adjoint to the forgetful functor from commutative algebra to vectors or modules, and this proves the desired universal property.

=== From polynomial ring ===
The symmetric algebra S(V) can also be built from polynomial rings.

If V is a K-vector space or a free K-module, with a basis B, let K[B] be the polynomial ring that has the elements of B as indeterminates. The homogeneous polynomials of degree one form a vector space or a free module that can be identified with V. It is straightforward to verify that this makes K[B] a solution to the universal problem stated in the introduction. This implies that K[B] and S(V) are canonically isomorphic, and can therefore be identified. This results also immediately from general considerations of category theory, since free modules and polynomial rings are free objects of their respective categories.

If V is a module that is not free, it can be written $V=L/M,$ where L is a free module, and M is a submodule of L. In this case, one has

$$S(V)=S(L/M)=S(L)/\langle M\rangle,$$

where $\langle M\rangle$ is the ideal generated by M. (Here, equals signs mean equality up to a canonical isomorphism.) Again this can be proved by showing that one has a solution of the universal property, and this can be done either by a straightforward but boring computation, or by using category theory, and more specifically, the fact that a quotient is the solution of the universal problem for morphisms that map to zero a given subset. (Depending on the case, the kernel is a normal subgroup, a submodule or an ideal, and the usual definition of quotients can be viewed as a proof of the existence of a solution of the universal problem.)

== Grading ==
The symmetric algebra is a graded algebra. That is, it is a direct sum

$$S(V)=\bigoplus_{n=0}^\infty S^n(V),$$

where $S^n(V),$ called the nth symmetric power of V, is the vector subspace or submodule generated by the products of n elements of V. (The second symmetric power $S^2(V)$ is sometimes called the symmetric square of V).

This can be proved by various means. One follows from the tensor-algebra construction: since the tensor algebra is graded, and the symmetric algebra is its quotient by a homogeneous ideal: the ideal generated by all $x \otimes y - y \otimes x,$ where x and y are in V, that is, homogeneous of degree one.

In the case of a vector space or a free module, the gradation is the gradation of the polynomials by the total degree. A non-free module can be written as L / M, where L is a free module of base B; its symmetric algebra is the quotient of the (graded) symmetric algebra of L (a polynomial ring) by the homogeneous ideal generated by the elements of M, which are homogeneous of degree one.

One can also define $S^n(V)$ as the solution of the universal problem for n-linear symmetric functions from V into a vector space or a module, and then verify that the direct sum of all $S^n(V)$ satisfies the universal problem for the symmetric algebra.

== Relationship with symmetric tensors ==
As the symmetric algebra of a vector space is a quotient of the tensor algebra, an element of the symmetric algebra is not a tensor, and, in particular, is not a symmetric tensor. However, symmetric tensors are strongly related to the symmetric algebra.

A symmetric tensor of degree n is an element of T^{n}(V) that is invariant under the action of the symmetric group $\mathcal S_n.$ More precisely, given $\sigma\in \mathcal S_n,$ the transformation $v_1\otimes \cdots \otimes v_n \mapsto v_{\sigma(1)}\otimes \cdots \otimes v_{\sigma(n)}$ defines a linear endomorphism of T^{n}(V). A symmetric tensor is a tensor that is invariant under all these endomorphisms. The symmetric tensors of degree n form a vector subspace (or module) Sym^{n}(V) ⊂ T^{n}(V). The symmetric tensors are the elements of the direct sum $\textstyle \bigoplus_{n=0}^\infty \operatorname{Sym}^n(V),$ which is a graded vector space (or a graded module). It is not an algebra, as the tensor product of two symmetric tensors is not symmetric in general.

Let $\pi_n$ be the restriction to Sym^{n}(V) of the canonical surjection $T^n(V)\to S^n(V).$ If n! is invertible in the ground field (or ring), then $\pi_n$ is an isomorphism. This is always the case with a ground field of characteristic zero. The inverse isomorphism is the linear map defined (on products of n vectors) by the symmetrization

$$v_1\cdots v_n \mapsto \frac 1{n!} \sum_{\sigma \in S_n} v_{\sigma(1)}\otimes \cdots \otimes v_{\sigma(n)}.$$

The map $\pi_n$ is not injective if the characteristic is less than n+1; for example $\pi_n(x\otimes y+y\otimes x) = 2xy$ is zero in characteristic two. Over a ring of characteristic zero, $\pi_n$ can be non surjective; for example, over the integers, if x and y are two linearly independent elements of V = S^{1}(V) that are not in 2V, then $xy\not\in \pi_n(\operatorname{Sym}^2(V)),$ since $\frac 12 (x\otimes y +y\otimes x) \not\in \operatorname{Sym}^2(V).$

In summary, over a field of characteristic zero, the symmetric tensors and the symmetric algebra form two isomorphic graded vector spaces. They can thus be identified as far as only the vector space structure is concerned, but they cannot be identified as soon as products are involved. Moreover, this isomorphism does not extend to the cases of fields of positive characteristic and rings that do not contain the rational numbers.

== Categorical properties ==
Given a module V over a commutative ring K, the symmetric algebra S(V) can be defined by the following universal property:

For every K-linear map f from V to a commutative K-algebra A, there is a unique K-algebra homomorphism $g:S(V)\to A$ such that $f=g\circ i,$ where i is the inclusion of V in S(V).

As for every universal property, as soon as a solution exists, this defines uniquely the symmetric algebra, up to a canonical isomorphism. It follows that all properties of the symmetric algebra can be deduced from the universal property. This section is devoted to the main properties that belong to category theory.

The symmetric algebra is a functor from the category of K-modules to the category of K-commutative algebra, since the universal property implies that every module homomorphism $f:V\to W$ can be uniquely extended to an algebra homomorphism $S(f):S(V)\to S(W).$

The universal property can be reformulated by saying that the symmetric algebra is a left adjoint to the forgetful functor that sends a commutative algebra to its underlying module.

== Symmetric algebra of an affine space ==
One can analogously construct the symmetric algebra on an affine space. The key difference is that the symmetric algebra of an affine space is not a graded algebra, but a filtered algebra: one can determine the degree of a polynomial on an affine space, but not its homogeneous parts.

For instance, given a linear polynomial on a vector space, one can determine its constant part by evaluating at 0. On an affine space, there is no distinguished point, so one cannot do this (choosing a point turns an affine space into a vector space).

== Analogy with exterior algebra ==
The S^{k} are functors comparable to the exterior powers; here, though, the dimension grows with k; it is given by

$$\operatorname{dim}(S^k(V)) = \binom{n+k-1}{k}$$

where n is the dimension of V. This binomial coefficient is the number of n-variable monomials of degree k. In fact, the symmetric algebra and the exterior algebra appear as the isotypical components of the trivial and sign representation of the action of $S_n$ acting on the tensor product $V^{\otimes n}$ (for example over the complex field)

== As a Hopf algebra ==
The symmetric algebra can be given the structure of a Hopf algebra. See Tensor algebra for details.

== As a universal enveloping algebra ==
The symmetric algebra S(V) is the universal enveloping algebra of an abelian Lie algebra, i.e. one in which the Lie bracket is identically 0.

== See also ==
- exterior algebra, the alternating algebra analog
- graded-symmetric algebra, a common generalization of a symmetric algebra and an exterior algebra
- Weyl algebra, a quantum deformation of the symmetric algebra by a symplectic form
- Clifford algebra, a quantum deformation of the exterior algebra by a quadratic form
- Proj construction § Proj of a quasi-coherent sheaf, an application of symmetric algebras in algebraic geometry
