= Alternating multilinear map =

Multilinear map that is 0 whenever arguments are linearly dependent

In mathematics, more specifically in multilinear algebra, an alternating multilinear map is a multilinear map with all arguments belonging to the same vector space (for example, a bilinear form or a multilinear form) that is zero whenever any pair of its arguments is equal. This generalizes directly to a module over a commutative ring.

The notion of alternatization (or alternatisation) is used to derive an alternating multilinear map from any multilinear map of which all arguments belong to the same space.

== Definition ==
Let $R$ be a commutative ring and $V$, $W$ be modules over $R$. A multilinear map of the form $f: V^n \to W$ is said to be alternating if it satisfies the following equivalent conditions:

1. whenever there exists $1 \leq i \leq n-1$ such that $x_i = x_{i+1}$ then $f(x_1,\ldots,x_n) = 0$.
2. whenever there exists $1 \leq i \neq j \leq n$ such that $x_i = x_j$ then $f(x_1,\ldots,x_n) = 0$.

== Vector spaces ==
Let $V, W$ be vector spaces over the same field. Then a multilinear map of the form $f: V^n \to W$ is alternating if it satisfies the following condition:

- if $x_1,\ldots,x_n$ are linearly dependent then $f(x_1,\ldots,x_n) = 0$.

== Example ==
In a Lie algebra, the Lie bracket is an alternating bilinear map. The determinant of a matrix is a multilinear alternating map of the rows or columns of the matrix.

== Properties ==
If any component $x_i$ of an alternating multilinear map is replaced by $x_i + c x_j$ for any $j \neq i$ and $c$ in the base ring $R$, then the value of that map is not changed.

Every alternating multilinear map is antisymmetric, meaning that
$$f(\dots,x_i,x_{i+1},\dots)=-f(\dots,x_{i+1},x_i,\dots) \quad \text{ for any } 1 \leq i \leq n-1,$$
or equivalently,
$$f(x_{\sigma(1)},\dots,x_{\sigma(n)}) = (\sgn\sigma)f(x_1,\dots,x_n) \quad \text{ for any } \sigma\in \mathrm{S}_n,$$
where $\mathrm{S}_n$ denotes the permutation group of degree $n$ and $\sgn\sigma$ is the sign of $\sigma$. If 2 is a unit in the base ring $R$, then every antisymmetric $n$-multilinear form is alternating.

== Alternatization ==
Given a multilinear map of the form $f : V^n \to W,$ the alternating multilinear map $g : V^n \to W$ defined by
$$g(x_1, \ldots, x_n) \mathrel{:=} \sum_{\sigma \in S_n} \sgn(\sigma)f(x_{\sigma(1)}, \ldots, x_{\sigma(n)})$$
is said to be the alternatization of $f$.

Properties

- The alternatization of an $n$-multilinear alternating map is $n!$ times itself.
- The alternatization of a symmetric map is zero.
- The alternatization of a bilinear map is bilinear. Most notably, the alternatization of any cocycle is bilinear. This fact plays a crucial role in identifying the second cohomology group of a lattice with the group of alternating bilinear forms on a lattice.

== See also ==
- Alternating algebra
- Bilinear map
- Exterior algebra § Alternating multilinear forms
- Map (mathematics)
- Multilinear algebra
- Multilinear map
- Multilinear form
- Symmetrization
