= Trilinear =

Trilinear may refer to:

- Trilinear filtering, a method in computer graphics for choosing the color of a texture
- Trilinear form, a type of mathematical function from a vector space to the underlying field
- Trilinear interpolation, an extension of linear interpolation for interpolating functions of three variables on a rectilinear 3D grid
- Trilinear map, a type of mathematical function between vector spaces
- Trilinear coordinates
- Trilinear polarity, in geometry
