= Grosshans =

Grosshans is a surname of German origin, meaning "large Hans", referring to a large man named Hans. Notable people with the surname include:

- Frank Grosshans (born 1942), American mathematician
- Jamie Grosshans (born 1978/1979), American judge

== See also ==
- Grosshans subgroup, an algebraic subgroup
