= Representations of classical groups =

In mathematics, the finite-dimensional representations of the complex classical Lie groups $GL(n,\mathbb{C})$, $SL(n,\mathbb{C})$, $O(n,\mathbb{C})$, $SO(n,\mathbb{C})$, $Sp(2n,\mathbb{C})$, can be constructed using the general representation theory of semisimple Lie algebras. The groups $SL(n,\mathbb{C})$, $SO(n,\mathbb{C})$, $Sp(2n,\mathbb{C})$ are indeed simple Lie groups, and their finite-dimensional representations coincide with those of their maximal compact subgroups, respectively $SU(n)$, $SO(n)$, $Sp(n)$. In the classification of simple Lie algebras, the corresponding algebras are

$$\begin{align}
SL(n,\mathbb{C})&\to A_{n-1}
\\
SO(n_\text{odd},\mathbb{C})&\to B_{\frac{n-1}{2}}
\\
SO(n_\text{even},\mathbb{C}) &\to  D_{\frac{n}{2}}
\\
Sp(2n,\mathbb{C})&\to C_n
\end{align}$$

However, since the complex classical Lie groups are linear groups, their representations are tensor representations. Each irreducible representation is labelled by a Young diagram, which encodes its structure and properties.

== General linear group, special linear group and unitary group ==
=== Weyl's construction of tensor representations ===
Let $V=\mathbb{C}^n$ be the defining representation of the general linear group $GL(n,\mathbb{C})$. Tensor representations are the subrepresentations of $V^{\otimes k}$ (these are sometimes called polynomial representations). The irreducible subrepresentations of $V^{\otimes k}$ are the images of $V$ by Schur functors $\mathbb{S}^\lambda$ associated to integer partitions $\lambda$ of $k$ into at most $n$ integers, i.e. to Young diagrams of size $\lambda_1+\cdots + \lambda_n = k$ with $\lambda_{n+1}=0$. (If $\lambda_{n+1}>0$ then $\mathbb{S}^\lambda(V)=0$.) Schur functors are defined using Young symmetrizers of the symmetric group $S_k$, which acts naturally on $V^{\otimes k}$. We write $V_\lambda = \mathbb{S}^\lambda(V)$.

The dimensions of these irreducible representations are

$$\dim V_\lambda = \prod_{1\leq i < j \leq n}\frac{\lambda_i-\lambda_j +j-i}{j-i}
= \prod_{(i,j)\in \lambda} \frac{n-i+j}{h_\lambda(i,j)}$$

where $h_\lambda(i,j)$ is the hook length of the cell $(i,j)$ in the Young diagram $\lambda$.

- The first formula for the dimension is a special case of a formula that gives the characters of representations in terms of Schur polynomials, $\chi_\lambda(g) = s_\lambda(x_1,\dots, x_n)$ where $x_1,\dots ,x_n$ are the eigenvalues of $g\in GL(n,\mathbb{C})$.
- The second formula for the dimension is sometimes called Stanley's hook content formula.

Examples of tensor representations:

Tensor representation of $GL(n,\mathbb{C})$	Dimension	Young diagram
Trivial representation	$1$	$()$
Determinant representation	$1$	$(1^n)$
Defining representation $V$	$n$	$(1)$
Symmetric representation $\text{Sym}^kV$	$\binom{n+k-1}{k}$	$(k)$
Antisymmetric representation $\Lambda^k V$	$\binom{n}{k}$	$(1^k)$

=== General irreducible representations ===
Not all irreducible representations of $GL(n,\mathbb C)$ are tensor representations. In general, irreducible representations of $GL(n,\mathbb C)$ are mixed tensor representations, i.e. subrepresentations of $V^{\otimes r} \otimes (V^*)^{\otimes s}$, where $V^*$ is the dual representation of $V$ (these are sometimes called rational representations). In the end, the set of irreducible representations of $GL(n,\mathbb C)$ is labeled by non increasing sequences of $n$ integers $\lambda_1\geq \dots \geq \lambda_n$. If $\lambda_k \geq 0, \lambda_{k+1} \leq 0$, we can associate to $(\lambda_1, \dots ,\lambda_n)$ the pair of Young tableaux $([\lambda_1\dots\lambda_k],[-\lambda_n,\dots,-\lambda_{k+1}])$. This shows that irreducible representations of $GL(n,\mathbb C)$ can be labeled by pairs of Young tableaux . Let us denote $V_{\lambda\mu} = V_{\lambda_1,\dots,\lambda_n}$ the irreducible representation of $GL(n,\mathbb C)$ corresponding to the pair $(\lambda,\mu)$ or equivalently to the sequence $(\lambda_1,\dots,\lambda_n)$. With these notations,

- $V_{\lambda}=V_{\lambda()}, V = V_{(1)()}$
- $(V_{\lambda\mu})^* = V_{\mu\lambda}$
- For $k \in \mathbb Z$, denoting $D_k$ the one-dimensional representation in which $GL(n,\mathbb C)$ acts by $(\det)^k$, $V_{\lambda_1,\dots,\lambda_n} = V_{\lambda_1+k,\dots,\lambda_n+k} \otimes D_{-k}$. If $k$ is large enough that $\lambda_n + k \geq 0$, this gives an explicit description of $V_{\lambda_1, \dots,\lambda_n}$ in terms of a Schur functor.
- The dimension of $V_{\lambda\mu}$ where $\lambda = (\lambda_1,\dots,\lambda_r), \mu=(\mu_1,\dots,\mu_s)$ is

$\dim(V_{\lambda\mu}) = d_\lambda d_\mu \prod_{i=1}^r \frac{(1-i-s+n)_{\lambda_i}}{(1-i+r)_{\lambda_i}} \prod_{j=1}^s \frac{(1-j-r+n)_{\mu_i}}{(1-j+s)_{\mu_i}}\prod_{i=1}^r \prod_{j=1}^s \frac{n+1 + \lambda_i + \mu_j - i- j }{n+1 -i -j }$ where $d_\lambda = \prod_{1 \leq i < j \leq r} \frac{\lambda_i - \lambda_j + j - i}{j-i}$. See for an interpretation as a product of n-dependent factors divided by products of hook lengths.

=== Case of the special linear group ===
Two representations $V_{\lambda},V_{\lambda'}$ of $GL(n,\mathbb{C})$ are equivalent as representations of the special linear group $SL(n,\mathbb{C})$ if and only if there is $k\in\mathbb{Z}$ such that $\forall i,\ \lambda_i-\lambda'_i=k$. For instance, the determinant representation $V_{(1^n)}$ is trivial in $SL(n,\mathbb{C})$, i.e. it is equivalent to $V_{()}$. In particular, irreducible representations of $SL(n,\mathbb C)$ can be indexed by Young tableaux, and are all tensor representations (not mixed).

=== Case of the unitary group ===
The unitary group is the maximal compact subgroup of $GL(n,\mathbb C)$. The complexification of its Lie algebra $\mathfrak u(n) = \{a \in \mathcal M(n,\mathbb C), a^\dagger + a = 0\}$ is the algebra $\mathfrak{gl}(n,\mathbb C)$. In Lie theoretic terms, $U(n)$ is the compact real form of $GL(n,\mathbb C)$, which means that complex linear, continuous irreducible representations of the latter are in one-to-one correspondence with complex linear, algebraic irreps of the former, via the inclusion $U(n) \rightarrow GL(n,\mathbb C)$.

=== Tensor products ===
Tensor products of finite-dimensional representations of $GL(n,\mathbb{C})$ are given by the following formula:

$$V_{\lambda_1\mu_1} \otimes V_{\lambda_2\mu_2} = \bigoplus_{\nu,\rho} V_{\nu\rho}^{\oplus \Gamma^{\nu\rho}_{\lambda_1\mu_1,\lambda_2\mu_2}},$$

where $\Gamma^{\nu\rho}_{\lambda_1\mu_1,\lambda_2\mu_2} = 0$ unless $|\nu| \leq |\lambda_1| + |\lambda_2|$ and $|\rho| \leq |\mu_1| + |\mu_2|$. Calling $l(\lambda)$ the number of lines in a tableau, if $l(\lambda_1) + l(\lambda_2) + l(\mu_1) + l(\mu_2) \leq n$, then

$$\Gamma^{\nu\rho}_{\lambda_1\mu_1,\lambda_2\mu_2} = \sum_{\alpha,\beta,\eta,\theta} \left(\sum_\kappa c^{\lambda_1}_{\kappa,\alpha} c^{\mu_2}_{\kappa,\beta}\right)\left(\sum_\gamma c^{\lambda_2}_{\gamma,\eta}c^{\mu_1}_{\gamma,\theta}\right)c^{\nu}_{\alpha,\theta}c^{\rho}_{\beta,\eta},$$

where the natural integers $c_{\lambda,\mu}^\nu$ are Littlewood-Richardson coefficients.

Below are a few examples of such tensor products:

$R_1$	$R_2$	Tensor product $R_1 \otimes R_2$
$V_{\lambda()}$	$V_{\mu()}$	$\sum_\nu c^\nu_{\lambda \mu}V_{\nu()}$
$V_{\lambda()}$	$V_{()\mu}$	$\sum_{\kappa,\nu,\rho} c^\lambda_{\kappa\nu} c^{\mu}_{\kappa\rho} V_{\nu\rho}$
$V_{()(1)}$	$V_{(1)()}$	$V_{(1)(1)} + V_{()()}$
$V_{()(1)}$	$V_{(k)()}$	$V_{(k)(1)} + V_{(k-1)()}$
$V_{(1)()}$	$V_{(k)()}$	$V_{(k+1)()} + V_{(k,1)()}$
$V_{(1)(1)}$	$V_{(1)(1)}$	$V_{(2)(2)} + V_{(2)(11)} + V_{(11)(2)} + V_{(11)(11)} + 2V_{(1)(1)} + V_{()()}$

In the case of tensor representations, 3-j symbols and 6-j symbols are known.

== Orthogonal group and special orthogonal group ==
In addition to the Lie group representations described here, the orthogonal group $O(n,\mathbb{C})$ and special orthogonal group $SO(n,\mathbb{C})$ have spin representations, which are projective representations of these groups, i.e. representations of their universal covering groups.

=== Construction of representations ===
Since $O(n,\mathbb{C})$ is a subgroup of $GL(n,\mathbb{C})$, any irreducible representation of $GL(n,\mathbb{C})$ is also a representation of $O(n,\mathbb{C})$, which may however not be irreducible. In order for a tensor representation of $O(n,\mathbb{C})$ to be irreducible, the tensors must be traceless.

Irreducible representations of $O(n,\mathbb{C})$ are parametrized by a subset of the Young diagrams associated to irreducible representations of $GL(n,\mathbb{C})$: the diagrams such that the sum of the lengths of the first two columns is at most $n$. The irreducible representation $U_\lambda$ that corresponds to such a diagram is a subrepresentation of the corresponding $GL(n,\mathbb{C})$ representation $V_\lambda$. For example, in the case of symmetric tensors,

$$V_{(k)} = U_{(k)} \oplus V_{(k-2)}$$

=== Case of the special orthogonal group ===
The antisymmetric tensor $U_{(1^n)}$ is a one-dimensional representation of $O(n,\mathbb{C})$, which is trivial for $SO(n,\mathbb{C})$. Then $U_{(1^n)}\otimes U_\lambda = U_{\lambda'}$ where $\lambda'$ is obtained from $\lambda$ by acting on the length of the first column as $\tilde{\lambda}_1\to n-\tilde{\lambda}_1$.

- For $n$ odd, the irreducible representations of $SO(n,\mathbb{C})$ are parametrized by Young diagrams with $\tilde{\lambda}_1\leq\frac{n-1}{2}$ rows.
- For $n$ even, $U_\lambda$ is still irreducible as an $SO(n,\mathbb{C})$ representation if $\tilde{\lambda}_1\leq\frac{n}{2}-1$, but it reduces to a sum of two inequivalent $SO(n,\mathbb{C})$ representations if $\tilde{\lambda}_1=\frac{n}{2}$.

For example, the irreducible representations of $O(3,\mathbb{C})$ correspond to Young diagrams of the types $(k\geq 0),(k\geq 1,1),(1,1,1)$. The irreducible representations of $SO(3,\mathbb{C})$ correspond to $(k\geq 0)$, and $\dim U_{(k)}=2k+1$. On the other hand, the dimensions of the spin representations of $SO(3,\mathbb{C})$ are even integers.

=== Dimensions ===
The dimensions of irreducible representations of $SO(n,\mathbb{C})$ are given by a formula that depends on the parity of $n$:

$$(n\text{ even}) \qquad \dim U_\lambda = \prod_{1\leq i<j\leq \frac{n}{2}} \frac{\lambda_i-\lambda_j-i+j}{-i+j}\cdot \frac{\lambda_i+\lambda_j+n-i-j}{n-i-j}$$
$$(n\text{ odd}) \qquad \dim U_\lambda = \prod_{1\leq i<j\leq \frac{n-1}{2}} \frac{\lambda_i-\lambda_j-i+j}{-i+j}
\prod_{1\leq i\leq j\leq \frac{n-1}{2}} \frac{\lambda_i+\lambda_j+n-i-j}{n-i-j}$$

There is also an expression as a factorized polynomial in $n$:

$$\dim U_\lambda = \prod_{(i,j)\in \lambda,\ i\geq j}
\frac{n+\lambda_i+\lambda_j-i-j}{h_\lambda(i,j)}
\prod_{(i,j)\in \lambda,\ i< j}
\frac{n-\tilde{\lambda}_i-\tilde{\lambda}_j+i+j-2}{h_\lambda(i,j)}$$

where $\lambda_i,\tilde{\lambda}_i,h_\lambda(i,j)$ are respectively row lengths, column lengths and hook lengths. In particular, antisymmetric representations have the same dimensions as their $GL(n,\mathbb{C})$ counterparts, $\dim U_{(1^k)}=\dim V_{(1^k)}$, but symmetric representations do not,

$$\dim U_{(k)} = \dim V_{(k)} - \dim V_{(k-2)} = \binom{n+k-1}{k}- \binom{n+k-3}{k}$$

=== Tensor products ===
In the stable range $|\mu|+|\nu|\leq \left[\frac{n}{2}\right]$, the tensor product multiplicities that appear in the tensor product decomposition $U_\lambda\otimes U_\mu = \oplus_\nu N_{\lambda,\mu,\nu} U_\nu$ are Newell-Littlewood numbers, which do not depend on $n$. Beyond the stable range, the tensor product multiplicities become $n$-dependent modifications of the Newell-Littlewood numbers. For example, for $n\geq 12$, we have

$$\begin{align} {}
[1]\otimes [1] &= [2] + [11] + []
\\ {}
[1]\otimes [2] &= [21] + [3] + [1]
\\ {}
[1]\otimes [11] &= [111] + [21] + [1]
\\ {}
[1]\otimes [21] &=  [31]+[22]+[211]+ [2] + [11]
\\ {}
[1] \otimes [3] &= [4]+[31]+[2]
\\ {}
[2]\otimes [2] &= [4]+[31]+[22]+[2]+[11]+[]
\\ {}
[2]\otimes [11] &= [31]+[211] + [2]+[11]
\\ {}
[11]\otimes [11] &= [1111] + [211] + [22] + [2] + [11] + []
\\ {}
[21]\otimes [3] &=[321]+[411]+[42]+[51]+ [211]+[22]+2[31]+[4]+  [11]+[2]
\end{align}$$

=== Branching rules from the general linear group ===
Since the orthogonal group is a subgroup of the general linear group, representations of $GL(n)$ can be decomposed into representations of $O(n)$. The decomposition of a tensor representation is given in terms of Littlewood-Richardson coefficients $c_{\lambda,\mu}^\nu$ by the Littlewood restriction rule

$$V_\nu^{GL(n)} = \sum_{\lambda,\mu} c_{\lambda,2\mu}^\nu U_\lambda^{O(n)}$$

where $2\mu$ is a partition into even integers. The rule is valid in the stable range $2|\nu|,\tilde{\lambda}_1+\tilde{\lambda}_2\leq n$. The generalization to mixed tensor representations is

$$V_{\lambda\mu}^{GL(n)} = \sum_{\alpha,\beta,\gamma,\delta} c_{\alpha,2\gamma}^\lambda c_{\beta,2\delta}^\mu c_{\alpha,\beta}^\nu U_\nu^{O(n)}$$

Similar branching rules can be written for the symplectic group.

== Symplectic group ==
=== Representations ===
The finite-dimensional irreducible representations of the symplectic group $Sp(2n,\mathbb{C})$ are parametrized by Young diagrams with at most $n$ rows. The dimension of the corresponding representation is

$$\dim W_\lambda = \prod_{i=1}^n \frac{\lambda_i+n-i+1}{n-i+1} \prod_{1\leq i<j\leq n} \frac{\lambda_i-\lambda_j+j-i}{j-i} \cdot \frac{\lambda_i+\lambda_j+2n-i-j+2}{2n-i-j+2}$$

There is also an expression as a factorized polynomial in $n$:

$$\dim W_\lambda = \prod_{(i,j)\in \lambda,\ i> j}
\frac{n+\lambda_i+\lambda_j-i-j+2}{h_\lambda(i,j)}
\prod_{(i,j)\in \lambda,\ i\leq j}
\frac{n-\tilde{\lambda}_i-\tilde{\lambda}_j+i+j}{h_\lambda(i,j)}$$

=== Tensor products ===
Just like in the case of the orthogonal group, tensor product multiplicities are given by Newell-Littlewood numbers in the stable range, and modifications thereof beyond the stable range.
