= System of equations =

Set of equations to be solved together

In mathematics, a system of equations, also known as a set of simultaneous equations or an equation system, is a finite set of equations for which common solutions are sought. An equation system is usually classified in the same manner as single equations, namely as one of the following:

- System of linear equations
- System of nonlinear equations
- System of bilinear equations
- System of polynomial equations
- System of differential equations
- System of difference equations

== See also ==
- Simultaneous equations model, a statistical model in the form of simultaneous linear equations
- Elementary algebra, for elementary methods
