= Strongly positive bilinear form =

Functional analysis form

A bilinear form, a(•,•) whose arguments are elements of normed vector space V is a strongly positive bilinear form if and only if there exists a constant, c>0, such that

$$a(u,u) \geq c \cdot \|u\|^2$$

for all $u\in V$ where $\|\cdot\|$ is the norm on V.
