= Tensor representation =

In mathematics, the tensor representations of the general linear group are those that are obtained by taking finitely many tensor products of the fundamental representation and its dual. The irreducible factors of such a representation are also called tensor representations, and can be obtained by applying Schur functors (associated to Young tableaux). These coincide with the rational representations of the general linear group.

More generally, a matrix group is any subgroup of the general linear group. A tensor representation of a matrix group is any representation that is contained in a tensor representation of the general linear group. For example, the orthogonal group O(n) admits a tensor representation on the space of all trace-free symmetric tensors of order two. For orthogonal groups, the tensor representations are contrasted with the spin representations.
