= Polynomial functor =

Endofunctor on the category V of finite-dimensional vector spaces

In algebra, a polynomial functor is an endofunctor on the category $\mathcal{V}$ of finite-dimensional vector spaces that depends polynomially on vector spaces. For example, the symmetric powers $V \mapsto \operatorname{Sym}^n(V)$ and the exterior powers $V \mapsto \wedge^n(V)$ are polynomial functors from $\mathcal{V}$ to $\mathcal{V}$; these two are also Schur functors.

The notion appears in representation theory as well as category theory (the calculus of functors). In particular, the category of homogeneous polynomial functors of degree n is equivalent to the category of finite-dimensional representations of the symmetric group $S_n$ over a field of characteristic zero.

== Definition ==
Let k be a field of characteristic zero and $\mathcal{V}$ the category of finite-dimensional k-vector spaces and k-linear maps. Then an endofunctor $F\colon \mathcal{V} \to \mathcal{V}$ is a polynomial functor if the following equivalent conditions hold:

- For every pair of vector spaces X, Y in $\mathcal{V}$, the map $F\colon \operatorname{Hom}(X, Y) \to \operatorname{Hom}(F(X), F(Y))$ is a polynomial mapping (i.e., a vector-valued polynomial in linear forms).
- Given linear maps $f_i: X \to Y, \, 1 \le i \le r$ in $\mathcal{V}$, the function $(\lambda_1, \dots, \lambda_r) \mapsto F(\lambda_1 f_1 + \cdots + \lambda_r f_r)$ defined on $k^r$ is a polynomial function with coefficients in $\operatorname{Hom}(F(X), F(Y))$.

A polynomial functor is said to be homogeneous of degree n if for any linear maps $f_1, \dots, f_r$ in $\mathcal{V}$ with common domain and codomain, the vector-valued polynomial $F(\lambda_1 f_1 + \cdots + \lambda_r f_r)$ is homogeneous of degree n.

== Variants ==
If “finite vector spaces” is replaced by “finite sets”, one gets the notion of combinatorial species (to be precise, those of polynomial nature).
