= Multi-homogeneous Bézout theorem =

In algebra and algebraic geometry, the multi-homogeneous Bézout theorem is a generalization to multi-homogeneous polynomials of Bézout's theorem, which counts the number of isolated common zeros of a set of homogeneous polynomials. This generalization is due to Igor Shafarevich.

== Motivation ==
Given a polynomial equation or a system of polynomial equations it is often useful to compute or to bound the number of solutions without computing explicitly the solutions.

In the case of a single equation, this problem is solved by the fundamental theorem of algebra, which asserts that the number of complex solutions is bounded by the degree of the polynomial, with equality, if the solutions are counted with their multiplicities.

In the case of a system of n polynomial equations in n unknowns, the problem is solved by Bézout's theorem, which asserts that, if the number of complex solutions is finite, their number is bounded by the product of the degrees of the polynomials. Moreover, if the number of solutions at infinity is also finite, then the product of the degrees equals the number of solutions counted with multiplicities and including the solutions at infinity.

However, it is rather common that the number of solutions at infinity is infinite. In this case, the product of the degrees of the polynomials may be much larger than the number of roots, and better bounds are useful.

Multi-homogeneous Bézout theorem provides such a better bound when the unknowns may be split into several subsets such that the degree of each polynomial in each subset is lower than the total degree of the polynomial. For example, let $p_1, \ldots, p_{2n}$ be polynomials of degree two which are of degree one in n indeterminate $x_1, \ldots x_n,$ and also of degree one in $y_1, \ldots y_n.$ (that is the polynomials are bilinear. In this case, Bézout's theorem bounds the number of solutions by

$$2^{2n},$$

while the multi-homogeneous Bézout theorem gives the bound (using Stirling's approximation)

$$\binom{2n}{n}= \frac{(2n)!}{(n!)^2}\sim \frac{2^{2n}}{\sqrt{\pi n}}.$$

== Statement ==
A multi-homogeneous polynomial is a polynomial that is homogeneous with respect to several sets of variables.

More precisely, consider k positive integers $n_1, \ldots, n_k$, and, for i = 1, ..., k, the $n_i+1$ indeterminates $x_{i,0}, x_{i,1}, \ldots, x_{i,n_i}.$ A polynomial in all these indeterminates is multi-homogeneous of multi-degree $d_1, \ldots, d_k,$ if it is homogeneous of degree $d_i$ in $x_{i,0}, x_{i,1}, \ldots, x_{i,{n_i}}.$

A multi-projective variety is a projective subvariety of the product of projective spaces

$$\mathbb P_{n_1}\times \cdots\times \mathbb P_{n_k},$$

where $\mathbb P_n$ denote the projective space of dimension n. A multi-projective variety may be defined as the set of the common nontrivial zeros of an ideal of multi-homogeneous polynomials, where "nontrivial" means that $x_{i,0}, x_{i,1}, \ldots, x_{i,n}$ are not simultaneously 0, for each i.

Bézout's theorem asserts that n homogeneous polynomials of degree $d_1, \ldots, d_n$ in n + 1 indeterminates define either an algebraic set of positive dimension, or a zero-dimensional algebraic set consisting of $d_1\cdots d_n$ points counted with their multiplicities.

For stating the generalization of Bézout's theorem, it is convenient to introduce new indeterminates $t_1, \ldots, t_k,$ and to represent the multi-degree $d_1, \ldots, d_k$ by the linear form $\mathbf d=d_1t_1+\cdots + d_kt_k.$ In the following, "multi-degree" will refer to this linear form rather than to the sequence of degrees.

Setting $n=n_1+\cdots +n_k,$ the multi-homogeneous Bézout theorem is the following.

With above notation, n multi-homogeneous polynomials of multi-degrees $\mathbf d_1, \ldots, \mathbf d_n$ define either a multi-projective algebraic set of positive dimension, or a zero-dimensional algebraic set consisting of B points, counted with multiplicities, where B is the coefficient of

$$t_1^{n_1}\cdots t_k^{n_k}$$

in the product of linear forms

$$\mathbf d_1 \cdots \mathbf d_n.$$

== Non-homogeneous case ==
The multi-homogeneous Bézout bound on the number of solutions may be used for non-homogeneous systems of equations, when the polynomials may be (multi)-homogenized without increasing the total degree. However, in this case, the bound may be not sharp, if there are solutions "at infinity".

Without insight on the problem that is studied, it may be difficult to group the variables for a "good" multi-homogenization. Fortunately, there are many problems where such a grouping results directly from the problem that is modeled. For example, in mechanics, equations are generally homogeneous or almost homogeneous in the lengths and in the masses.
