= Observable subgroup =

In mathematics, in the representation theory of algebraic groups, an observable subgroup is an algebraic subgroup of a linear algebraic group whose every finite-dimensional rational representation arises as the restriction to the subgroup of a finite-dimensional rational representation of the whole group.

An equivalent formulation, in case the base field is closed, is that K is an observable subgroup of G if and only if the quotient variety G/K is a quasi-affine variety.

Some basic facts about observable subgroups:

- Every normal algebraic subgroup of an algebraic group is observable.
- Every observable subgroup of an observable subgroup is observable.
