= Grosshans subgroup =

In mathematics, in the representation theory of algebraic groups, a Grosshans subgroup, named after Frank Grosshans, is an algebraic subgroup of an algebraic group that is an observable subgroup for which the ring of functions on the quotient variety is finitely generated.
