= Symmetrization =

In mathematics, symmetrization is a process that converts any function in $n$ variables to a symmetric function in $n$ variables. Similarly, antisymmetrization converts any function in $n$ variables into an antisymmetric function.

== Two variables ==
Let $S$ be a set and $A$ be an additive abelian group. A map $\alpha : S \times S \to A$ is called a symmetric map if $\alpha(s,t) = \alpha(t,s) \quad \text{ for all } s, t \in S.$ It is called an antisymmetric map if instead $\alpha(s,t) = - \alpha(t,s) \quad \text{ for all } s, t \in S.$

The symmetrization of a map $\alpha : S \times S \to A$ is the map $(x,y) \mapsto \alpha(x,y) + \alpha(y,x).$ Similarly, the antisymmetrization or skew-symmetrization of a map $\alpha : S \times S \to A$ is the map $(x,y) \mapsto \alpha(x,y) - \alpha(y,x).$

The sum of the symmetrization and the antisymmetrization of a map $\alpha$ is $2 \alpha.$ Thus, away from 2, meaning if 2 is invertible, such as for the real numbers, one can divide by 2 and express every function as a sum of a symmetric function and an anti-symmetric function.

The symmetrization of a symmetric map is its double, while the symmetrization of an alternating map is zero; similarly, the antisymmetrization of a symmetric map is zero, while the antisymmetrization of an anti-symmetric map is its double.

=== Bilinear forms ===
The symmetrization and antisymmetrization of a bilinear map are bilinear; thus away from 2, every bilinear form is a sum of a symmetric form and a skew-symmetric form, and there is no difference between a symmetric form and a quadratic form.

At 2, not every form can be decomposed into a symmetric form and a skew-symmetric form. For instance, over the integers, the associated symmetric form (over the rationals) may take half-integer values, while over $\Z / 2\Z,$ a function is skew-symmetric if and only if it is symmetric (as $1 = - 1$).

This leads to the notion of ε-quadratic forms and ε-symmetric forms.

=== Representation theory ===
In terms of representation theory:

- exchanging variables gives a representation of the symmetric group on the space of functions in two variables,
- the symmetric and antisymmetric functions are the subrepresentations corresponding to the trivial representation and the sign representation, and
- symmetrization and antisymmetrization map a function into these subrepresentations – if one divides by 2, these yield projection maps.

As the symmetric group of order two equals the cyclic group of order two ($\mathrm{S}_2 = \mathrm{C}_2$), this corresponds to the discrete Fourier transform of order two.

== n variables ==
More generally, given a function in $n$ variables, one can symmetrize by taking the sum over all $n!$ permutations of the variables, or antisymmetrize by taking the sum over all $n!/2$ even permutations and subtracting the sum over all $n!/2$ odd permutations (except that when $n \leq 1,$ the only permutation is even).

Here symmetrizing a symmetric function multiplies by $n!$ – thus if $n!$ is invertible, such as when working over a field of characteristic $0$ or $p > n,$ then these yield projections when divided by $n!.$

In terms of representation theory, these only yield the subrepresentations corresponding to the trivial and sign representation, but for $n > 2$ there are others – see representation theory of the symmetric group and symmetric polynomials.

== Bootstrapping ==
Given a function in $k$ variables, one can obtain a symmetric function in $n$ variables by taking the sum over $k$-element subsets of the variables. In statistics, this is referred to as bootstrapping, and the associated statistics are called U-statistics.

== See also ==
- Alternating multilinear map – Multilinear map that is 0 whenever arguments are linearly dependent
- Antisymmetric tensor – Tensor equal to the negative of any of its transpositions
