= Polynomial mapping =

Type of functions in algebra

In algebra, a polynomial map or polynomial mapping $P: V \to W$ between vector spaces over an infinite field k is a polynomial in linear functionals with coefficients in k; i.e., it can be written as
$$P(v) = \sum_{i_1, \dots, i_n} \lambda_{i_1}(v) \cdots \lambda_{i_n}(v) w_{i_1, \dots, i_n}$$
where the $\lambda_{i_j}: V \to k$ are linear functionals and the $w_{i_1, \dots, i_n}$ are vectors in W. For example, if $W = k^m$, then a polynomial mapping can be expressed as $P(v) = (P_1(v), \dots, P_m(v))$ where the $P_i$ are (scalar-valued) polynomial functions on V. (The abstract definition has an advantage that the map is manifestly free of a choice of basis.)

When V, W are finite-dimensional vector spaces and are viewed as algebraic varieties, then a polynomial mapping is precisely a morphism of algebraic varieties.

== See also ==
- Polynomial functor
