= Graded-commutative ring =

Concept in algebra

In algebra, a graded-commutative ring (also called a skew-commutative ring) is a graded ring that is commutative in the graded sense; that is, homogeneous elements x, y satisfy

$$xy = (-1)^{|x||y|} yx,$$

where |x| and |y| denote the degrees of x and y.

A commutative (non-graded) ring, with trivial grading, is a basic example. For a nontrivial example, an exterior algebra is generally not a commutative ring but is a graded-commutative ring.

A cup product on cohomology satisfies the skew-commutative relation; hence, a cohomology ring is graded-commutative. In fact, many examples of graded-commutative rings come from algebraic topology and homological algebra.

== See also ==
- DG algebra
- graded-symmetric algebra
- alternating algebra
- supercommutative algebra
