= Frank Grosshans =

American mathematician

Frank D. Grosshans (born 1942) is an American mathematician who works in invariant theory, where he is known for the discovery of Grosshans subgroups and Grosshans graded coefficients. He is a professor of mathematics at West Chester University, Pennsylvania. Grosshans has been an invited speaker at meetings of the Mathematical Association of America.

He received his B.S. from the University of Illinois and his Ph.D. in mathematics from the University of Chicago. He taught at University of Pennsylvania and Johns Hopkins University before joining the West Chester University.

== Selected books and publications ==
- Goto, Morikuni; Grosshans, Frank D. (1978). Semisimple Lie algebras. New York: M. Dekker. ISBN 0-8247-6744-6.
- Grosshans, Frank D.; Rota, Gian-Carlo; Stein, Joel A. (1987). Invariant theory and superalgebras. Providence, R.I.: Published for the Conference Board of the Mathematical Sciences by the American Mathematical Society. ISBN 0-8218-0719-6.
- Grosshans, Frank D. (1977). Algebraic Homogeneous Spaces and Invariant Theory (Lecture Notes in Mathematics). Springer. ISBN 3-540-63628-5.
- Grosshans, G. D. (1986). "Hilbert's fourteenth problem for non-reductive groups". Mathematische Zeitschrift. 193: 95–144. doi:10.1007/BF01163357. S2CID 120450138.
- Grosshans, F. D. (1987). "Constructing invariant polynomials via tschirnhaus transformations". Invariant Theory. Lecture Notes in Mathematics. Vol. 1278. pp. 95–97. doi:10.1007/BFb0078809. ISBN 978-3-540-18360-0.
- Grosshans, F. D. (1 June 1981). "Rigid Motions of Conics: an Introduction to Invariant Theory". The American Mathematical Monthly. 88 (6). The American Mathematical Monthly, Vol. 88, No. 6: 407–413. doi:10.2307/2321823. ISSN 0002-9890. JSTOR 2321823.
- Gleeson, R., Grosshans, F. D., Hirsch, M. J., Williams, R. M. (2003) "Algorithms for the Recognition of 2D Images of m Points and n Lines in 3D". Image and Vision Computing. 21(6): 497–504. https://doi.org/10.1016/S0262-8856(03)00029-5
