= Alternating algebra =

Algebra with a graded anticommutativity property on multiplication

In mathematics, an alternating algebra is a Z-graded algebra for which xy = (−1)^{deg(x)deg(y)}yx for all nonzero homogeneous elements x and y (i.e. it is an anticommutative algebra) and has the further property that x^{2} = 0 (nilpotence) for every homogeneous element x of odd degree.

== Examples ==
- The differential forms on a differentiable manifold form an alternating algebra.
- The exterior algebra is an alternating algebra.
- The cohomology ring of a topological space is an alternating algebra.

== Properties ==
- The algebra formed as the direct sum of the homogeneous subspaces of even degree of an anticommutative algebra A is a subalgebra contained in the centre of A, and is thus commutative.
- An anticommutative algebra A over a (commutative) base ring R in which 2 is not a zero divisor is alternating.

== See also ==
- Alternating multilinear map
- Exterior algebra
- Graded-symmetric algebra
- Supercommutative algebra
