= Multilinear map =

Vector-valued function of multiple vectors, linear in each argument

In linear algebra, a multilinear map is a function of several variables that is linear separately in each variable. More precisely, a multilinear map is a function

$$f\colon V_1 \times \cdots \times V_n \to W\text{,}$$

where $V_1,\ldots,V_n$ ($n\in\mathbb Z_{\ge0}$) and $W$ are vector spaces (or modules over a commutative ring), with the following property: for each $i$, if all of the variables but $v_i$ are held constant, then $f(v_1, \ldots, v_i, \ldots, v_n)$ is a linear function of $v_i$. One way to visualize this is to imagine two orthogonal vectors; if one of these vectors is scaled by a factor of 2 while the other remains unchanged, the cross product likewise scales by a factor of two. If both are scaled by a factor of 2, the cross product scales by a factor of $2^2$.

A multilinear map of one variable is a linear map, and of two variables is a bilinear map. More generally, for any nonnegative integer $k$, a multilinear map of k variables is called a k-linear map. If the codomain of a multilinear map is the field of scalars, it is called a multilinear form. Multilinear maps and multilinear forms are fundamental objects of study in multilinear algebra.

If all variables belong to the same space, one can consider symmetric, antisymmetric and alternating k-linear maps. The latter two coincide if the underlying ring (or field) has a characteristic different from two, else the former two coincide.

== Examples ==
- Any bilinear map is a multilinear map. For example, any inner product on a $\mathbb R$-vector space is a multilinear map, as is the cross product of vectors in $\mathbb{R}^3$.
- The determinant of a square matrix is a multilinear function of the columns (or rows); it is also an alternating function of the columns (or rows).
- If $F\colon \mathbb{R}^m \to \mathbb{R}^n$ is a C^{k} function, then the $k$th derivative of $F$ at each point $p$ in its domain can be viewed as a symmetric $k$-linear function $D^k\!F\colon \mathbb{R}^m\times\cdots\times\mathbb{R}^m \to \mathbb{R}^n$.

== Coordinate representation ==
Let

$$f\colon V_1 \times \cdots \times V_n \to W\text{,}$$

be a multilinear map between finite-dimensional vector spaces, where $V_i\!$ has dimension $d_i\!$, and $W\!$ has dimension $d\!$. If we choose a basis $\{\textbf{e}_{i1},\ldots,\textbf{e}_{id_i}\}$ for each $V_i\!$ and a basis $\{\textbf{b}_1,\ldots,\textbf{b}_d\}$ for $W\!$ (using bold for vectors), then we can define a collection of scalars $A_{j_1\cdots j_n}^k$ by

$$f(\textbf{e}_{1j_1},\ldots,\textbf{e}_{nj_n}) = A_{j_1\cdots j_n}^1\,\textbf{b}_1 + \cdots +  A_{j_1\cdots j_n}^d\,\textbf{b}_d.$$

Then the scalars $\{A_{j_1\cdots j_n}^k \mid 1\leq j_i\leq d_i, 1 \leq k \leq d\}$ completely determine the multilinear function $f\!$. In particular, if

$$\textbf{v}_i = \sum_{j=1}^{d_i} v_{ij} \textbf{e}_{ij}\!$$

for $1 \leq i \leq n\!$, then

$$f(\textbf{v}_1,\ldots,\textbf{v}_n) = \sum_{j_1=1}^{d_1} \cdots \sum_{j_n=1}^{d_n} \sum_{k=1}^{d} A_{j_1\cdots j_n}^k v_{1j_1}\cdots v_{nj_n} \textbf{b}_k.$$

== Example ==
Let's take a trilinear function

$$g\colon R^2 \times R^2 \times R^2 \to R,$$
where V_{i} = R^{2}, d_{i} = 2, i = 1,2,3, and W = R, d = 1.

A basis for each V_{i} is $\{\textbf{e}_{i1},\ldots,\textbf{e}_{id_i}\} = \{\textbf{e}_{1}, \textbf{e}_{2}\} = \{(1,0), (0,1)\}.$ Let

$$g(\textbf{e}_{1i},\textbf{e}_{2j},\textbf{e}_{3k}) = f(\textbf{e}_{i},\textbf{e}_{j},\textbf{e}_{k}) = A_{ijk},$$
where $i,j,k \in \{1,2\}$. In other words, the constant $A_{i j k}$ is a function value at one of the eight possible triples of basis vectors (since there are two choices for each of the three $V_i$), namely:
$$\{\textbf{e}_1, \textbf{e}_1, \textbf{e}_1\},
\{\textbf{e}_1, \textbf{e}_1, \textbf{e}_2\},
\{\textbf{e}_1, \textbf{e}_2, \textbf{e}_1\},
\{\textbf{e}_1, \textbf{e}_2, \textbf{e}_2\},
\{\textbf{e}_2, \textbf{e}_1, \textbf{e}_1\},
\{\textbf{e}_2, \textbf{e}_1, \textbf{e}_2\},
\{\textbf{e}_2, \textbf{e}_2, \textbf{e}_1\},
\{\textbf{e}_2, \textbf{e}_2, \textbf{e}_2\}.$$

Each vector $\textbf{v}_i \in V_i = R^2$ can be expressed as a linear combination of the basis vectors

$$\textbf{v}_i = \sum_{j=1}^{2} v_{ij} \textbf{e}_{ij} = v_{i1} \times \textbf{e}_1 + v_{i2} \times \textbf{e}_2 = v_{i1} \times (1, 0) + v_{i2} \times (0, 1).$$

The function value at an arbitrary collection of three vectors $\textbf{v}_i \in R^2$ can be expressed as
$$g(\textbf{v}_1,\textbf{v}_2, \textbf{v}_3) = \sum_{i=1}^{2} \sum_{j=1}^{2} \sum_{k=1}^{2} A_{i j k} v_{1i} v_{2j} v_{3k},$$
or in expanded form as
$$\begin{align}
g((a,b),(c,d)&, (e,f)) = ace \times g(\textbf{e}_1, \textbf{e}_1, \textbf{e}_1) + acf \times g(\textbf{e}_1, \textbf{e}_1, \textbf{e}_2) \\
&+ ade \times g(\textbf{e}_1, \textbf{e}_2, \textbf{e}_1) +
adf \times g(\textbf{e}_1, \textbf{e}_2, \textbf{e}_2) +
bce \times g(\textbf{e}_2, \textbf{e}_1, \textbf{e}_1) +
bcf \times g(\textbf{e}_2, \textbf{e}_1, \textbf{e}_2) \\
&+ bde \times g(\textbf{e}_2, \textbf{e}_2, \textbf{e}_1) +
bdf \times g(\textbf{e}_2, \textbf{e}_2, \textbf{e}_2).
\end{align}$$

== Relation to tensor products ==
There is a natural one-to-one correspondence between multilinear maps

$$f\colon V_1 \times \cdots \times V_n \to W\text{,}$$

and linear maps

$$F\colon V_1 \otimes \cdots \otimes V_n \to W\text{,}$$

where $V_1 \otimes \cdots \otimes V_n\!$ denotes the tensor product of $V_1,\ldots,V_n$. The relation between the functions $f$ and $F$ is given by the formula

$$f(v_1,\ldots,v_n)=F(v_1\otimes \cdots \otimes v_n).$$

== Multilinear functions on n×n matrices ==
One can consider multilinear functions, on an n×n matrix over a commutative ring K with identity, as a function of the rows (or equivalently the columns) of the matrix. Let A be such a matrix and a_{i}, 1 ≤ i ≤ n, be the rows of A. Then the multilinear function D can be written as

$$D(A) = D(a_{1},\ldots,a_{n}),$$

satisfying

$$D(a_{1},\ldots,c a_{i} + a_{i}',\ldots,a_{n}) = c D(a_{1},\ldots,a_{i},\ldots,a_{n}) + D(a_{1},\ldots,a_{i}',\ldots,a_{n}).$$

If we let $\hat{e}_j$ represent the jth row of the identity matrix, we can express each row a_{i} as the sum

$$a_{i} = \sum_{j=1}^n A(i,j)\hat{e}_{j}.$$

Using the multilinearity of D we rewrite D(A) as

$$D(A) = D\left(\sum_{j=1}^n A(1,j)\hat{e}_{j}, a_2, \ldots, a_n\right)
= \sum_{j=1}^n A(1,j) D(\hat{e}_{j},a_2,\ldots,a_n).$$

Continuing this substitution for each a_{i} we get, for 1 ≤ i ≤ n,

$$D(A) = \sum_{1\le k_1 \le n} \ldots \sum_{1\le k_i \le n} \ldots \sum_{1\le k_n \le n} A(1,k_{1})A(2,k_{2})\dots A(n,k_{n}) D(\hat{e}_{k_{1}},\dots,\hat{e}_{k_{n}}).$$

Therefore, D(A) is uniquely determined by how D operates on $\hat{e}_{k_{1}},\dots,\hat{e}_{k_{n}}$.

== Example ==
In the case of 2×2 matrices, we get

$$D(A) = A_{1,1}A_{1,2}D(\hat{e}_1,\hat{e}_1) + A_{1,1}A_{2,2}D(\hat{e}_1,\hat{e}_2) + A_{1,2}A_{2,1}D(\hat{e}_2,\hat{e}_1) + A_{1,2}A_{2,2}D(\hat{e}_2,\hat{e}_2), \,$$

where $\hat{e}_1 = [1,0]$ and $\hat{e}_2 = [0,1]$. If we restrict $D$ to be an alternating function, then $D(\hat{e}_1,\hat{e}_1) = D(\hat{e}_2,\hat{e}_2) = 0$ and $D(\hat{e}_2,\hat{e}_1) = -D(\hat{e}_1,\hat{e}_2) = -D(I)$. Letting $D(I) = 1$, we get the determinant function on 2×2 matrices:

$$D(A) = A_{1,1}A_{2,2} - A_{1,2}A_{2,1} .$$

== Properties ==
- A multilinear map has a value of zero whenever one of its arguments is zero.

== See also ==
- Algebraic form
- Multilinear form
- Homogeneous polynomial
- Homogeneous function
- Tensors
