= System of bilinear equations =

In mathematics, a system of bilinear equations is a special sort of system of polynomial equations, where each equation equates a bilinear form with a constant (possibly zero). More precisely, given two sets of variables represented as coordinate vectors x and y, then each equation of the system can be written $y^TA_ix=g_i,$ where, i is an integer whose value ranges from 1 to the number of equations, each $A_i$ is a matrix, and each $g_i$ is a real number. Systems of bilinear equations arise in many subjects including engineering, biology, and statistics.

== See also ==
- Systems of linear equations
