= Graded-symmetric algebra =

Type of algebra over a commutative ring

In algebra, given a commutative ring R, the graded-symmetric algebra of a graded R-module M is the quotient of the tensor algebra of M by the ideal I generated by elements of the form:

- $xy - (-1)^{|x||y|}yx$
- $x^2$ when |x| is odd

for homogeneous elements x, y in M of degree |x|, |y|. By construction, a graded-symmetric algebra is graded-commutative; i.e., $xy = (-1)^{|x||y|} yx$ and is universal for this.

In spite of the name, the notion is a common generalization of a symmetric algebra and an exterior algebra: indeed, if V is a (non-graded) R-module, then the graded-symmetric algebra of V with trivial grading is the usual symmetric algebra of V. Similarly, the graded-symmetric algebra of the graded module with V in degree one and zero elsewhere is the exterior algebra of V.
