= Schur functor =

Certain functors from the category of modules over a fixed commutative ring to itself

In mathematics, especially in the field of representation theory, Schur functors (named after Issai Schur) are certain functors from the category of modules over a fixed commutative ring to itself. They generalize the constructions of exterior powers and symmetric powers of a vector space. Schur functors are indexed by Young diagrams in such a way that the horizontal diagram with n cells corresponds to the nth symmetric power functor, and the vertical diagram with n cells corresponds to the nth exterior power functor. If a vector space V is a representation of a group G, then $\mathbb{S}^{\lambda}V$ also has a natural action of G for any Schur functor $\mathbb{S}^{\lambda}(-)$.

== Definition ==
Schur functors are indexed by partitions and are described as follows. Let R be a commutative ring, E an R-module and λ a partition of a positive integer n. Let T be a Young tableau of shape λ, thus indexing the factors of the n-fold direct product, E × E × ... × E, with the boxes of T. Consider those maps of R-modules $\varphi:E^{\times n} \to M$ satisfying the following conditions

1. $\varphi$ is multilinear,
2. $\varphi$ is alternating in the entries indexed by each column of T,
3. $\varphi$ satisfies an exchange condition stating that if $I \subset \{1,2,\dots,n\}$ are numbers from column i of T then

$$\varphi(x) = \sum_{x'} \varphi(x')$$

where the sum is over n-tuples x′ obtained from x by exchanging the elements indexed by I with any $|I|$ elements indexed by the numbers in column $i-1$ (in order).

The universal R-module $\mathbb{S}^\lambda E$ that extends $\varphi$ to a mapping of R-modules $\tilde{\varphi}:\mathbb{S}^\lambda E \to M$ is the image of E under the Schur functor indexed by λ.

For an example of the condition (3) placed on $\varphi$ suppose that λ is the partition $(2,2,1)$ and the tableau T is numbered such that its entries are 1, 2, 3, 4, 5 when read top-to-bottom (left-to-right). Taking $I = \{4,5\}$ (i.e., the numbers in the second column of T) we have

$$\varphi(x_1,x_2,x_3,x_4,x_5) =
\varphi(x_4,x_5,x_3,x_1,x_2) +
\varphi(x_4,x_2,x_5,x_1,x_3) +
\varphi(x_1,x_4,x_5,x_2,x_3),$$

while if $I = \{5\}$ then

$$\varphi(x_1,x_2,x_3,x_4,x_5) =
\varphi(x_5,x_2,x_3,x_4,x_1) +
\varphi(x_1,x_5,x_3,x_4,x_2) +
\varphi(x_1,x_2,x_5,x_4,x_3).$$

== Examples ==
Fix a vector space V over a field of characteristic zero. We identify partitions and the corresponding Young diagrams. The following descriptions hold:

- For a partition λ = (n) the Schur functor S^{λ}(V) = Sym^{n}(V).
- For a partition λ = (1, ..., 1) (repeated n times) the Schur functor S^{λ}(V) = Λ^{n}(V).
- For a partition λ = (2, 1) the Schur functor S^{λ}(V) is the cokernel of the comultiplication map of exterior powers Λ^{3}(V) → Λ^{2}(V) ⊗ V.
- For a partition λ = (2, 2) the Schur functor S^{λ}(V) is the quotient of Λ^{2}(V) ⊗ Λ^{2}(V) by the images of two maps. One is the composition Λ^{3}(V) ⊗ V → Λ^{2}(V) ⊗ V ⊗ V → Λ^{2}(V) ⊗ Λ^{2}(V), where the first map is the comultiplication along the first coordinate. The other map is a comultiplication Λ^{4}(V) → Λ^{2}(V) ⊗ Λ^{2}(V).
- For a partition λ = (n, 1, ..., 1), with 1 repeated m times, the Schur functor S^{λ}(V) is the quotient of Λ^{n}(V) ⊗ Sym^{m}(V) by the image of the composition of the comultiplication in exterior powers and the multiplication in symmetric powers:
  $$\Lambda^{n+1}(V) \otimes \mathrm{Sym}^{m-1}(V) ~\xrightarrow{\Delta \otimes \mathrm{id}}~ \Lambda^n(V) \otimes V \otimes \mathrm{Sym}^{m-1}(V)
~\xrightarrow{\mathrm{id} \otimes \cdot}~ \Lambda^n(V) \otimes \mathrm{Sym}^m(V)$$

== Applications ==
Let V be a complex vector space of dimension k. It's a tautological representation of its automorphism group GL(V). If λ is a diagram where each row has no more than k cells, then S^{λ}(V) is an irreducible GL(V)-representation of highest weight λ. In fact, any rational representation of GL(V) is isomorphic to a direct sum of representations of the form S^{λ}(V) ⊗ det(V)^{⊗m}, where λ is a Young diagram with each row strictly shorter than k, and m is any (possibly negative) integer.

In this context Schur-Weyl duality states that as a GL(V)-module

$$V^{\otimes n} = \bigoplus_{\lambda \vdash n: \ell(\lambda) \leq k} (\mathbb{S}^{\lambda} V)^{\oplus f^\lambda}$$

where $f^\lambda$ is the number of standard young tableaux of shape λ. More generally, we have the decomposition of the tensor product as $\mathrm{GL}(V) \times \mathfrak{S}_n$-bimodule

$$V^{\otimes n} = \bigoplus_{\lambda \vdash n: \ell(\lambda) \leq k} (\mathbb{S}^{\lambda} V) \otimes \operatorname{Specht}(\lambda)$$

where $\operatorname{Specht}(\lambda)$ is the Specht module indexed by λ. Schur functors can also be used to describe the coordinate ring of certain flag varieties.

== Plethysm ==
For two Young diagrams λ and μ consider the composition of the corresponding Schur functors S^{λ}(S^{μ}(−)). This composition is called a plethysm of λ and μ. From the general theory it is known that, at least for vector spaces over a characteristic zero field, the plethysm is isomorphic to a direct sum of Schur functors. The problem of determining which Young diagrams occur in that description and how to calculate their multiplicities is open, aside from some special cases like Sym^{m}(Sym^{2}(V)).

== See also ==
- Young symmetrizer
- Schur polynomial
- Littlewood–Richardson rule
- Polynomial functor
