= Homogeneous polynomial =

Polynomial whose nonzero terms all have the same degree

In mathematics, a homogeneous polynomial, sometimes called quantic in older texts, is a polynomial whose nonzero terms all have the same degree. For example, $x^5 + 2 x^3 y^2 + 9 x y^4$ is a homogeneous polynomial of degree 5, in two variables; the sum of the exponents in each term is always 5. The polynomial $x^3 + 3 x^2 y + z^7$ is not homogeneous, because the sum of exponents does not match from term to term. The function defined by a homogeneous polynomial is always a homogeneous function.

An algebraic form, or simply form, is a function defined by a homogeneous polynomial. (Note: However, as some authors do not make a clear distinction between a polynomial and its associated function, the terms homogeneous polynomial and form are sometimes considered as synonymous.) A binary form is a form in two variables. A form is also a function defined on a vector space, which may be expressed as a homogeneous function of the coordinates over any basis.

A polynomial of degree 0 is always homogeneous; it is simply an element of the field or ring of the coefficients, usually called a constant or a scalar. A form of degree 1 is a linear form. (Note: Linear forms are defined only for finite-dimensional vector space, and have thus to be distinguished from linear functionals, which are defined for every vector space. "Linear functional" is rarely used for finite-dimensional vector spaces.) A form of degree 2 is a quadratic form. In geometry, the Euclidean distance is the square root of a quadratic form.

Homogeneous polynomials are ubiquitous in mathematics and physics. (Note: Homogeneous polynomials in physics often appear as a consequence of dimensional analysis, where measured quantities must match in real-world problems.) They play a fundamental role in algebraic geometry, as a projective algebraic variety is defined as the set of the common zeros of a set of homogeneous polynomials.

== Properties ==
A homogeneous polynomial defines a homogeneous function. This means that, if a multivariate polynomial P is homogeneous of degree d, then

$$P(\lambda x_1, \ldots, \lambda x_n)=\lambda^d\,P(x_1,\ldots,x_n)\,,$$

for every $\lambda$ in any field containing the coefficients of P. Conversely, if the above relation is true for infinitely many $\lambda$ then the polynomial is homogeneous of degree d.

In particular, if P is homogeneous then

$$P(x_1,\ldots,x_n)=0 \quad\Rightarrow\quad P(\lambda x_1, \ldots, \lambda x_n)=0,$$

for every $\lambda.$ This property is fundamental in the definition of a projective variety.

Any nonzero polynomial may be decomposed, in a unique way, as a sum of homogeneous polynomials of different degrees, which are called the homogeneous components of the polynomial.

Given a polynomial ring $R=K[x_1, \ldots,x_n]$ over a field (or, more generally, a ring) K, the homogeneous polynomials of degree d form a vector space (or a module), commonly denoted $R_d.$ The above unique decomposition means that $R$ is the direct sum of the $R_d$ (sum over all nonnegative integers).

The dimension of the vector space (or free module) $R_d$ is the number of different monomials of degree d in n variables (that is the maximal number of nonzero terms in a homogeneous polynomial of degree d in n variables). It is equal to the binomial coefficient

$$\binom{d+n-1}{n-1}=\binom{d+n-1}{d}=\frac{(d+n-1)!}{d!(n-1)!}.$$

Homogeneous polynomial satisfy Euler's identity for homogeneous functions. That is, if P is a homogeneous polynomial of degree d in the indeterminates $x_1, \ldots, x_n,$ one has, whichever is the commutative ring of the coefficients,

$$dP=\sum_{i=1}^n x_i\frac{\partial P}{\partial x_i},$$

where $\textstyle \frac{\partial P}{\partial x_i}$ denotes the formal partial derivative of P with respect to $x_i.$

== Homogenization ==
A non-homogeneous polynomial P(x_{1},...,x_{n}) can be homogenized by introducing an additional variable x_{0} and defining the homogeneous polynomial sometimes denoted ^{h}P:

$${^h\!P}(x_0,x_1,\dots, x_n) = x_0^d P \left (\frac{x_1}{x_0},\dots, \frac{x_n}{x_0} \right ),$$

where d is the degree of P. For example, if

$$P(x_1,x_2,x_3)=x_3^3 + x_1 x_2+7,$$

then

$$^h\!P(x_0,x_1,x_2,x_3)=x_3^3 + x_0 x_1x_2 + 7 x_0^3.$$

A homogenized polynomial can be dehomogenized by setting the additional variable x_{0} = 1. That is

$$P(x_1,\dots, x_n)={^h\!P}(1,x_1,\dots, x_n).$$

== See also ==
- Multi-homogeneous polynomial
- Quasi-homogeneous polynomial
- Diagonal form
- Graded algebra
- Hilbert series and Hilbert polynomial
- Multilinear form
- Multilinear map
- Polarization of an algebraic form
- Schur polynomial
- Symbol of a differential operator
