= Rational representation =

In mathematics, in the representation theory of algebraic groups, a linear representation of an algebraic group is said to be rational if, viewed as a map from the group to the general linear group, it is a rational map of algebraic varieties.

Finite direct sums and products of rational representations are rational.

A rational $G$ module is a module that can be expressed as a sum (not necessarily direct) of rational representations.

== See also ==
- Schur functor, used in the classification of irreducible rational representations of the general linear group
