= Bilinear form =

Scalar-valued bilinear function

In mathematics, a bilinear form is a bilinear map V × V → K on a vector space V (the elements of which are called vectors) over a field K (the elements of which are called scalars). In other words, a bilinear form is a function B : V × V → K that is linear in each argument separately:

- B(u + v, w) = B(u, w) + B(v, w) and B(λu, v) = λB(u, v)
- B(u, v + w) = B(u, v) + B(u, w) and B(u, λv) = λB(u, v)

The dot product on $\R^n$ is an example of a bilinear form which is also an inner product. An example of a bilinear form that is not an inner product would be the four-vector product.

The definition of a bilinear form can be extended to include modules over a ring, with linear maps replaced by module homomorphisms.

When K is the field of complex numbers C, one is often more interested in sesquilinear forms, which are similar to bilinear forms but are conjugate linear in one argument.

== Coordinate representation ==
Let V be an n-dimensional vector space with basis {e_{1}, …, e_{n}}.

The n × n matrix A, defined by A_{ij} = B(e_{i}, e_{j}) is called the matrix of the bilinear form on the basis {e_{1}, …, e_{n}}.

If the n × 1 matrix x represents a vector x with respect to this basis, and similarly, the n × 1 matrix y represents another vector y, then:
$$B(\mathbf{x}, \mathbf{y}) = \mathbf{x}^\textsf{T} A\mathbf{y} = \sum_{i,j=1}^n x_i A_{ij} y_j.$$

A bilinear form has different matrices on different bases. However, the matrices of a bilinear form on different bases are all congruent. More precisely, if {f_{1}, …, f_{n}} is another basis of V, then
$$\mathbf{f}_j=\sum_{i=1}^n \mathbf{e}_iS_{ij},$$
where the $S_{ij}$ form an invertible matrix S. Then, the matrix of the bilinear form on the new basis is S^{T}AS.

In an orthonormal basis, the Euclidean dot product is represented by the n × n identity matrix.

== Properties ==
=== Non-degenerate bilinear forms ===
Every bilinear form B on V defines a pair of linear maps from V to its dual space V^{∗}. Define B_{1}, B_{2}: V → V^{∗} by

B_{1}(v)(w) = B(v, w)
B_{2}(v)(w) = B(w, v)

This is often denoted as

B_{1}(v) = B(v, ⋅)
B_{2}(v) = B(⋅, v)

where the dot ( ⋅ ) indicates the slot into which the argument for the resulting linear functional is to be placed (see Currying).

For a finite-dimensional vector space V, if either of B_{1} or B_{2} is an isomorphism, then both are, and the bilinear form B is said to be nondegenerate. More concretely, for a finite-dimensional vector space, non-degenerate means that every non-zero element pairs non-trivially with some other element:

$B(x,y)=0$ for all $y \in V$ implies that x = 0 and
$B(x,y)=0$ for all $x \in V$ implies that y = 0.

The corresponding notion for a module over a commutative ring is that a bilinear form is unimodular if V → V^{∗} is an isomorphism. Given a finitely generated module over a commutative ring, the pairing may be injective (hence "nondegenerate" in the above sense) but not unimodular. For example, over the integers, the pairing B(x, y) = 2xy is nondegenerate but not unimodular, as the induced map from V = Z to V^{∗} = Z is multiplication by 2.

If V is finite-dimensional then one can identify V with its double dual V^{∗∗}. One can then show that B_{2} is the transpose of the linear map B_{1} (if V is infinite-dimensional then B_{2} is the transpose of B_{1} restricted to the image of V in V^{∗∗}). Given B one can define the transpose of B to be the bilinear form given by

^{t}B(v, w) = B(w, v).

The left radical and right radical of the form B are the kernels of B_{1} and B_{2} respectively; they are the vectors orthogonal to the whole space on the left and on the right.

If V is finite-dimensional then the rank of B_{1} is equal to the rank of B_{2}. If this number is equal to dim(V) then B_{1} and B_{2} are linear isomorphisms from V to V^{∗}. In this case B is nondegenerate. By the rank–nullity theorem, this is equivalent to the condition that the left and equivalently right radicals be trivial. For finite-dimensional spaces, this is often taken as the definition of nondegeneracy:

Definition: B is nondegenerate if B(v, w) = 0 for all w implies v = 0.

Given any linear map A : V → V^{∗} one can obtain a bilinear form B on V via

B(v, w) = A(v)(w).

This form will be nondegenerate if and only if A is an isomorphism.

If V is finite-dimensional then, relative to some basis for V, a bilinear form is degenerate if and only if the determinant of the associated matrix is zero. Likewise, a nondegenerate form is one for which the determinant of the associated matrix is non-zero (the matrix is non-singular). These statements are independent of the chosen basis. For a module over a commutative ring, a unimodular form is one for which the determinant of the associate matrix is a unit (for example 1), hence the term; note that a form whose matrix determinant is non-zero but not a unit will be nondegenerate but not unimodular, for example B(x, y) = 2xy over the integers.

=== Symmetric, skew-symmetric, and alternating forms ===
We define a bilinear form to be

- symmetric if B(v, w) = B(w, v) for all v, w in V;
- alternating if B(v, v) = 0 for all v in V;
- skew-symmetric or antisymmetric if B(v, w) = −B(w, v) for all v, w in V;
  Proposition
  Every alternating form is skew-symmetric.
  Proof
  This can be seen by expanding B(v + w, v + w).

If the characteristic of K is not 2 then the converse is also true: every skew-symmetric form is alternating. However, if char(K) = 2 then a skew-symmetric form is the same as a symmetric form and there exist symmetric/skew-symmetric forms that are not alternating.

A bilinear form is symmetric (respectively skew-symmetric) if and only if its coordinate matrix (relative to any basis) is symmetric (respectively skew-symmetric). A bilinear form is alternating if and only if its coordinate matrix is skew-symmetric and the diagonal entries are all zero (which follows from skew-symmetry when char(K) ≠ 2).

A bilinear form is symmetric if and only if the maps B_{1}, B_{2}: V → V^{∗} are equal, and skew-symmetric if and only if they are negatives of one another. If char(K) ≠ 2 then one can decompose a bilinear form into a symmetric and a skew-symmetric part as follows
$$B^{+} = \tfrac{1}{2} (B + {}^{\text{t}}B)  \qquad  B^{-} = \tfrac{1}{2} (B - {}^{\text{t}}B) ,$$
where ^{t}B is the transpose of B (defined above).

=== Reflexive bilinear forms and orthogonal vectors ===
Definition: A bilinear form B : V × V → K is called reflexive if B(v, w) = 0 implies B(w, v) = 0 for all v, w in V.
Definition: Let B : V × V → K be a reflexive bilinear form. v, w in V are orthogonal with respect to B if B(v, w) = 0.

A bilinear form B is reflexive if and only if it is either symmetric or alternating. In the absence of reflexivity we have to distinguish left and right orthogonality. In a reflexive space the left and right radicals agree and are termed the kernel or the radical of the bilinear form: the subspace of all vectors orthogonal with every other vector. A vector v, with matrix representation x, is in the radical of a bilinear form with matrix representation A, if and only if Ax = 0 ⇔ x^{T}A = 0. The radical is always a subspace of V. It is trivial if and only if the matrix A is nonsingular, and thus if and only if the bilinear form is nondegenerate.

Suppose W is a subspace. Define the orthogonal complement
$$W^{\perp} = \left\{\mathbf{v} \mid B(\mathbf{v}, \mathbf{w}) = 0 \text{ for all } \mathbf{w} \in W\right\} .$$

For a non-degenerate form on a finite-dimensional space, the map V/W → W^{⊥} is bijective, and the dimension of W^{⊥} is dim(V) − dim(W).

=== Bounded and elliptic bilinear forms ===
Definition: A bilinear form on a normed vector space (V, ‖⋅‖) is bounded, if there is a constant C such that for all u, v ∈ V,
$$B ( \mathbf{u} , \mathbf{v}) \le C \left\| \mathbf{u} \right\| \left\|\mathbf{v} \right\| .$$

Definition: A bilinear form on a normed vector space (V, ‖⋅‖) is elliptic, or coercive, if there is a constant c > 0 such that for all u ∈ V,
$$B ( \mathbf{u} , \mathbf{u}) \ge c \left\| \mathbf{u} \right\| ^2 .$$

== Associated quadratic form ==
For any bilinear form B : V × V → K, there exists an associated quadratic form Q : V → K defined by Q : V → K : v ↦ B(v, v).

When char(K) ≠ 2, the quadratic form Q is determined by the symmetric part of the bilinear form B and is independent of the antisymmetric part. In this case there is a one-to-one correspondence between the symmetric part of the bilinear form and the quadratic form, and it makes sense to speak of the symmetric bilinear form associated with a quadratic form.

When char(K) = 2 and dim V > 1, this correspondence between quadratic forms and symmetric bilinear forms breaks down.

== Relation to tensor products ==
By the universal property of the tensor product, there is a canonical correspondence between bilinear forms on V and linear maps V ⊗ V → K. If B is a bilinear form on V the corresponding linear map is given by

v ⊗ w ↦ B(v, w)

In the other direction, if F : V ⊗ V → K is a linear map the corresponding bilinear form is given by composing F with the bilinear map V × V → V ⊗ V that sends (v, w) to v⊗w.

The set of all linear maps V ⊗ V → K is the dual space of V ⊗ V, so bilinear forms may be thought of as elements of (V ⊗ V)^{∗} which (when V is finite-dimensional) is canonically isomorphic to V^{∗} ⊗ V^{∗}.

Likewise, symmetric bilinear forms may be thought of as elements of (Sym^{2}V)^{*} (dual of the second symmetric power of V) and alternating bilinear forms as elements of (Λ^{2}V)^{∗} ≃ Λ^{2}V^{∗} (the second exterior power of V^{∗}). If char(K) ≠ 2, (Sym^{2}V)^{*} ≃ Sym^{2}(V^{∗}).

== Generalizations ==
=== Pairs of distinct vector spaces ===
Much of the theory is available for a bilinear mapping from two vector spaces over the same base field to that field

B : V × W → K.

Here we still have induced linear mappings from V to W^{∗}, and from W to V^{∗}. It may happen that these mappings are isomorphisms; assuming finite dimensions, if one is an isomorphism, the other must be. When this occurs, B is said to be a perfect pairing.

In finite dimensions, this is equivalent to the pairing being nondegenerate (the spaces necessarily having the same dimensions). For modules (instead of vector spaces), just as how a nondegenerate form is weaker than a unimodular form, a nondegenerate pairing is a weaker notion than a perfect pairing. A pairing can be nondegenerate without being a perfect pairing, for instance Z × Z → Z via (x, y) ↦ 2xy is nondegenerate, but induces multiplication by 2 on the map Z → Z^{∗}.

Terminology varies in coverage of bilinear forms. For example, F. Reese Harvey discusses "eight types of inner product". To define them he uses diagonal matrices A_{ij} having only +1 or −1 for non-zero elements. Some of the "inner products" are symplectic forms and some are sesquilinear forms or Hermitian forms. Rather than a general field K, the instances with real numbers R, complex numbers C, and quaternions H are spelled out. The bilinear form
$$\sum_{k=1}^p x_k y_k - \sum_{k=p+1}^n  x_k y_k$$
is called the real symmetric case and labeled R(p, q), where p + q = n. Then he articulates the connection to traditional terminology:

Some of the real symmetric cases are very important. The positive definite case R(n, 0) is called Euclidean space, while the case of a single minus, R(n−1, 1) is called Lorentzian space. If n = 4, then Lorentzian space is also called Minkowski space or Minkowski spacetime. The special case R(p, p) will be referred to as the split-case.

=== General modules ===
Given a ring R and a right R-module M and its dual module M^{∗}, a mapping B : M^{∗} × M → R is called a bilinear form if

B(u + v, x) = B(u, x) + B(v, x)
B(u, x + y) = B(u, x) + B(u, y)
B(αu, xβ) = αB(u, x)β

for all u, v ∈ M^{∗}, all x, y ∈ M and all α, β ∈ R.

The mapping ⟨⋅,⋅⟩ : M^{∗} × M → R : (u, x) ↦ u(x) is known as the natural pairing, also called the canonical bilinear form on M^{∗} × M.

A linear map S : M^{∗} → M^{∗} : u ↦ S(u) induces the bilinear form B : M^{∗} × M → R : (u, x) ↦ ⟨S(u), x⟩, and a linear map T : M → M : x ↦ T(x) induces the bilinear form B : M^{∗} × M → R : (u, x) ↦ ⟨u, T(x)⟩.

Conversely, a bilinear form B : M^{∗} × M → R induces the R-linear maps S : M^{∗} → M^{∗} : u ↦ (x ↦ B(u, x)) and T′ : M → M^{∗∗} : x ↦ (u ↦ B(u, x)). Here, M^{∗∗} denotes the double dual of M.

== See also ==
- Bilinear map
- Category:Bilinear maps
- Inner product space
- Linear form
- Multilinear form
- Polar space
- Quadratic form
- Sesquilinear form
- System of bilinear equations
- Metric tensor
- Wall's theorem on automorphisms
