= Symmetric power =

Mathematic concept

In mathematics, the n-th symmetric power of an object X is the quotient of the n-fold product $X^n:=X \times \cdots \times X$ by the permutation action of the symmetric group $\mathfrak{S}_n$.

More precisely, the notion exists at least in the following three areas:

- In linear algebra, the n-th symmetric power of a vector space V is the vector subspace of the symmetric algebra of V consisting of degree-n elements (here the product is a tensor product).
- In algebraic topology, the n-th symmetric power of a topological space X is the quotient space $X^n/\mathfrak{S}_n$, as in the beginning of this article.
- In algebraic geometry, a symmetric power is defined in a way similar to that in algebraic topology. For example, if $X = \operatorname{Spec}(A)$ is an affine variety, then the GIT quotient $\operatorname{Spec}((A \otimes_k \dots \otimes_k A)^{\mathfrak{S}_n})$ is the n-th symmetric power of X.
