= Bilinear map =

Function of two vectors linear in each argument

In mathematics, a bilinear map is a function combining elements of two vector spaces to yield an element of a third vector space, and is linear in each of its arguments. Matrix multiplication is an example.

A bilinear map can also be defined for modules. For that, see the article pairing.

== Definition ==
=== Vector spaces ===
Let $V, W$ and $X$ be three vector spaces over the same base field $F$. A bilinear map is a function
$$B : V \times W \to X$$
such that for all $w \in W$, the map $B_w$
$$v \mapsto B(v, w)$$
is a linear map from $V$ to $X,$ and for all $v \in V$, the map $B_v$
$$w \mapsto B(v, w)$$
is a linear map from $W$ to $X.$ In other words, when we hold the second entry of the bilinear map fixed while letting the first entry vary, yielding $B_w$, the result is a linear operator, and similarly for when we hold the first entry fixed.

Such a map $B$ satisfies the following properties.

- For any $\lambda \in F$, $B(\lambda v,w) = B(v, \lambda w) = \lambda B(v, w).$
- The map $B$ is additive in both components: if $v_1, v_2 \in V$ and $w_1, w_2 \in W,$ then $B(v_1 + v_2, w) = B(v_1, w) + B(v_2, w)$ and $B(v, w_1 + w_2) = B(v, w_1) + B(v, w_2).$

If $V = W$ and we have B(v, w) = B(w, v) for all $v, w \in V,$ then we say that B is symmetric. If X is the base field F, then the map is called a bilinear form, which are well-studied (for example: scalar product, inner product, and quadratic form).

=== Modules ===
The definition works without any changes if instead of vector spaces over a field F, we use modules over a commutative ring R. It generalizes to n-ary functions, where the proper term is multilinear.

For non-commutative rings R and S, a left R-module M and a right S-module N, a bilinear map is a map B : M × N → T with T an (R, S)-bimodule, and for which any n in N, m ↦ B(m, n) is an R-module homomorphism, and for any m in M, n ↦ B(m, n) is an S-module homomorphism. This satisfies

B(r ⋅ m, n) = r ⋅ B(m, n)
B(m, n ⋅ s) = B(m, n) ⋅ s

for all m in M, n in N, r in R and s in S, as well as B being additive in each argument.

== Properties ==
An immediate consequence of the definition is that B(v, w) = 0_{X} whenever v = 0_{V} or w = 0_{W}. This may be seen by writing the zero vector 0_{V} as 0 ⋅ 0_{V} (and similarly for 0_{W}) and moving the scalar 0 "outside", in front of B, by bilinearity.

The set L(V, W; X) of all bilinear maps is a linear subspace of the space (viz. vector space, module) of all maps from V × W into X.

If V, W, X are finite-dimensional, then so is L(V, W; X). For $X = F,$ that is, bilinear forms, the dimension of this space is dim V × dim W (while the space L(V × W; F) of linear forms is of dimension dim V + dim W). To see this, choose a basis for V and W; then each bilinear map can be uniquely represented by the matrix B(e_{i}, f_{j}), and vice versa. Now, if X is a space of higher dimension, we obviously have dim L(V, W; X) = dim V × dim W × dim X.

== Examples ==
- Matrix multiplication is a bilinear map M(m, n) × M(n, p) → M(m, p).
- If a vector space V over the real numbers $\R$ carries an inner product, then the inner product is a bilinear map $V \times V \to \R.$
- In general, for a vector space V over a field F, a bilinear form on V is the same as a bilinear map V × V → F.
- If V is a vector space with dual space V^{∗}, then the canonical evaluation map, b(f, v) = f(v) is a bilinear map from V^{∗} × V to the base field.
- Let V and W be vector spaces over the same base field F. If f is a member of V^{∗} and g a member of W^{∗}, then b(v, w) = f(v)g(w) defines a bilinear map V × W → F.
- The cross product in $\R^3$ is a bilinear map $\R^3 \times \R^3 \to \R^3.$
- Let $B : V \times W \to X$ be a bilinear map, and $L : U \to W$ be a linear map, then (v, u) ↦ B(v, Lu) is a bilinear map on V × U.

== Continuity and separate continuity ==
Suppose $X, Y,$ and $Z$ are topological vector spaces and let $b : X \times Y \to Z$ be a bilinear map. Then b is said to be separately continuous if the following two conditions hold:

1. for all $x \in X,$ the map $Y \to Z$ given by $y \mapsto b(x, y)$ is continuous;
2. for all $y \in Y,$ the map $X \to Z$ given by $x \mapsto b(x, y)$ is continuous.

Many separately continuous bilinear that are not continuous satisfy an additional property: hypocontinuity. All continuous bilinear maps are hypocontinuous.

=== Sufficient conditions for continuity ===
Many bilinear maps that occur in practice are separately continuous but not all are continuous. We list here sufficient conditions for a separately continuous bilinear map to be continuous.

- If X is a Baire space and Y is metrizable then every separately continuous bilinear map $b : X \times Y \to Z$ is continuous.
- If $X, Y, \text{ and } Z$ are the strong duals of Fréchet spaces then every separately continuous bilinear map $b : X \times Y \to Z$ is continuous.
- If a bilinear map is continuous at (0, 0) then it is continuous everywhere.

=== Composition map ===
Let $X, Y, \text{ and } Z$ be locally convex Hausdorff spaces and let $C : L(X; Y) \times L(Y; Z) \to L(X; Z)$ be the composition map defined by $C(u, v) := v \circ u.$ In general, the bilinear map $C$ is not continuous (no matter what topologies the spaces of linear maps are given). We do, however, have the following results:

Give all three spaces of linear maps one of the following topologies:

1. give all three the topology of bounded convergence;
2. give all three the topology of compact convergence;
3. give all three the topology of pointwise convergence.
- If $E$ is an equicontinuous subset of $L(Y; Z)$ then the restriction $C\big\vert_{L(X; Y) \times E} : L(X; Y) \times E \to L(X; Z)$ is continuous for all three topologies.
- If $Y$ is a barreled space then for every sequence $\left(u_i\right)_{i=1}^{\infty}$ converging to $u$ in $L(X; Y)$ and every sequence $\left(v_i\right)_{i=1}^{\infty}$ converging to $v$ in $L(Y; Z),$ the sequence $\left(v_i \circ u_i\right)_{i=1}^{\infty}$ converges to $v \circ u$ in $L(Y; Z).$

== See also ==
- Tensor product – Mathematical operation on vector spaces
- Sesquilinear form – Generalization of complex inner products
- Bilinear filtering – Method of interpolating functions on a 2D grid
- Multilinear map – Vector-valued function of multiple vectors, linear in each argument

== Bibliography ==
- Schaefer, Helmut H.; Wolff, Manfred P. (1999). Topological Vector Spaces. GTM. Vol. 8 (Second ed.). New York, NY: Springer New York Imprint Springer. ISBN 978-1-4612-7155-0. OCLC 840278135.
- Trèves, François (2006) [1967]. Topological Vector Spaces, Distributions and Kernels. Mineola, N.Y.: Dover Publications. ISBN 978-0-486-45352-1. OCLC 853623322.
